= Brazeau =

Brazeau may refer to:

== Places ==
=== Canada ===
- Brazeau, an obsolete alternative name for Nordegg, a hamlet in Alberta
- Brazeau County, a municipal district in Alberta
- Brazeau River, a river in Alberta
- Brazeau Reservoir, a man-made lake in Alberta
- Mount Brazeau, a mountain in the Canadian Rockies of Alberta

=== United States ===
- Brazeau, Wisconsin, a town in Oconto County, Wisconsin, United States
- Brazeau, Missouri, an unincorporated community in southeastern Perry County, Missouri, United States
- Brazeau Township, Perry County, Missouri, a township in Perry County, Missouri
- Brazeau Bottom, an alluvial floodplain in Perry County, Missouri
- Brazeau Creek, a stream in Perry County, Missouri

== Geography ==
- Brazeau Bottom, an alluvial floodplain in Perry County, Missouri
- Brazeau Creek, a stream in Perry County, Missouri

== People ==
- Alexander Brazeau, American politician
- Jim Brazeau (born 1968), American soccer goalkeeper
- Justin Brazeau (born 1998), Canadian ice hockey player
- Patrick Brazeau (born 1974), Canadian aboriginal activist and senator
- Theodore W. Brazeau (1873–1965), American politician
