= Seelitz, Missouri =

Seelitz, Perry County, Missouri
- Abandoned village
- Location of Perry County, Missouri
- Country: United States
- State: Missouri
- County: Perry
- Township: Brazeau
- Time zone: UTC-6 (Central (CST))
  - Summer (DST): UTC-5 (CDT)

Seelitz is an abandoned village in Brazeau Township in Perry County, Missouri, United States. It was an early German Lutheran settlement in Missouri.

== Etymology ==
Seelitz was named after Seelitz in Saxony, Germany.

== History ==
Seelitz was a short-lived town near Altenburg, one of the seven colonies established in 1839 in the Saxon Migration. Pastor Ernst Moritz Bürger was the Lutheran pastor of the village. Seelitz was settled by people from Bürger's congregation in Germany and from that of his father. Although only one of the colonists is recorded as coming from the small parish of Seelitz, which is near Rochlitz in the Zwickauer Mulde valley, Bürger may have chosen it out of filial piety and the memory of his own first pastorate, rather than Lunzenau, from which he and most of his people had actually come. Seeltiz remained small and never received a post office.

== Location ==
Seelitz must have been near to, and somewhere to the north of, Frohna, in the Brazeau Creek bottom, because the "special partition" between those two colonies had not yet been agreed upon in November 1839. Seelitz' low-lying situation made it unhealthy and subject to various fevers. By 1841, Bürger's congregation had been reduced to five, and after much dissatisfaction he resigned, and the parish was made a branch of Altenburg. Thereafter the name disappears from the map. It has been impossible to ascertain whether its territory was united with that of Altenburg, or Frohna, or perchance changed its name to Brazeau, a small community which still survives a short distance away on Brazeau Creek, and which is said to have been originally settled by the Saxons in 1839.

Another possible location is provided by an 1870s map of neighboring Illinois counties, it locates Seelitz northeast of Altenburg and northwest of Wittenberg along the southern bank of the Brazeau Creek.
