= Dresden, Perry County, Missouri =

- Abandoned village
- Location of Perry County, Missouri
- Coordinates: 37°38′N 89°35′W
- Country: United States
- State: Missouri
- County: Perry
- Township: Brazeau
- Time zone: UTC-6 (Central (CST))
  - Summer (DST): UTC-5 (CDT)

Dresden is an abandoned village in Brazeau Township in Perry County, Missouri, United States. It was an early German Lutheran settlement in Missouri.

== Etymology ==
Dresden was named after Dresden in Saxony, Germany, the city where Pastor Martin Stephan's church was located and where his movement had originated.

== History ==
Dresden was a short-lived town near Altenburg, one of the seven colonies established in 1839 in the Saxon Migration. Pastor Carl Frederick Wilhelm Walter ministered to the village of Dresden. It was one of the prominenet settlements originally but was last denoted on a map in the 1870s. Dresden remained small and never received a post office.

=== Log-cabin seminary ===
A log-cabin Lutheran seminary “college” was founded in 1839 at Dresden by J. F. Bürger, T. Brohm, O. Fuerbringer, and Walther; classes, however, soon moved to Altenburg. Most of Dresden's inhabitants came from Dresden, Germany. After Stephan's downfall, it was assigned for a time to the care of Walther, but most of the other pastors also lived there because it contained most of the habitable dwellings of the first Saxon settlers. It must have immediately adjoined Altenburg, probably on the south, because the "special partition" between them for a while was unfixed, and in 1841, when Walther left to take over his brother's church in St. Louis, it was made a subsidiary parish or branch of Altenburg. This probably marked its end as an independent settlement. The log cabin erected for the college in 1839 is originally said to have been located within the territory of Dresden, but subsequently has always been spoken of as Altenburg, where it is exhibited today.

== Geography ==
Dresden was located in southeastern Perry County, a few miles southwest of Wittenburg west of the Mississippi River. Altenburg and Grand Tower flanked Dresden to the west and southeast, respectively.
