= Wittenberg, Missouri =

Unincorporated community in Missouri, U.S.

Coordinates: 37°39′09″N 89°31′28″W

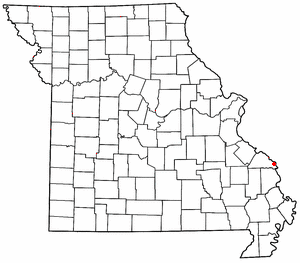

Wittenberg is an unincorporated community in Brazeau Township in eastern Perry County, Missouri, United States. It is located on the Mississippi River, 14 miles (23 km) southeast of Perryville. Wittenberg is situated in the Brazeau Bottoms on Brazeau Creek opposite Grand Tower, Illinois, and Tower Rock, the latter a landmark island in the Mississippi River.

== History ==
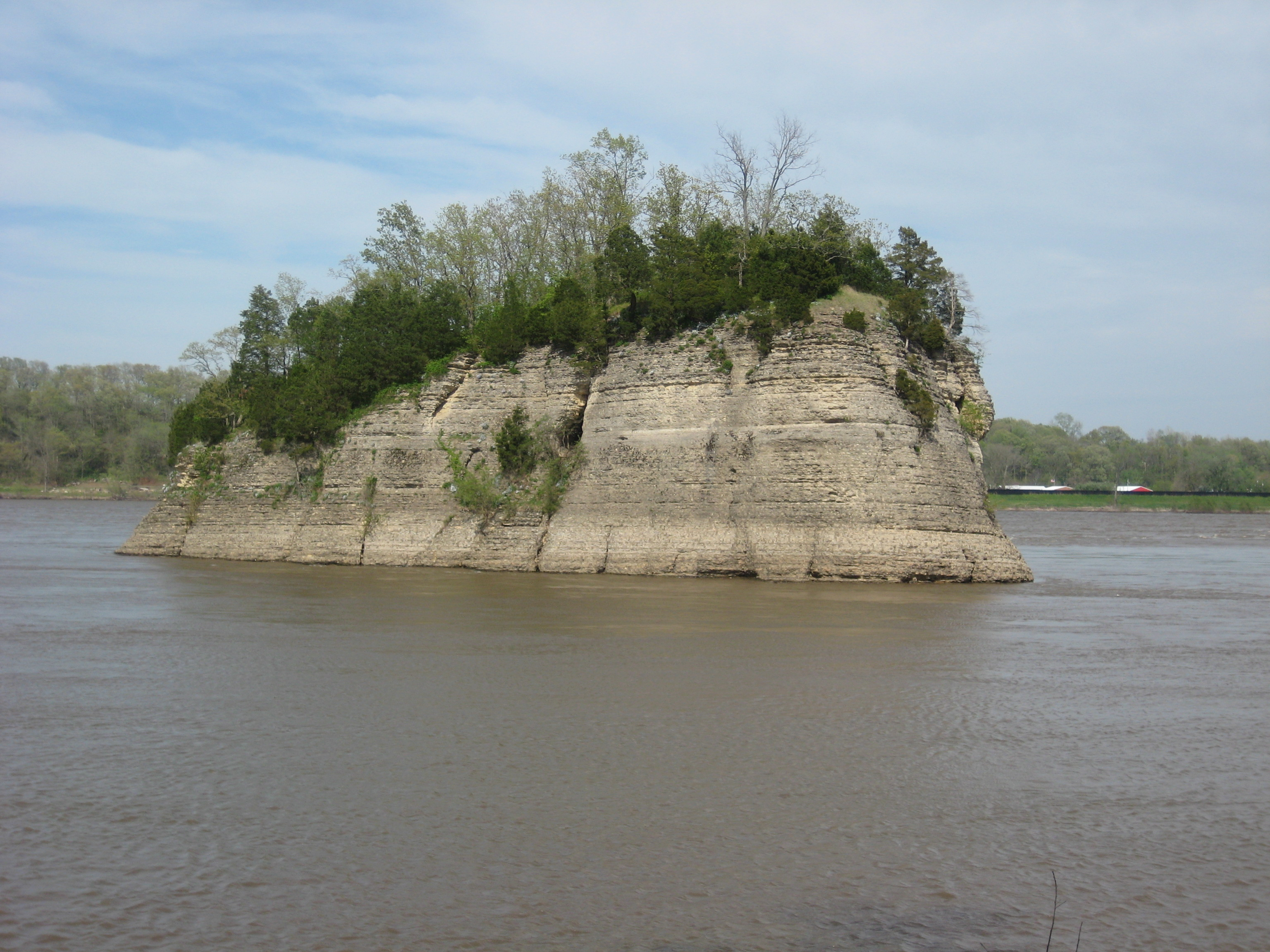
Tower Rock, near Wittenberg.

Wittenberg is one of seven towns and villages in the area founded by German Lutheran immigrants in 1839. Wittenberg and the others—Altenburg, Dresden, Frohna, Johannisberg, Paitzdorf, and Seelitz—were all named by settlers for towns in the Saxony region of their native country. The city's namesake, Wittenberg, Germany, is important in Lutheran history as the place where Martin Luther posted the Ninety-five Theses, which sparked the Reformation.

Historical population
| Census | Pop. | Note | %± |
|---|---|---|---|
| 1900 | 114 | | — |
| 1910 | 87 | | −23.7% |
| 1920 | 269 | | 209.2% |
| 1930 | 95 | | −64.7% |
| 1940 | 84 | | −11.6% |
| 1950 | 54 | | −35.7% |
| 1960 | 30 | | −44.4% |
| 1970 | 9 | | −70.0% |
| 1980 | 4 | | −55.6% |
U.S. Decennial Census

The immigrant group would eventually form the backbone of the Lutheran Church–Missouri Synod, and they considered Tower Rock, nearby in the Mississippi River, to be their own version of Plymouth Rock in their search for religious freedom. At its high point, Wittenberg had as many as 400 residents. In addition to St. Paul's Lutheran church and one-room school, the town supported a brewery, a furniture factory, two grocery stores, a tavern, a flour mill, a cooperage, and two hotels.

Among Wittenberg's claims to fame is the last train robbery in Missouri. In November, 1922, a train bound for San Francisco, California, from St. Louis was robbed approximately two miles (3.2 km) north of Wittenberg. Over $100,000 was taken by Jack "Quail Hunter" Kennedy, a notorious train robber and last active member of the Jesse James gang. Unfortunately for the robbers, one of Kennedy's two accomplices was secretly working undercover for the railroad police. When Kennedy and the other robber showed up to board their getaway autos, they were met by a host of law officers including two deputy sheriffs, three railroad special agents, and six postal inspectors. Not heeding demands to surrender, Kennedy reached for his weapon, and both robbers were shot dead.

Floods in 1927 and 1973 caused severe damage to the town, destroying most of the businesses. The school closed in 1969. In 1980, the few remaining residents of Wittenberg took on the U.S Census Bureau. The official government tally was four, but the village members were able to prove that in fact the population was double that, with eight residents. Finally, in 1983, with the population now only five people, residents petitioned a Perry County judge to disincorporate the town, with the motion being granted. The Great Mississippi and Missouri Rivers Flood of 1993 destroyed what little was left of the community. Today only a few house foundations, steps, and the paved riverfront boat dock remain. In 1994, the Lutheran Historical Society of Perry County erected a large marker on the site where the Wittenberg Lutheran Church once stood.

== Geography ==
Wittenberg lies at the southern end of Brazeau Bottom along the Mississippi River. To its west lie the Mississippi River bluffs, and to the east lie Tower Rock, Grand Tower Island, and Grand Tower, Illinois. Brazeau Creek empties into the Mississippi River at Wittenberg. The Grand Tower Pipeline Bridge crosses the Mississippi River at Wittenberg.

== Gallery ==
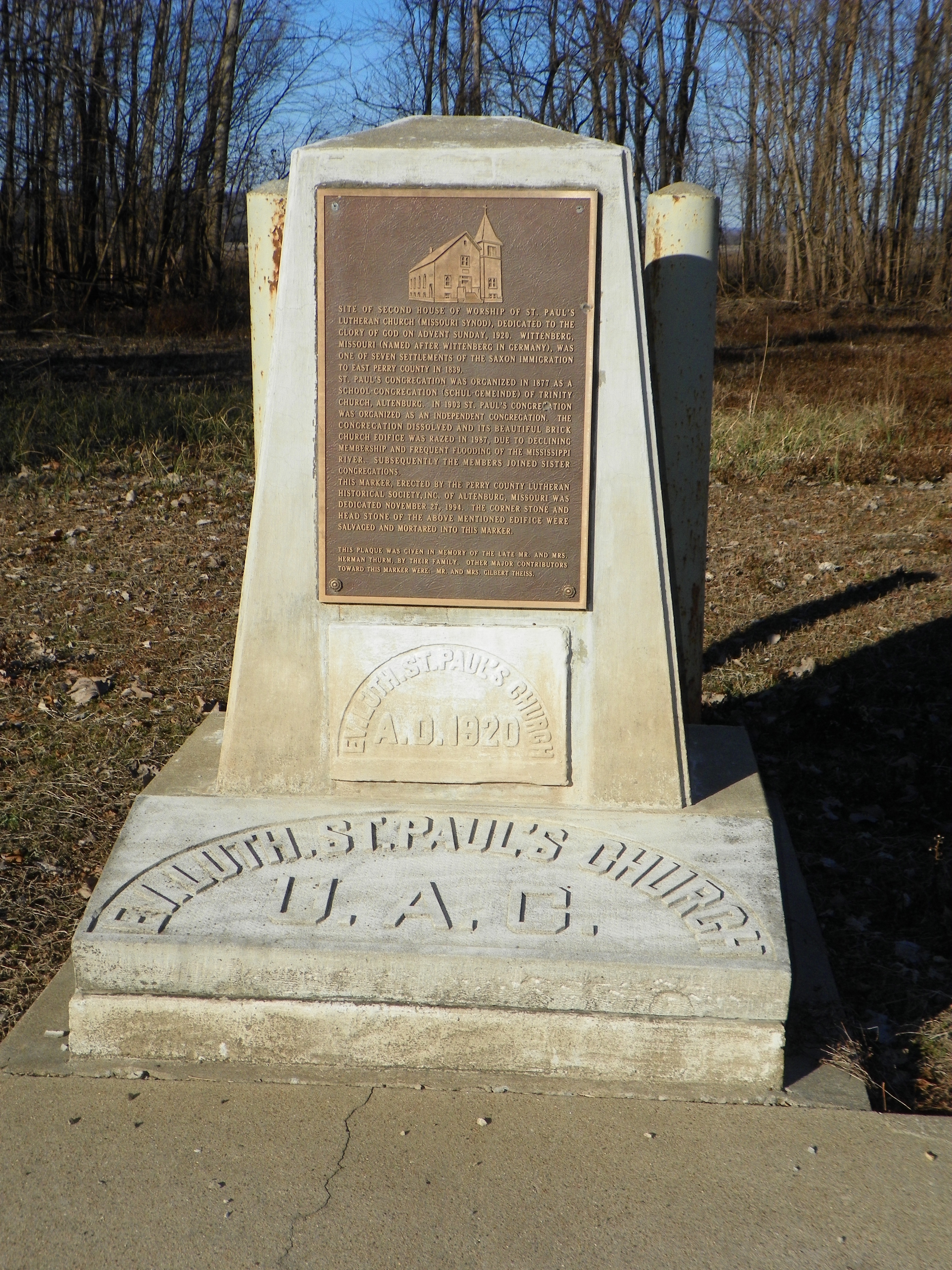
Town and church marker

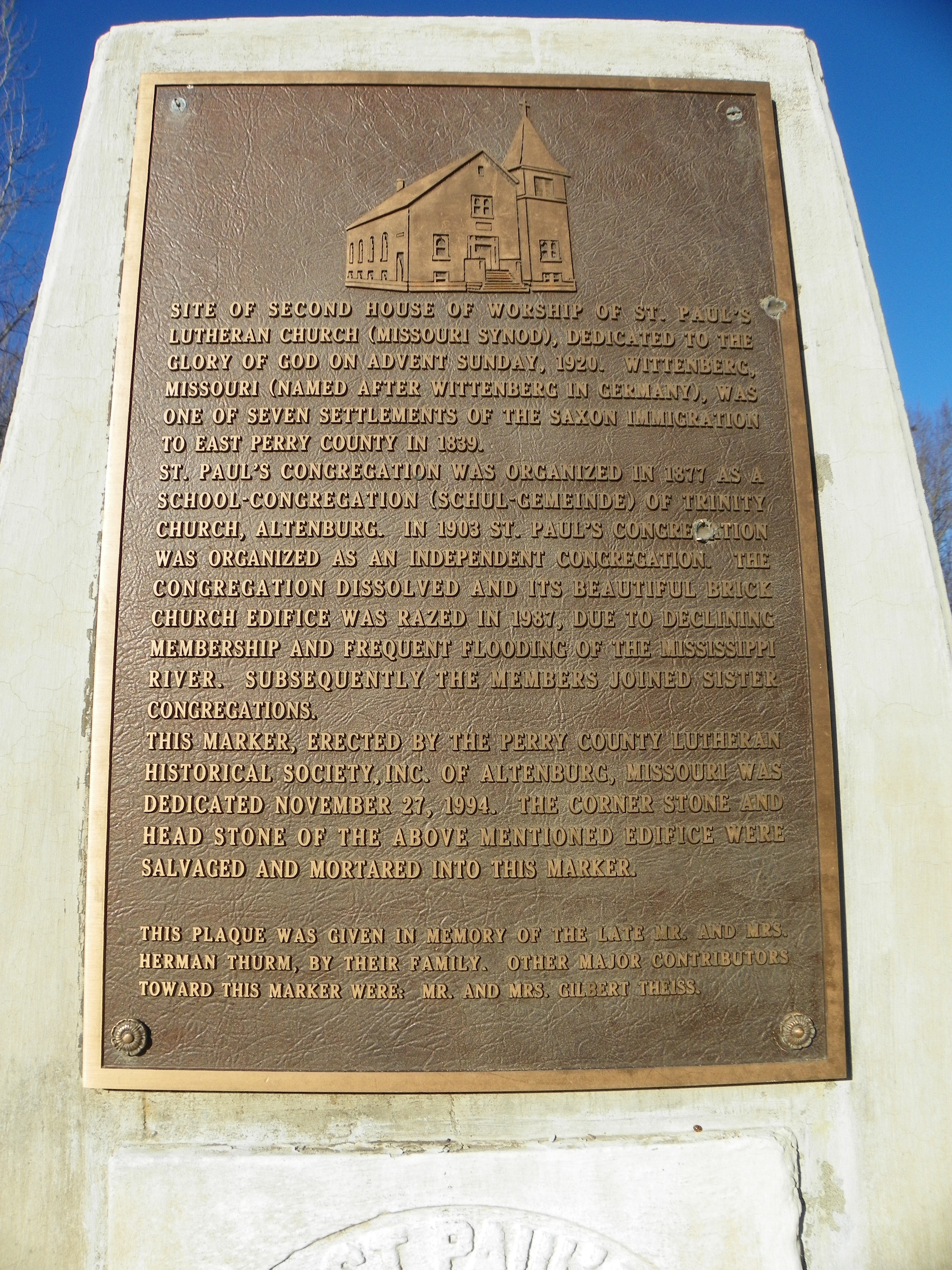
Marker

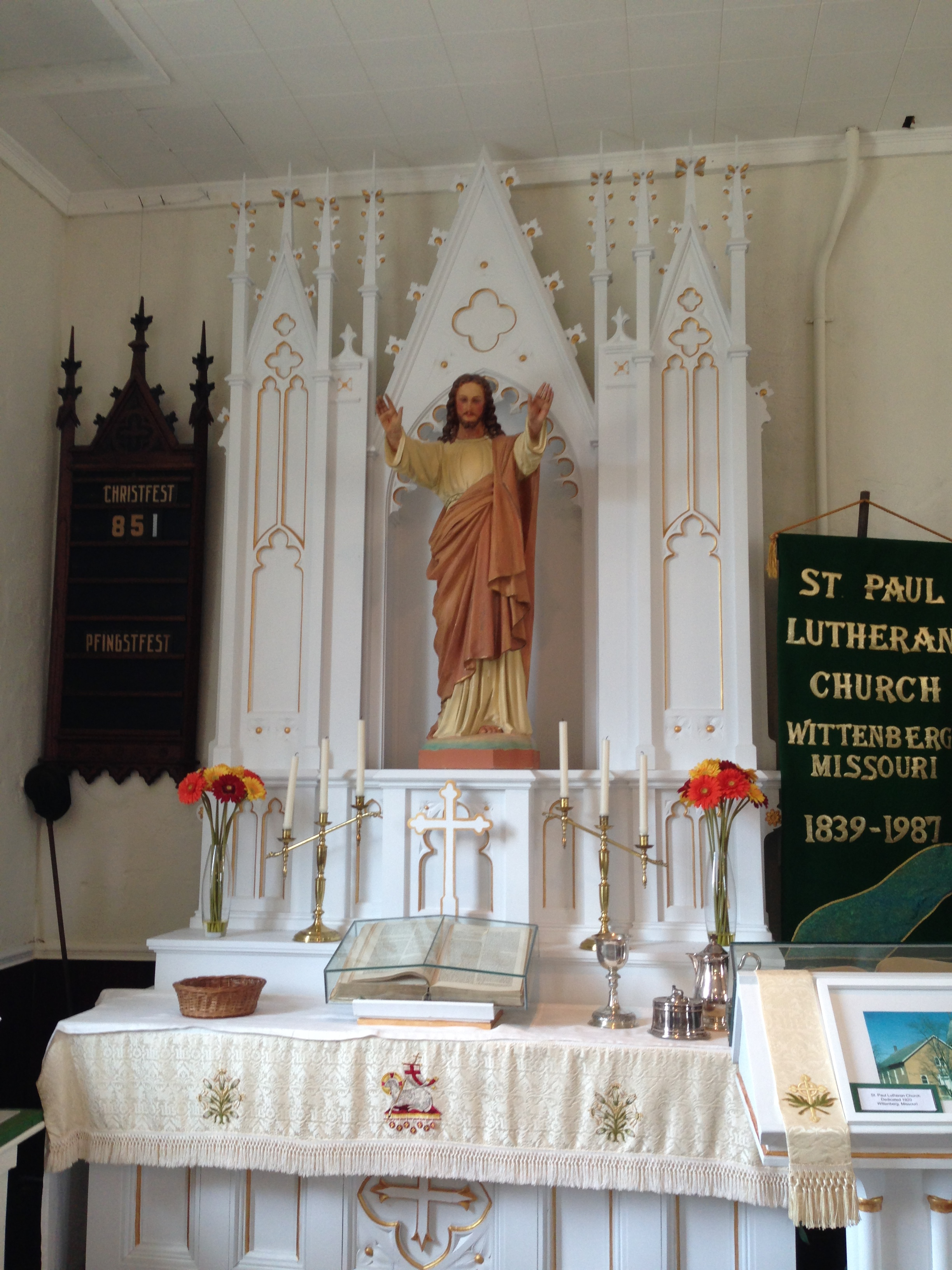
St. Paul's Lutheran Church altar

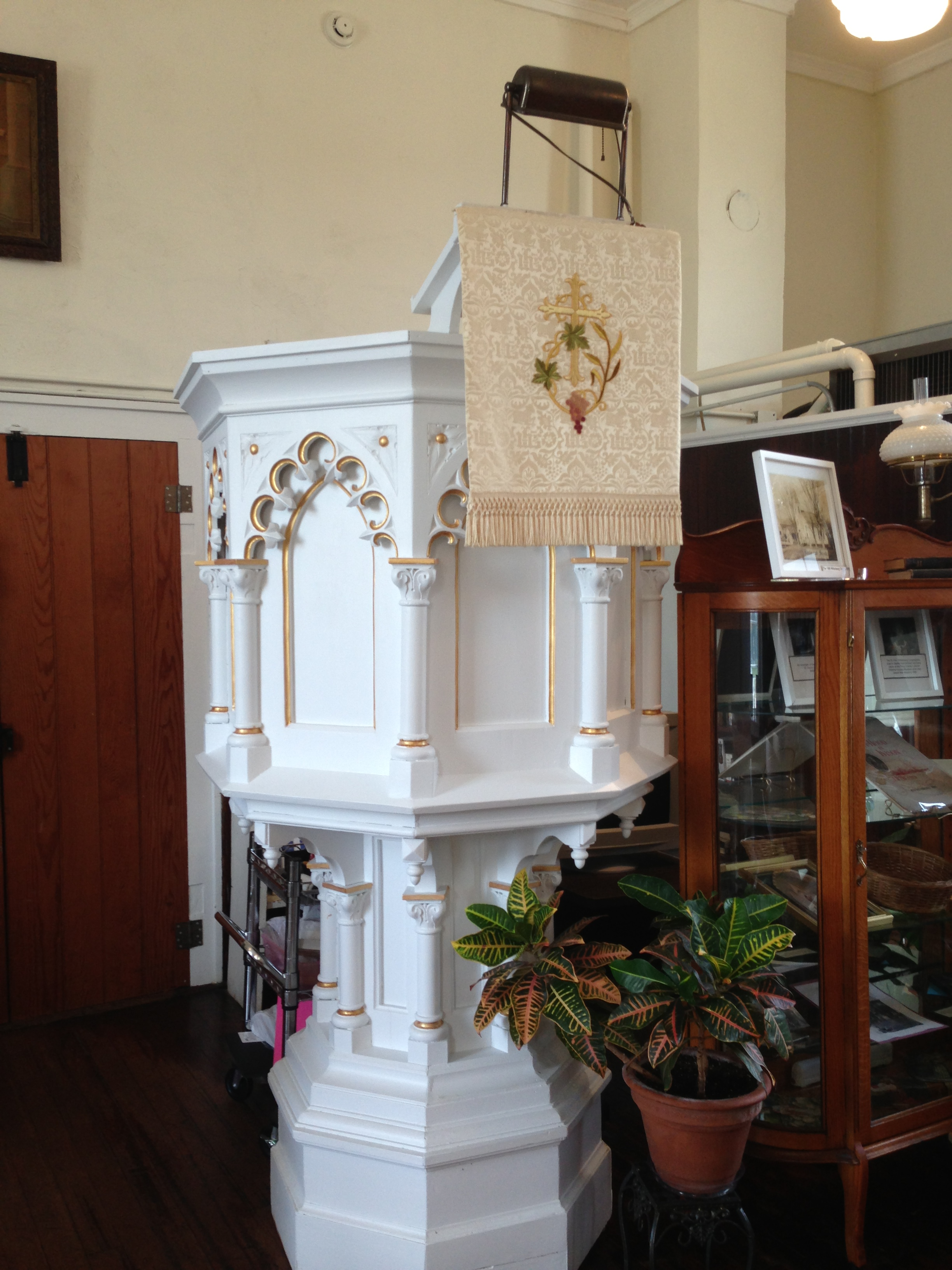
St. Paul's Lutheran Church pulpit

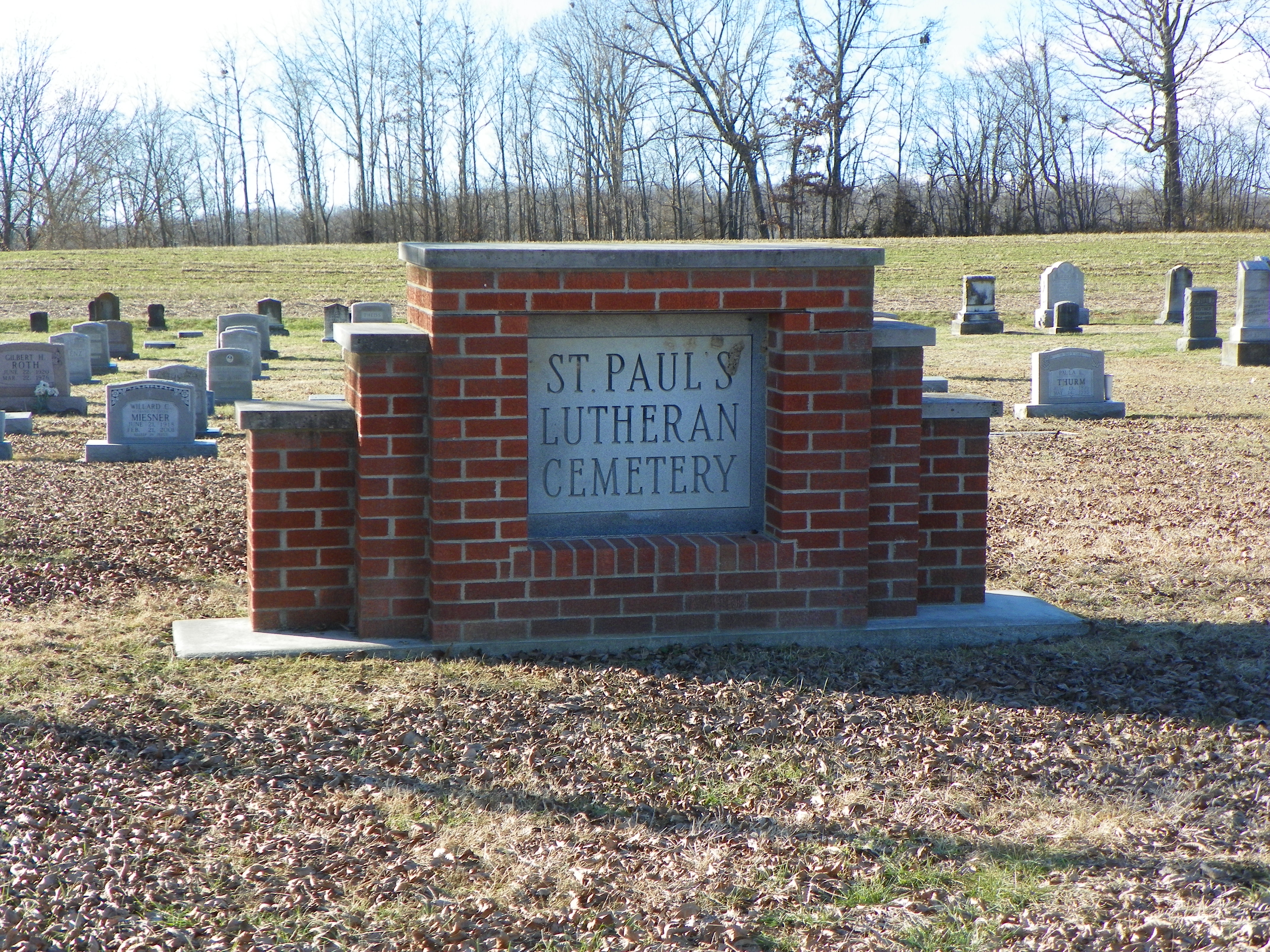
St. Paul's Cemetery

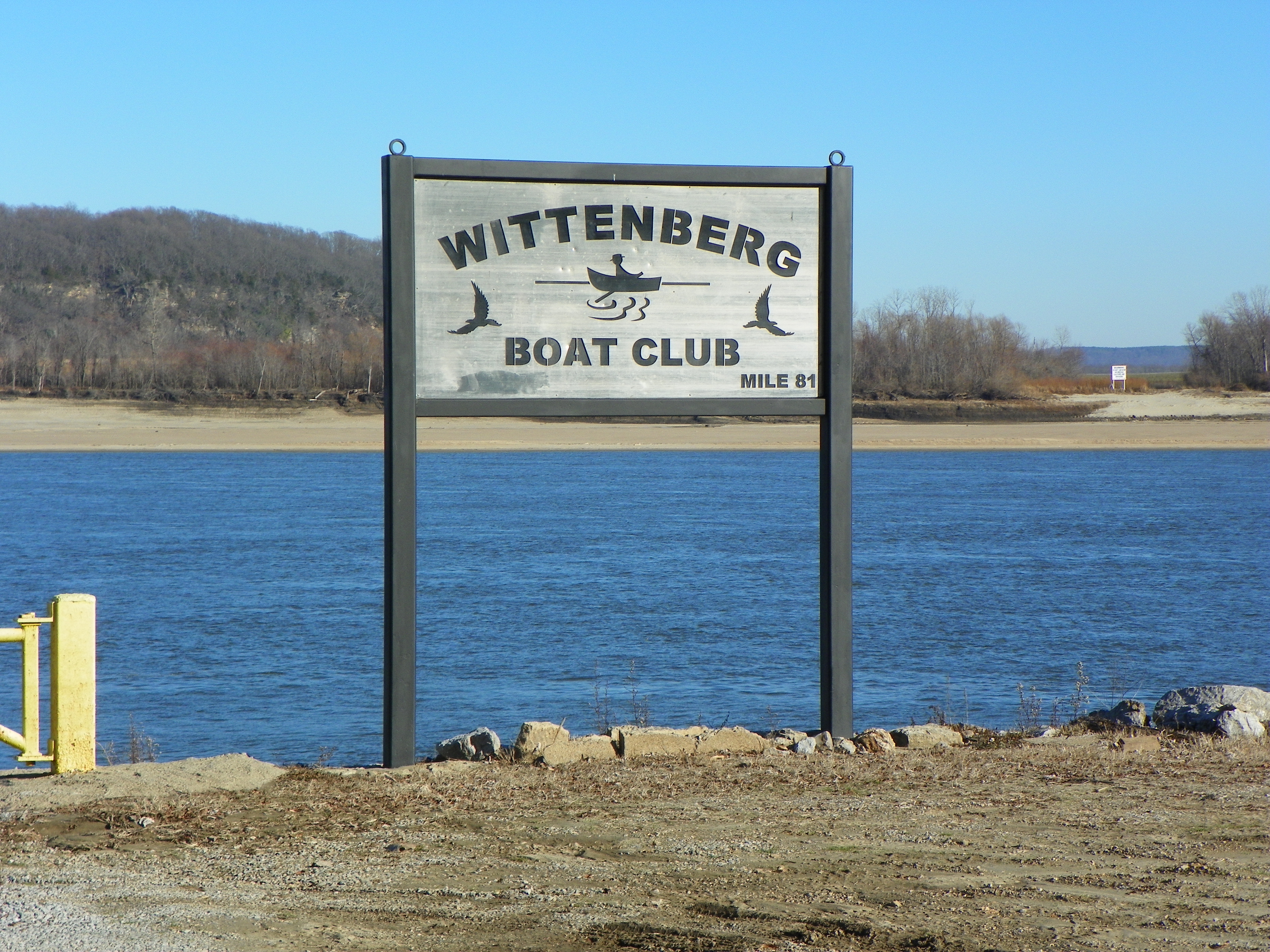
Boat club landing

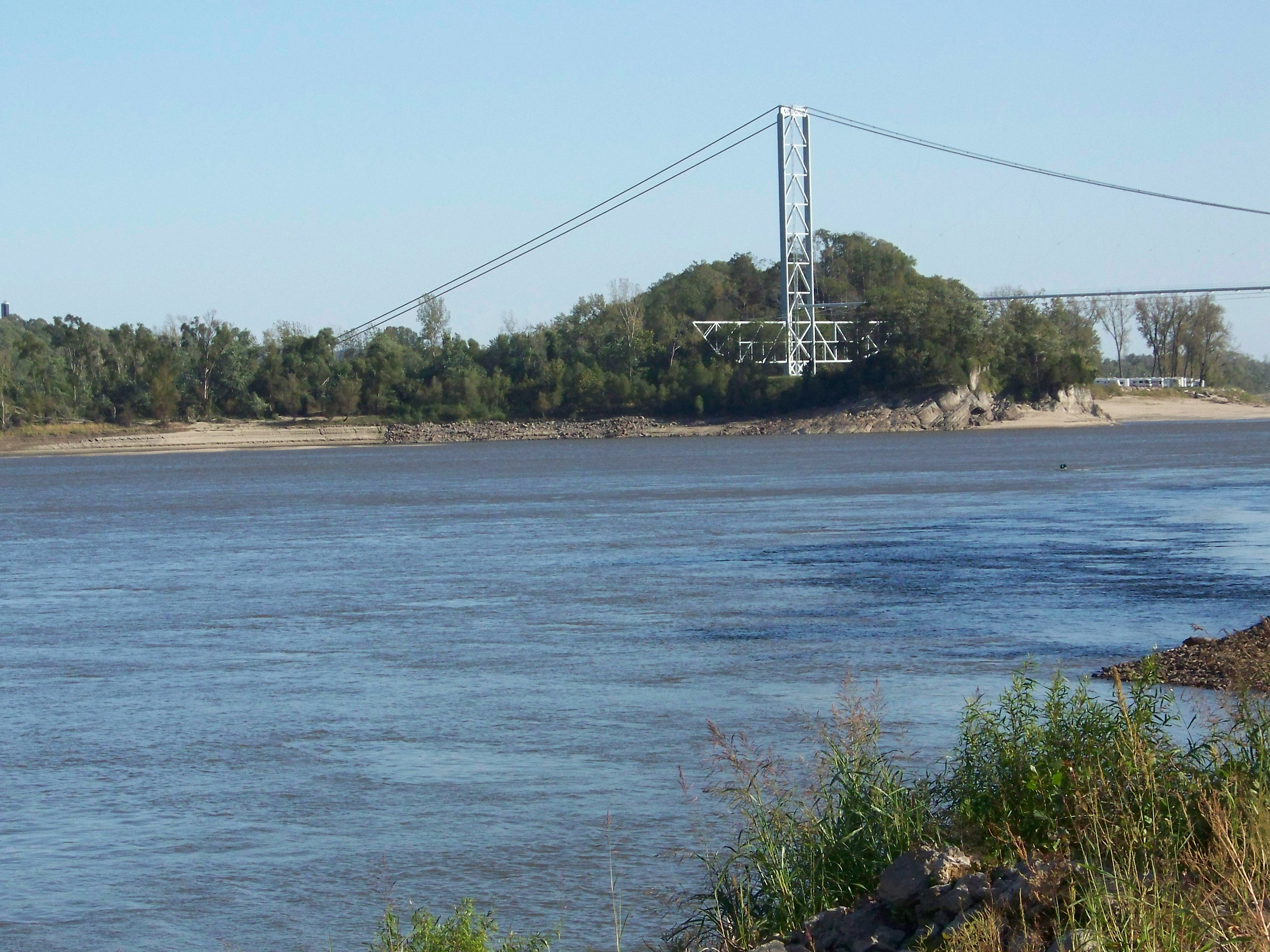
Grand Tower Pipeline Bridge
