= Fenwick Settlement, Missouri =

- Abandoned village
- Location of Perry County, Missouri
- Coordinates: 37°39′14″N 89°31′19″W
- Country: United States
- State: Missouri
- County: Perry
- Township: Brazeau
- Elevation: 564 ft (172 m)
- Time zone: UTC-6 (Central (CST))
  - Summer (DST): UTC-5 (CDT)
- GNIS Feature ID: 736917

Fenwick Settlement is an abandoned village in Perry County, Missouri, United States. The community was named after the Fenwick family, who were early settlers on the left bank of the Mississippi River in the Spanish Illinois Country.

== History ==
The colonial history of eastern Perry County begins in the late 1700s with the migration of American Catholics into the Spanish territory of Upper Louisiana. In 1797, the Spanish district commandant at New Bourbon had noticed a group of Catholics living in Kentucky. The Spanish colony saw these Americans as prospective immigrants. The head of one of the families, Joseph Fenwick, received an invitation in 1797 from district commandant Luzières to bring himself and his son, a doctor, as well as other American Catholics to settle Spanish territory. On April 18, 1797, Joseph Fenwick arrived with 25 or more Catholic families from the White Sulphur area of Kentucky, along with seventy slaves.

These American Catholics from Kentucky - descended from Irish Roman Catholic families who settled in Maryland - were referred to as “Maryland Catholics” or “English Catholics” to distinguish them from the resident French-speaking Catholics. The reference to Maryland was due to their having left Maryland in 1785 following the American Revolution, and seeking land elsewhere for a better life.

After 1803, Joseph Fenwick left New Bourbon village, possibly over issues of land-ownership or to relocate himself beyond easy reach of the colonial officials. He initially planned to settle on Apple Creek at the mouth of Indian Creek, in proximity to the villages that the Shawnee were erecting at that time. The presence of so many Indians probably caused Fenwick to give up his plans and instead establish a settlement at the mouth of Brazeau Creek in the Brazeau Bottoms on the Mississippi River. This small settlement was named Fenwick Settlement, after its founder. The settlement grew to about 20 families with the arrival of more Catholic families from Kentucky. However, the location of the settlement was not particularly amenable to farming and the settlement did not prosper. By 1807-1808, the Fenwick group began to drift away.

== GNIS reference ==
The Geographic Names Information System has an entry for the Fenwick Settlement with a location of unknown.
