= Brazeau Bottom =

Flooplain in Missouri, U.S.

- Floodplain
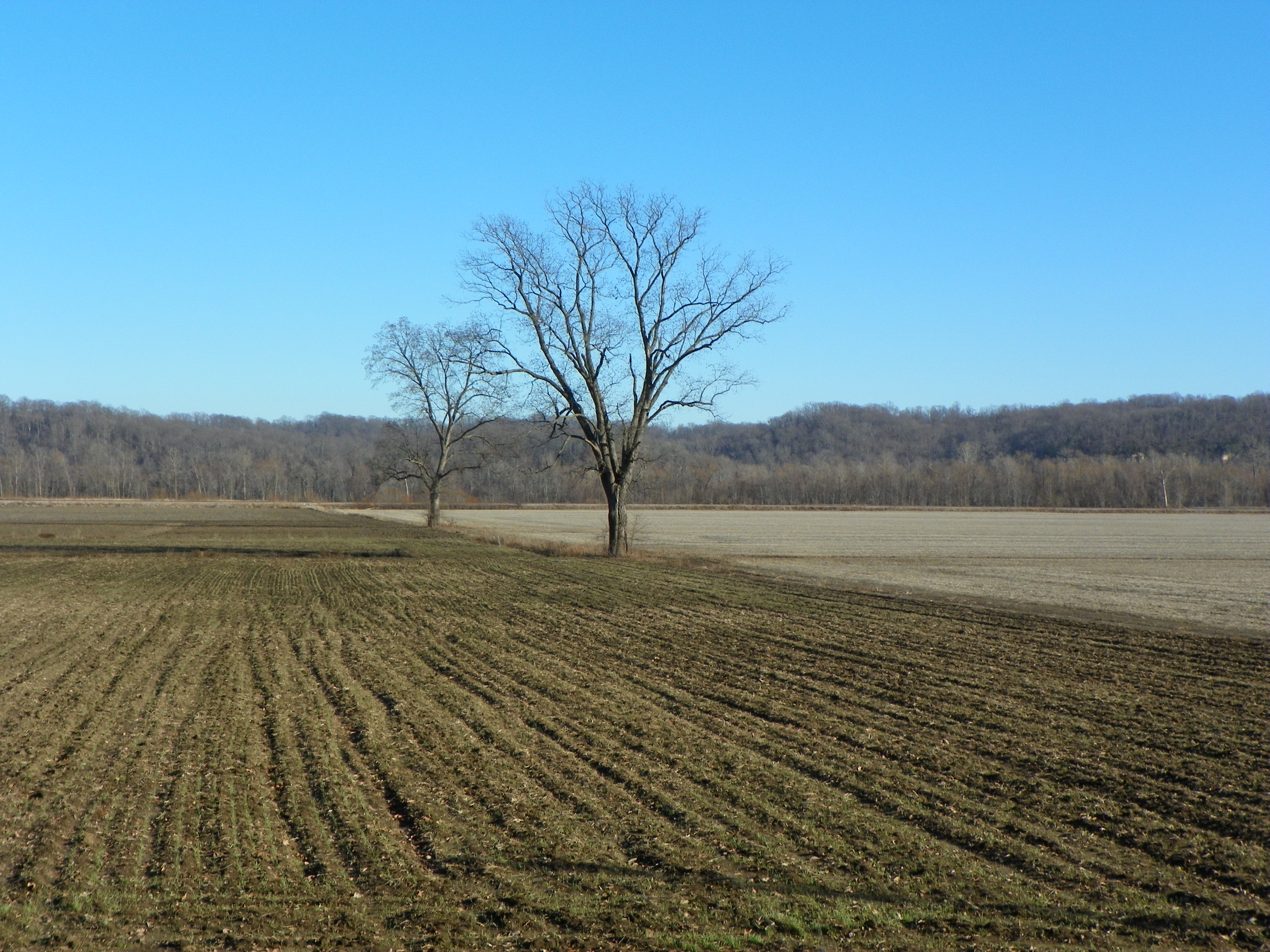
- Brazeau Bottoms in winter
- Interactive map of Brazeau Bottom
- Coordinates: 37°40′25″N 89°32′33″W
- Location: Missouri, United States
- Elevation: 112 m (368 ft)

The Brazeau Bottom is an alluvial floodplain, also called a 'flat', extending along the Mississippi River in Perry County, Missouri.

The Brazeau Bottom lies below the American and Bois Brule bottoms along the Mississippi River. The flat bottomland on the western bank of the Mississippi River is broken by a series of rocky bluffs, including the Red Rock Landing Conservation Area and the Seventy-Six Conservation Area, which stretch for about 10 miles. Brazeau Bottom runs for about 3 miles below this series of rocky bluffs. Brazeau Creek forms the southernmost border of the Brazeau Bottom.

== Etymology ==
The bottom is named for the nearby Brazeau Creek, which in turn was named for Joseph Brazeau (also spelled Obrazo) a merchant from St. Louis, Missouri in the years 1791–1799, or a member of his family.

== History ==
The area was first granted by the Spanish colonial authorities to Joseph Manning, with the first European settler in the Brazeau Bottom was George A. Hamilton, a Catholic from Maryland. Hamilton had lived in New Madrid and received permission from Spanish authorities to settle in the Brazeau Bottom in 1797. Other early settlers in the Brazeau Bottom were Hinckson who settled in 1800; Joseph James who settled in 1801, under the verbal permission of the De Luziere, the colonial commandant of New Bourbon, David L. Johnson (1802), William Johnson from Kentucky who settled in 1802, Charles Duncaster, and Samuel Hinch. In 1803, Joseph Fenwick and twenty other Kentucky Catholics established the Fenwick Settlement at the mouth of the Brazeau Creek. The German Saxon Lutheran immigration of 1838-39 brought numerous German settlers to the area and the establishment of Wittenberg.

== Flooding ==
A number of floods have struck over the centuries, with the floods of 1927 and 1973 causing immense damage. The Flood of 1973 destroyed most of the businesses in Wittenberg and drove out most of the residents.

== Geography ==
The Brazeau Bottom is located in the southeast corner of Perry County, Missouri and has an elevation of 368 ft. (109 m.). Brazeau Creek flows through Brazeau Bottom and empties into the Mississippi near Wittenberg. The 2,161 foot long Grand Tower Pipeline Bridge carries a natural gas pipeline across the Mississippi River at Wittenberg to Grand Tower, Illinois. At the southern end of Brazeau Bottom lies the rock formation Tower Rock. To the east just across the Mississippi River lies Grand Tower Island, which although lying east of the Mississippi River, nonetheless is part of Perry County, Missouri.

== Communities in Brazeau Bottom ==
- Fenwick Settlement
- Wittenberg

== Gallery ==
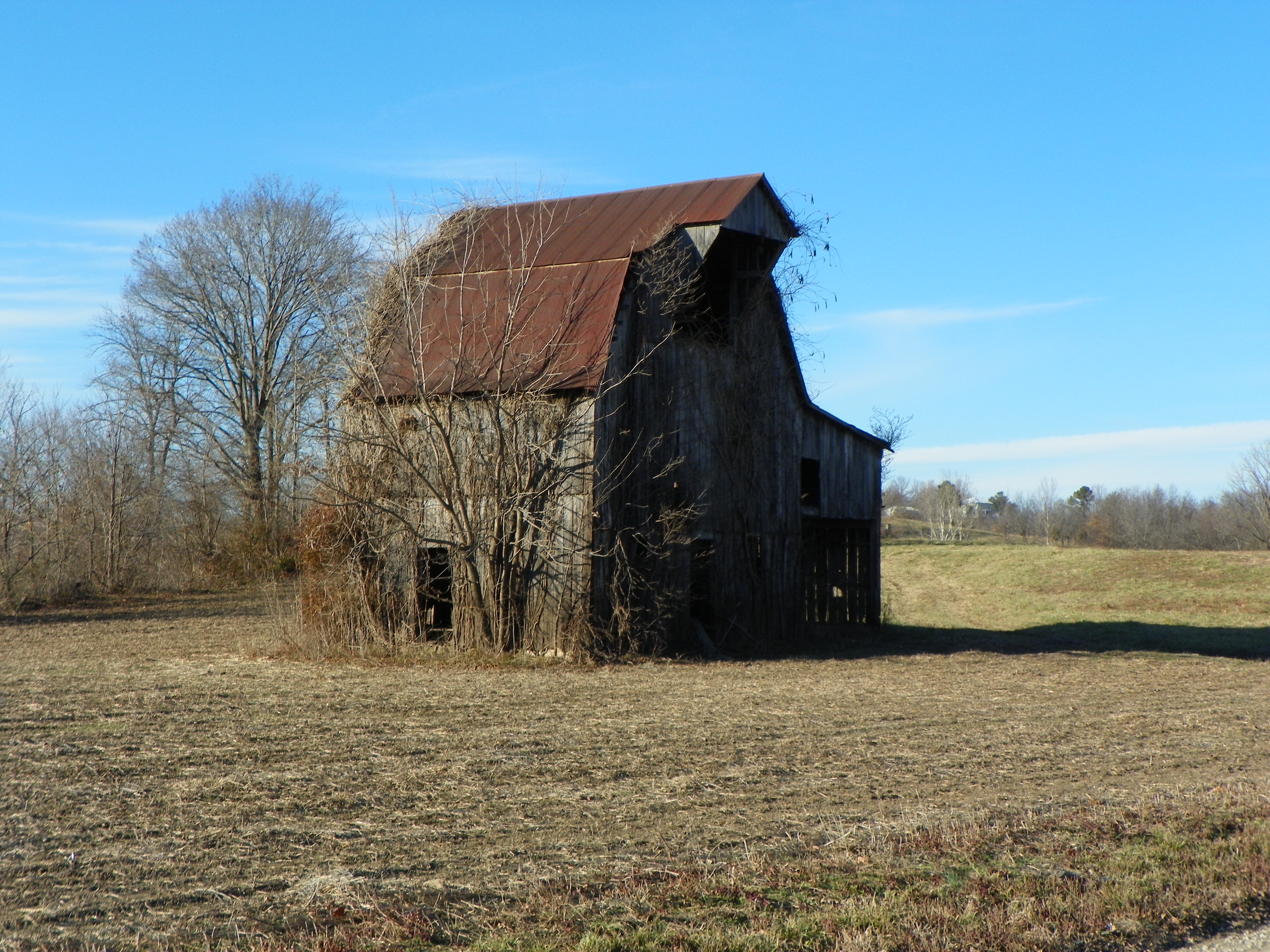
Old Barn in the bottoms

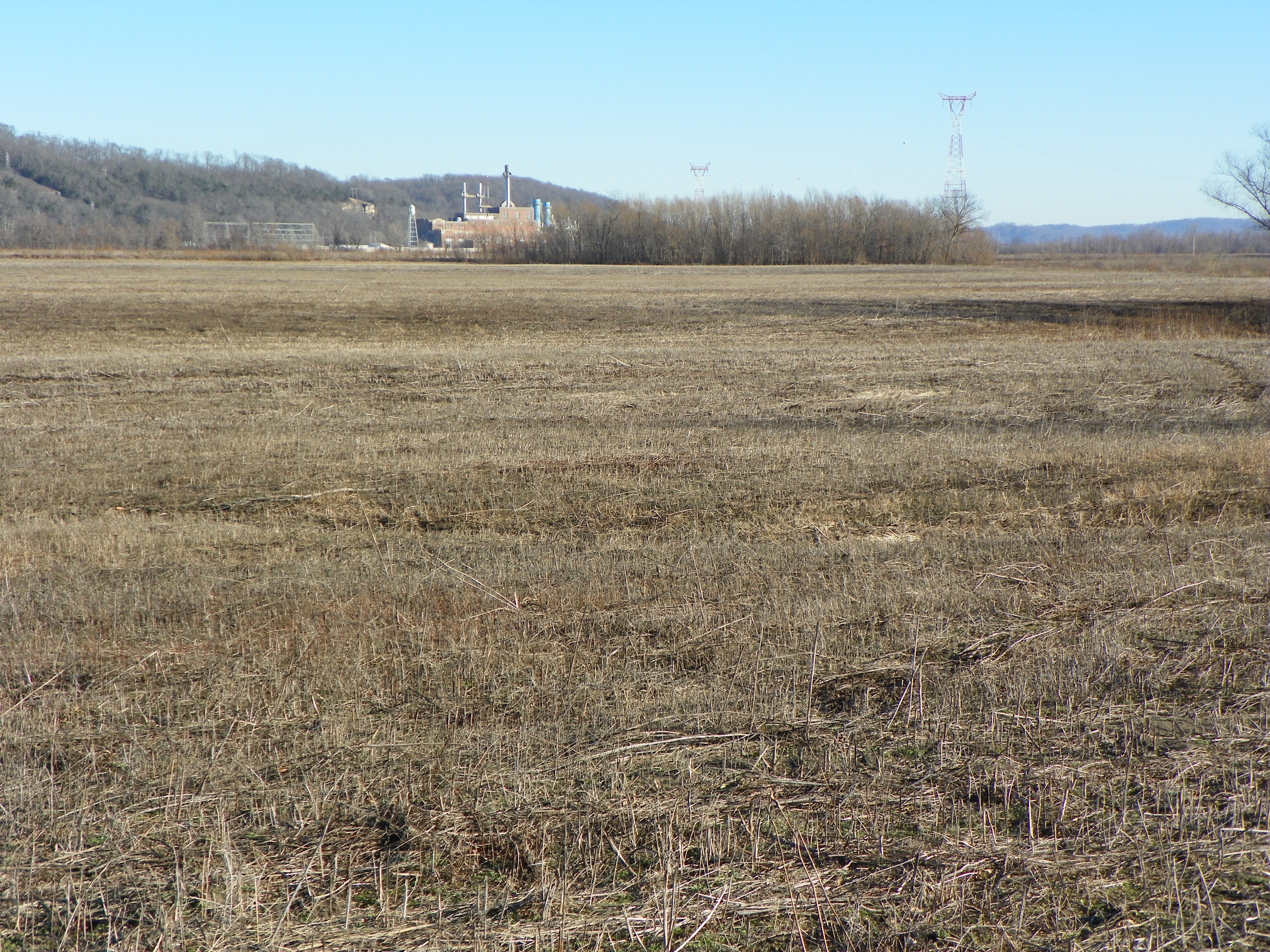
Bottomland with power plant in background

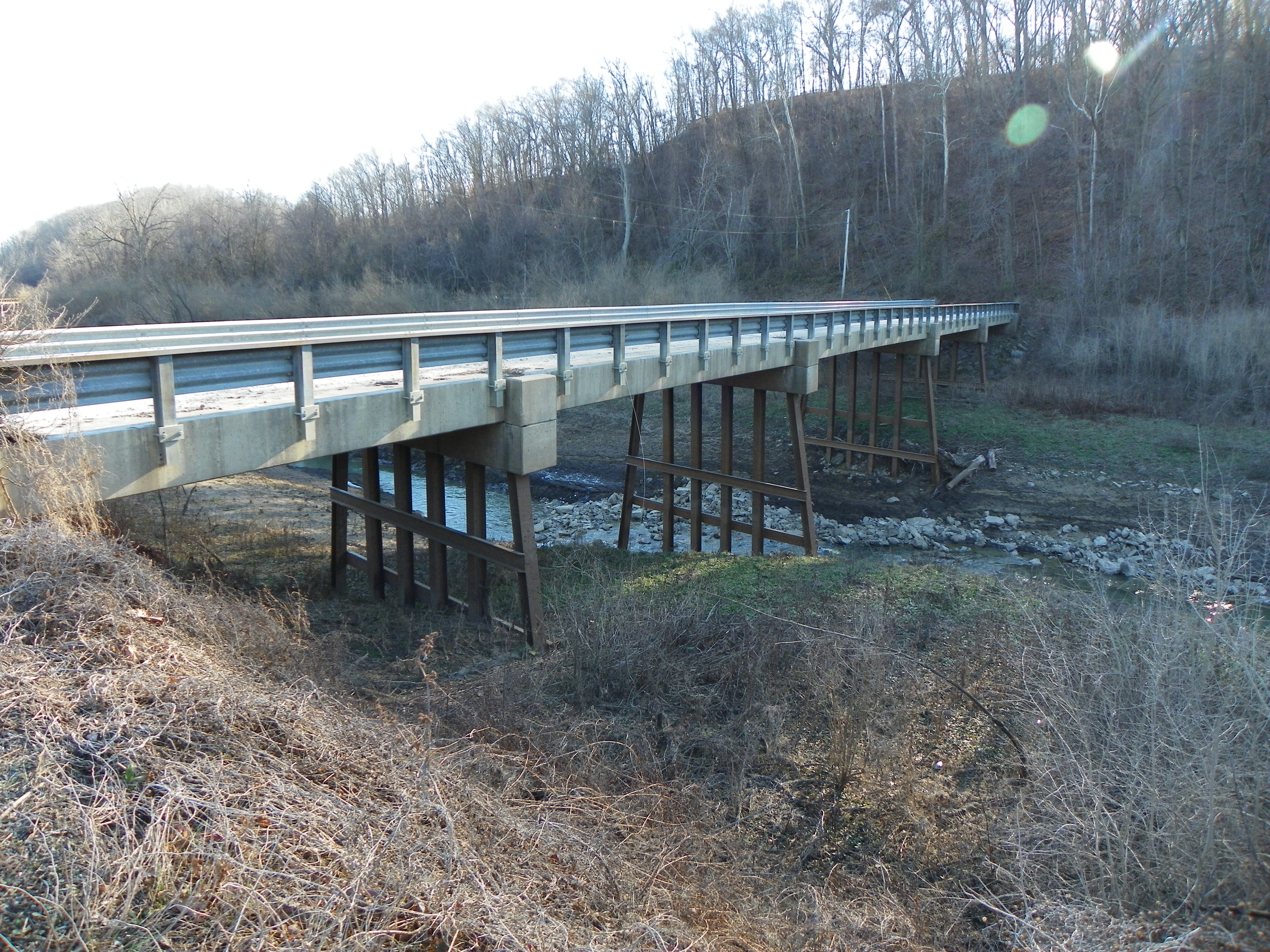
Bridge over Brazeau Creek

== See also ==
- Perry County, Missouri
- American Bottom
- Bois Brule Bottom
- Le Grand Champ Bottom
