= Brazeau Presbyterian Church =

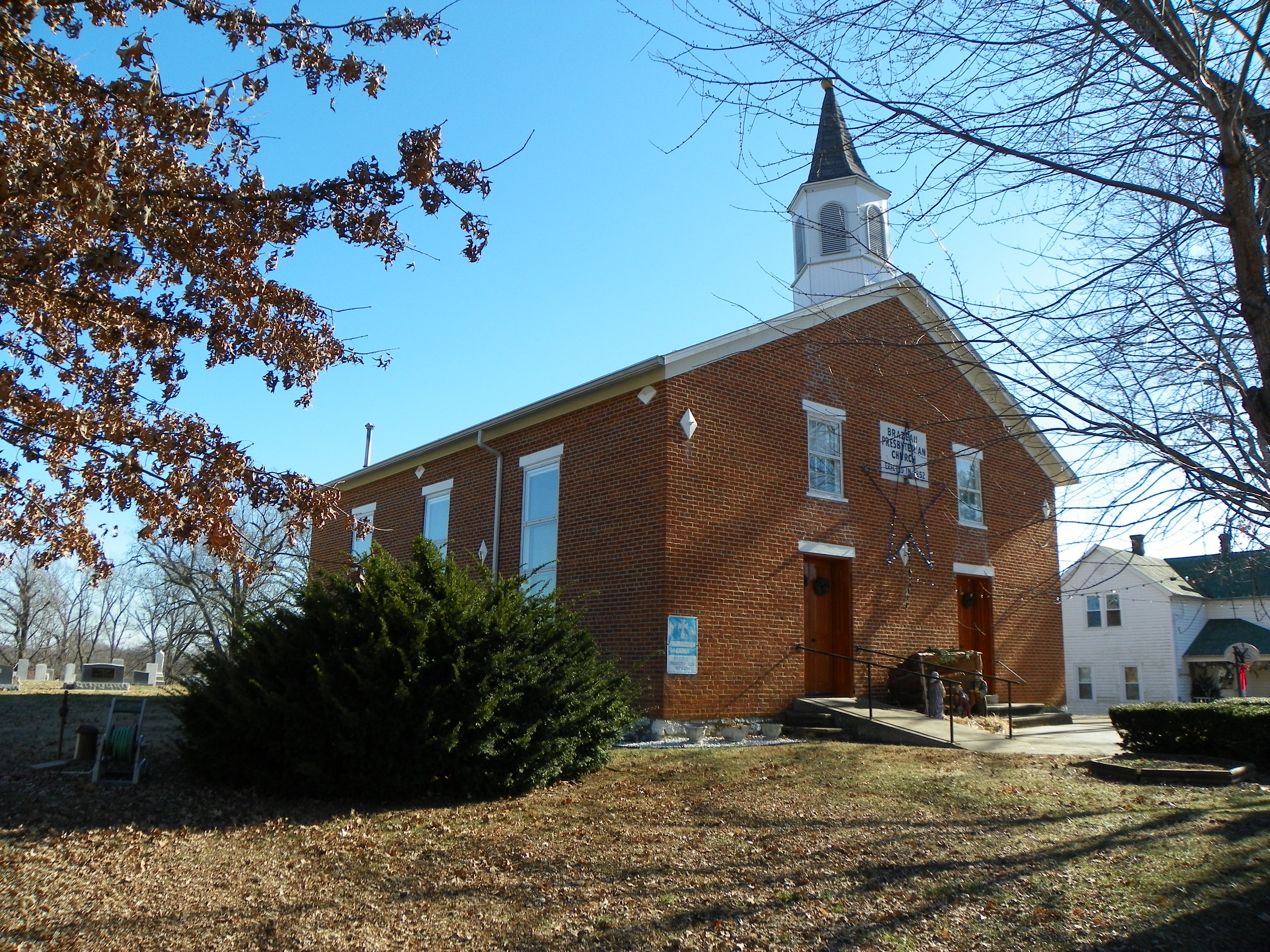
- Brazeau Presbyterian Church building

- Location within Missouri
- 37°39′40″N 89°39′10″W
- Location: 106 Church Ln., Brazeau, Missouri, 63737-8701
- Country: United States
- Denomination: Evangelical Presbyterian Church

History
- Founded: August 2, 1819
- Founder: David Tenney
- Consecrated: current building: 1854

Brazeau Presbyterian Church is a congregation of the Evangelical Presbyterian Church located in Brazeau, Missouri.

== History ==
The history of the church begins with English and Scots-Irish Presbyterian settlers from Rowan, Iredell, Cabarrus, and Mecklenburg counties in North Carolina, and they settled Brazeau in 1817. The church was established in 1819 by David Tenney and had 20 members, with services held in a small log cabin. In 1833, after a fire destroyed the log cabin church, a new frame church was built to replace the previous church. In 1851, a new brick church was planned and, after several difficulties, was completed in 1854. The church had two entry doors equally spaced on the front - one for women, and one for men; on the inside, there are two pairs of stairs, 4 feet wide, going up to the gallery. The church is topped by a six-sided belfry. There were three window bays on each side of the church. The first parsonage was constructed in 1857, the second one in 1906. In 1964, the church merged with two other denominations to become the United Christian Cooperative Parish. P.O. 1879-date. Membership peaked at around 200 in the 1880s, but dissension caused a reorganization in 1890 which resulted in only 60 members remaining. However, by 1894 its membership had risen to 100 members

== Congregation ==
Brazeau Presbyterian Church is a member of the Evangelical Presbyterian Church, and is organized within the Presbytery of Mid-America. The position of pastor is currently held by Christopher Seah.

== Gallery ==
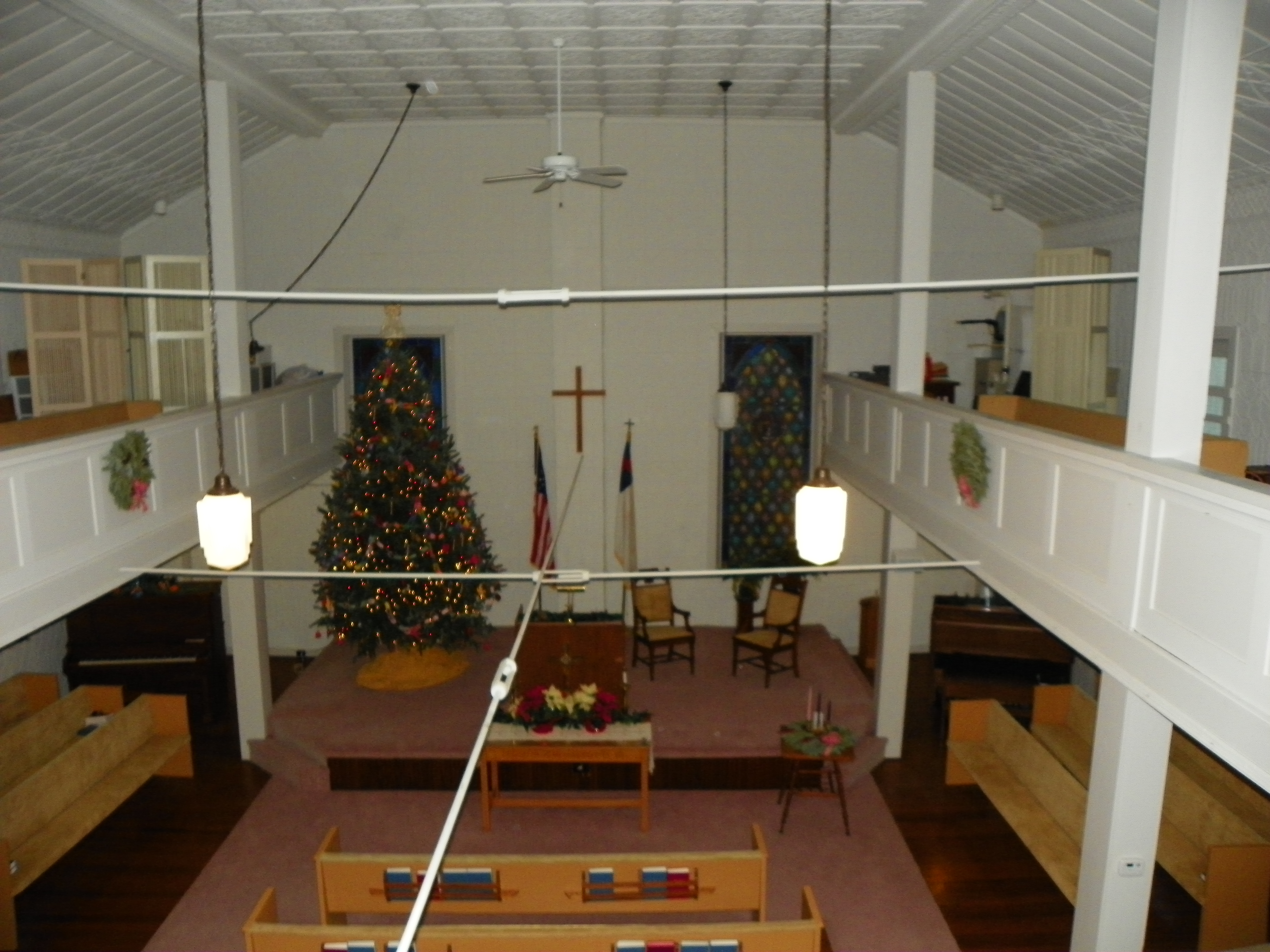
Church interior

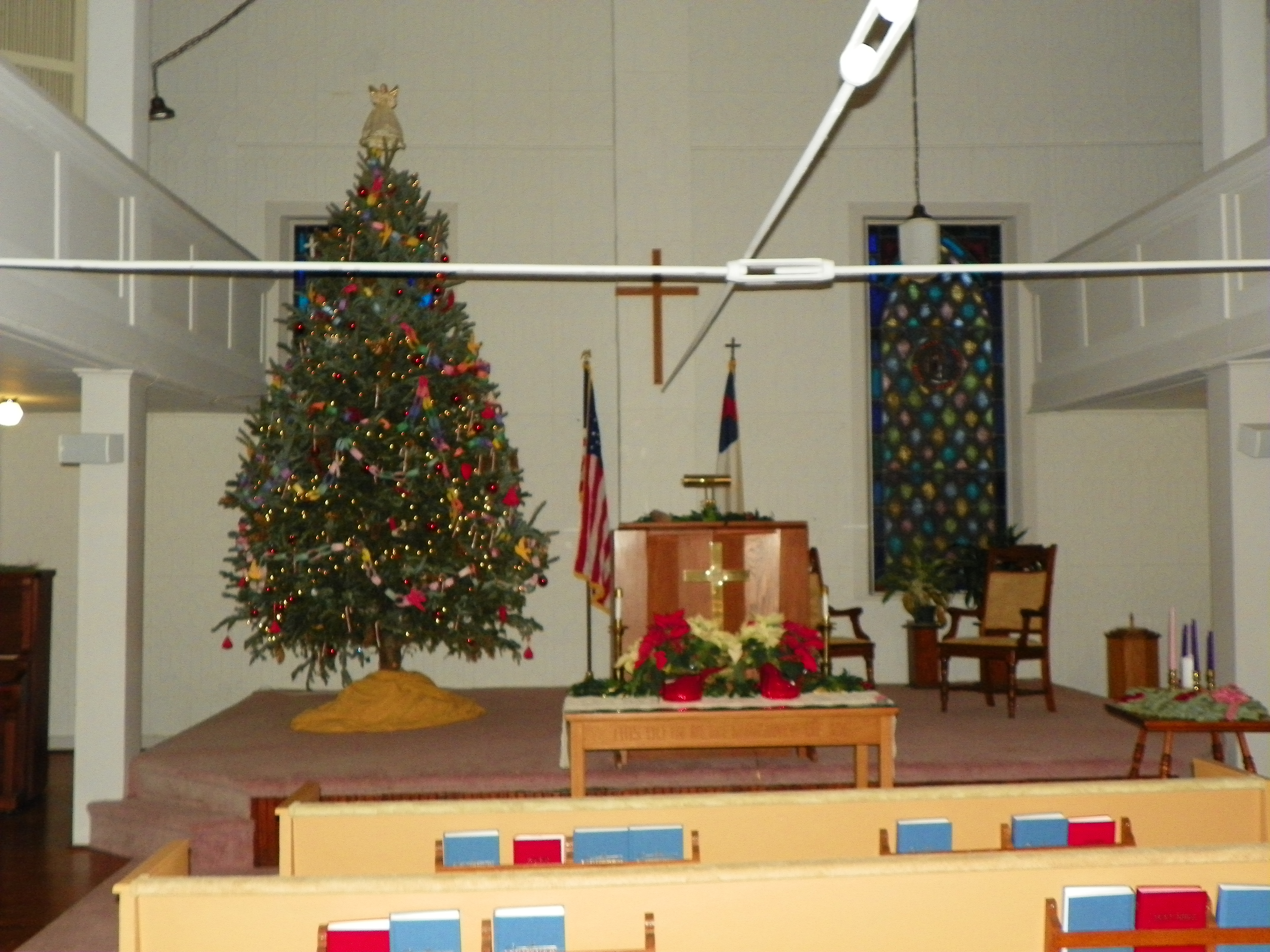
Church altar
