= Brazeau, Missouri =

- Unincorporated community
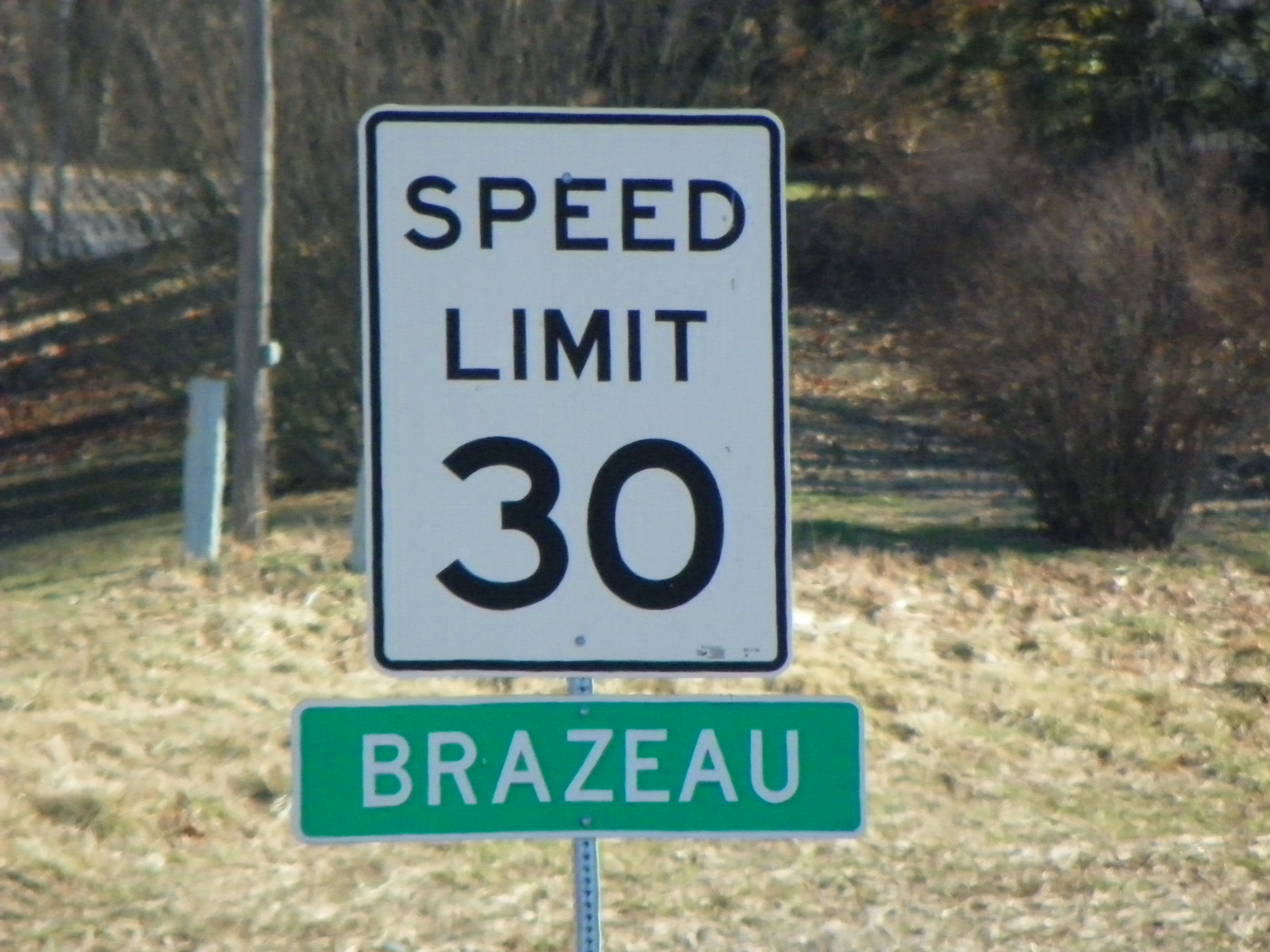
- Brazeau, Missouri, road sign

- Location of Perry County
- Coordinates: 37°39′40″N 89°39′10″W
- Country: United States
- State: Missouri
- County: Perry
- Township: Brazeau
- Elevation: 561 ft (171 m)

Population (2010)
  - Total: 23
  - Estimate: 23
- Time zone: UTC-6 (Central (CST))
  - Summer (DST): UTC-5 (CDT)
- ZIP code: 63737
- Area code: 573
- FIPS code: 29-08074
- GNIS feature ID: 1779791

Brazeau (/ˈbræzɔː/; French pronunciation: [bʁazo]) is an unincorporated community in southeastern Perry County, Missouri, United States.

== Etymology ==
The community is named after the nearby Brazeau Creek, which in turn was named for Joseph Brazeau (also spelled Obrazo), a merchant from St. Louis, Missouri, in 1791–1799, or by a member of his family.

== History ==
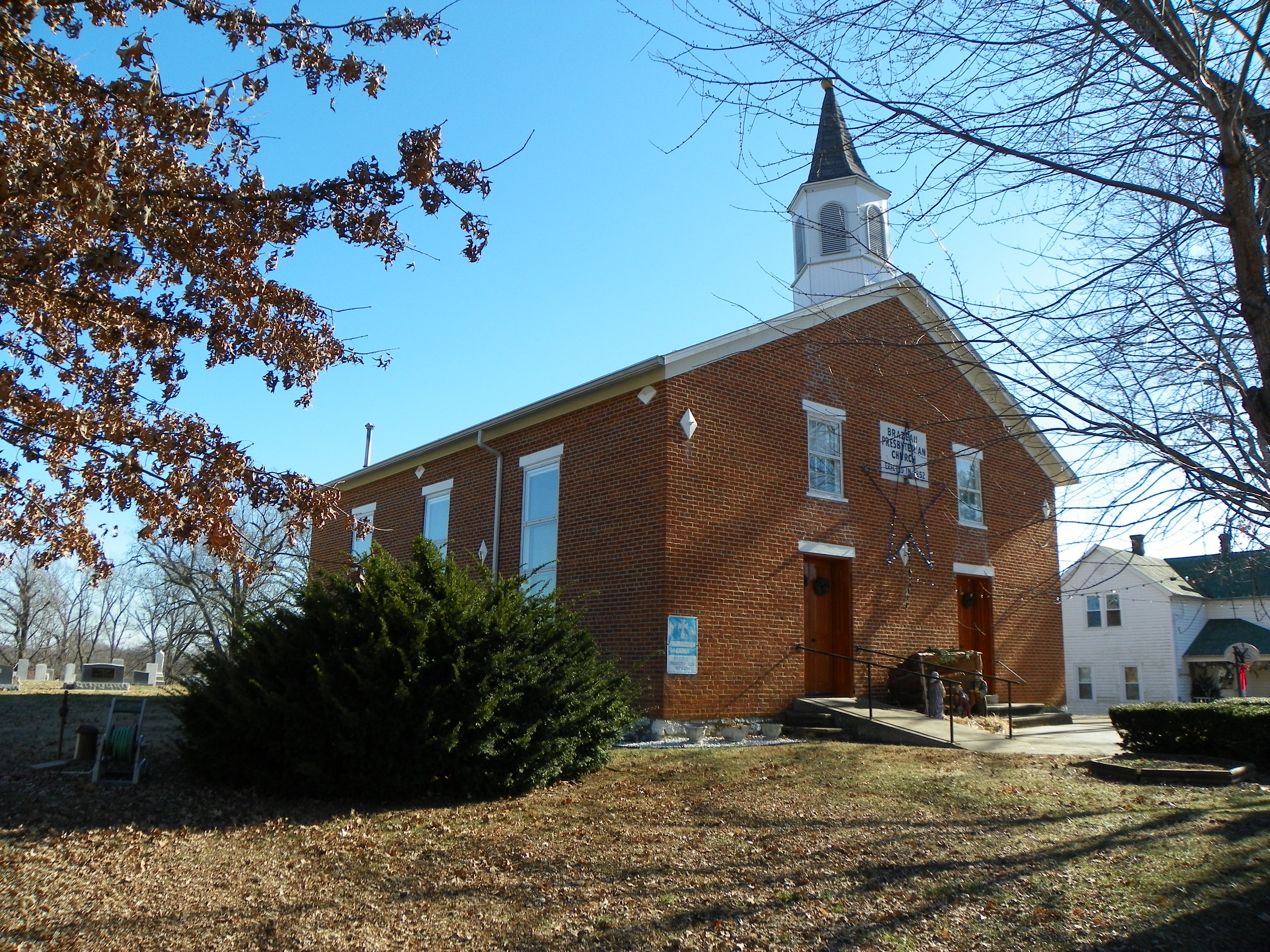
Brazeau Presbyterian Church

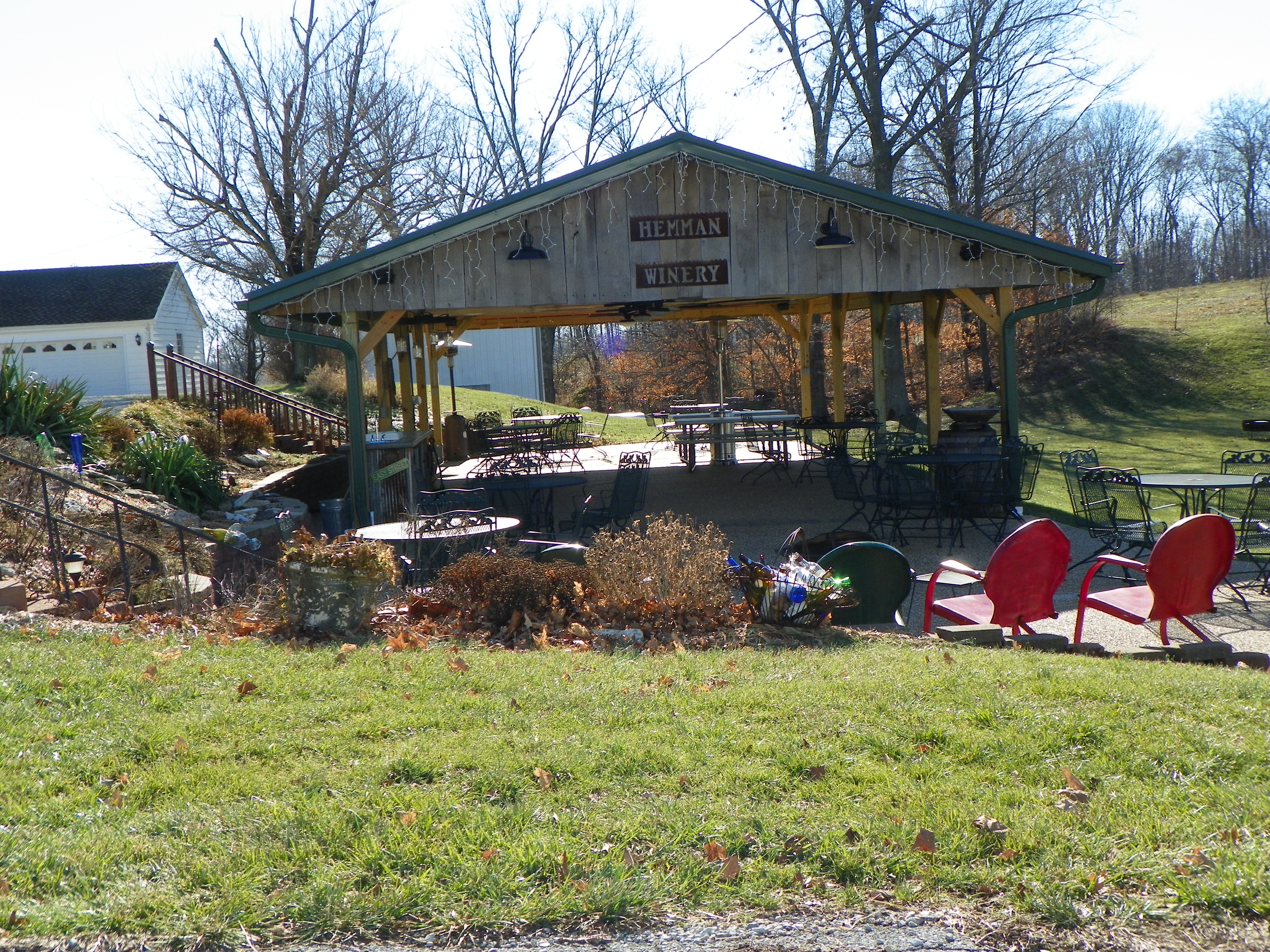
Hemmann Winery

Some of the earliest Americans to put down roots in Perry County were English and Scots-Irish Presbyterian settlers from Rowan, Iredell, Cabarrus, and Mecklenburg counties in North Carolina who settled Brazeau in 1817. There, they opened land in the Brazeau Creek drainage basin. In 1804, Brazeau was estimated to have had 88 inhabitants. The Evangelical Presbyterian Church of Brazeau was established on September 2, 1819, and a log church was erected. After a fire destroyed the log church in 1832, a new frame church was built in 1833 to replace the lost structure. A brick church, which is still in use, was built in 1854. An academy was established in the same year until public schools became prevalent in the 1880s. The people of Brazeau are said to have helped the Saxon-Lutheran immigrants from Germany during their first hard winter of 1839, saving them from possible starvation.

The Brazeau Post Office operated from 1879 until its closing in 2011. The small town once boasted a general store, a bank, and a John Deere dealership. Today, the small town is home to Hemmann Winery, established in 2003, which occupies the former general store.

== Geography ==
Brazeau is located approximately ten miles (16 km) southeast of Perryville and about 35 miles (56 km) north of Cape Girardeau, as well as being about five miles (8.0 km) from the Mississippi River.

== Notable people ==
- Edward Robb (1857–1934), a U.S. Representative who was born in Brazeau and attended Brazeau Academy

== Gallery ==
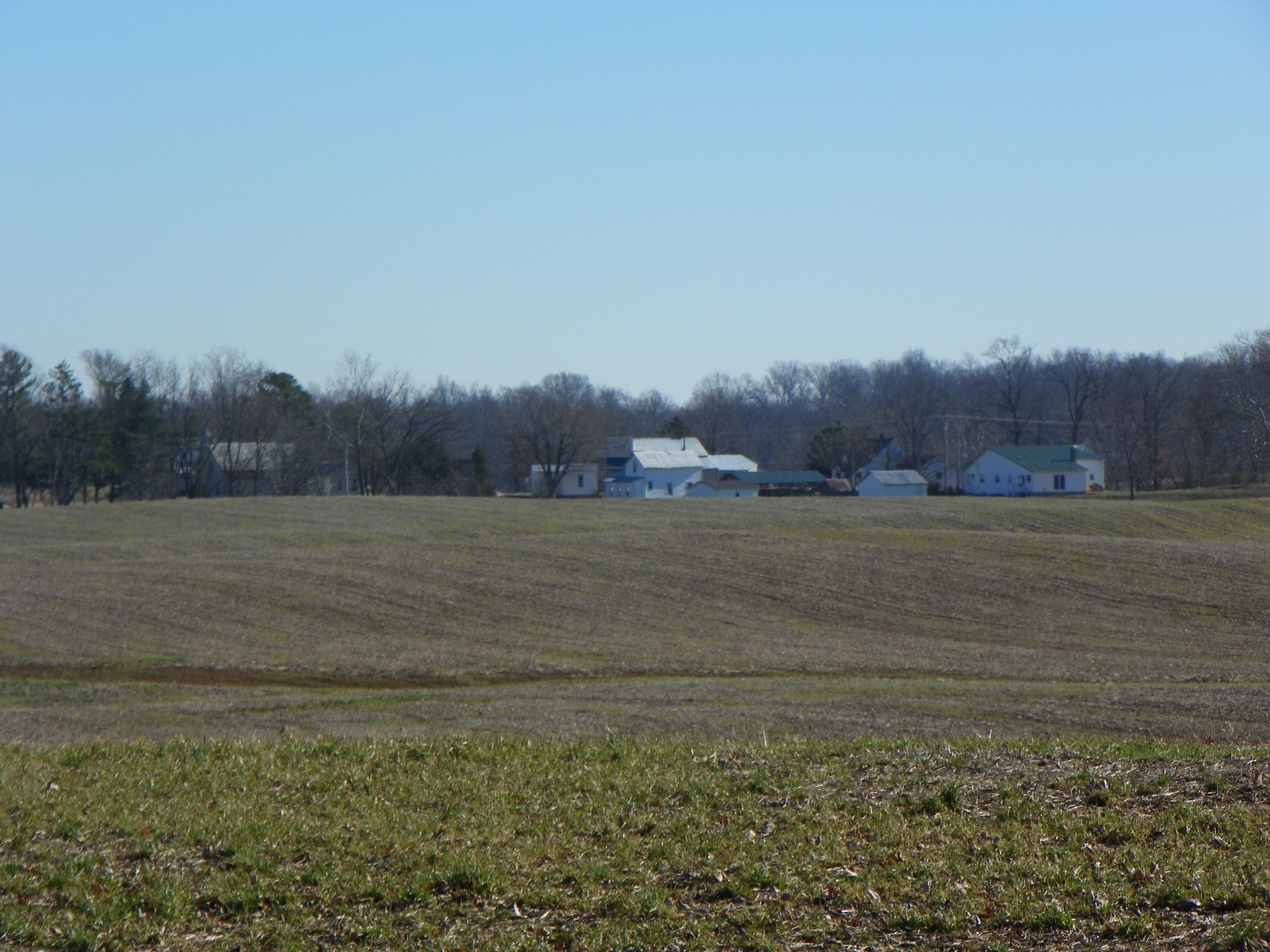
Brazeau, Missouri

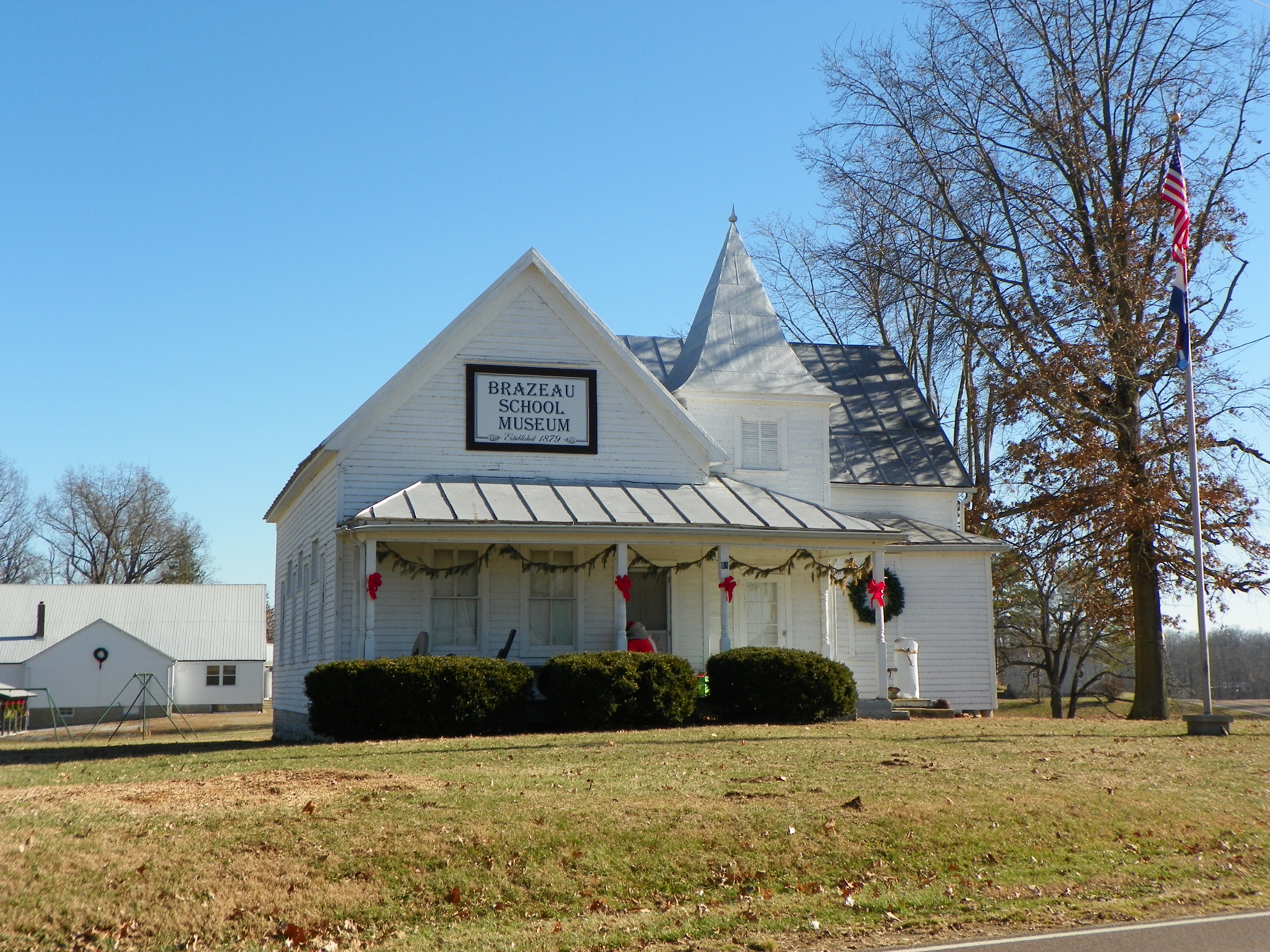
School Museum

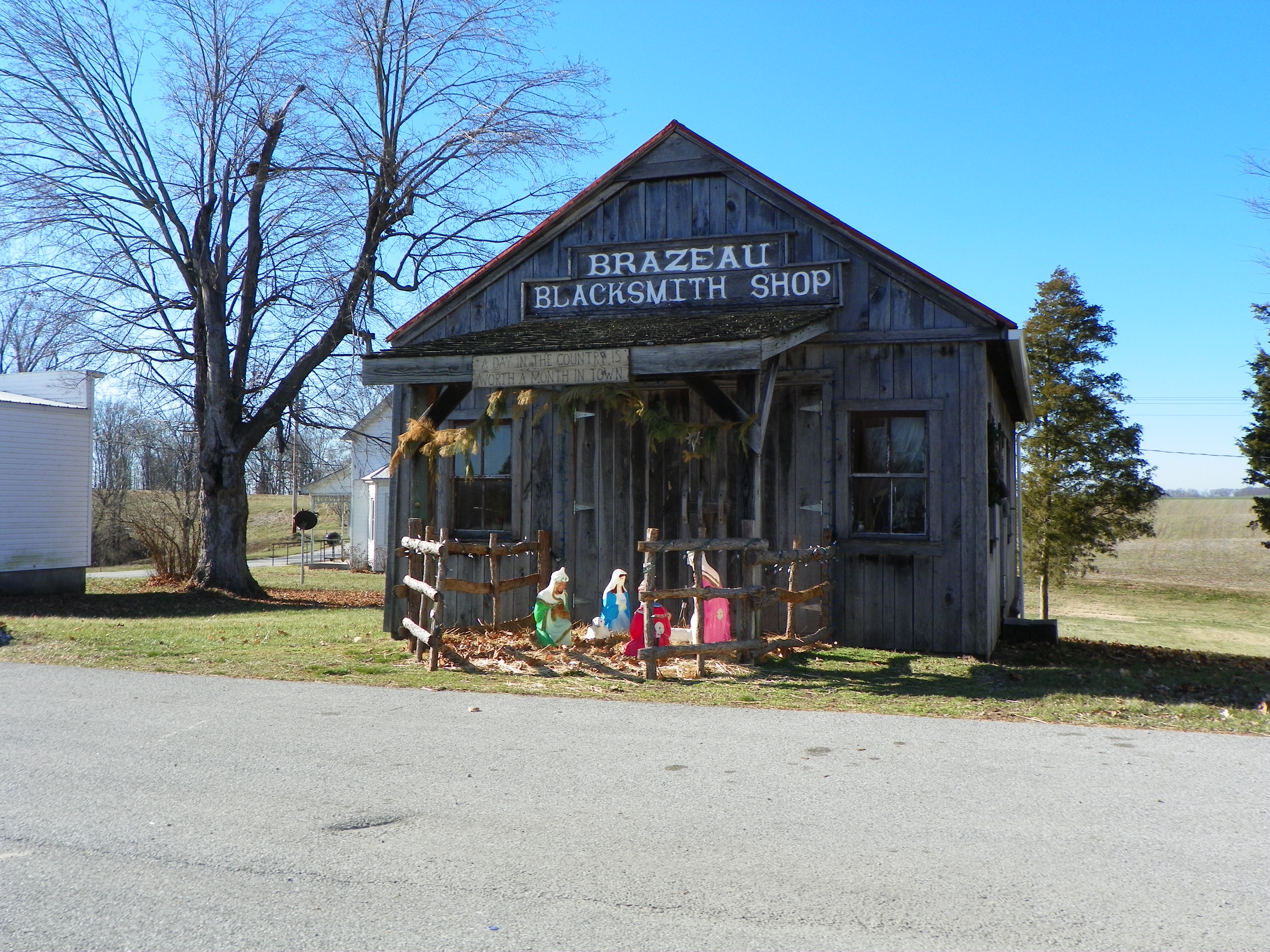
Old Blacksmith shop

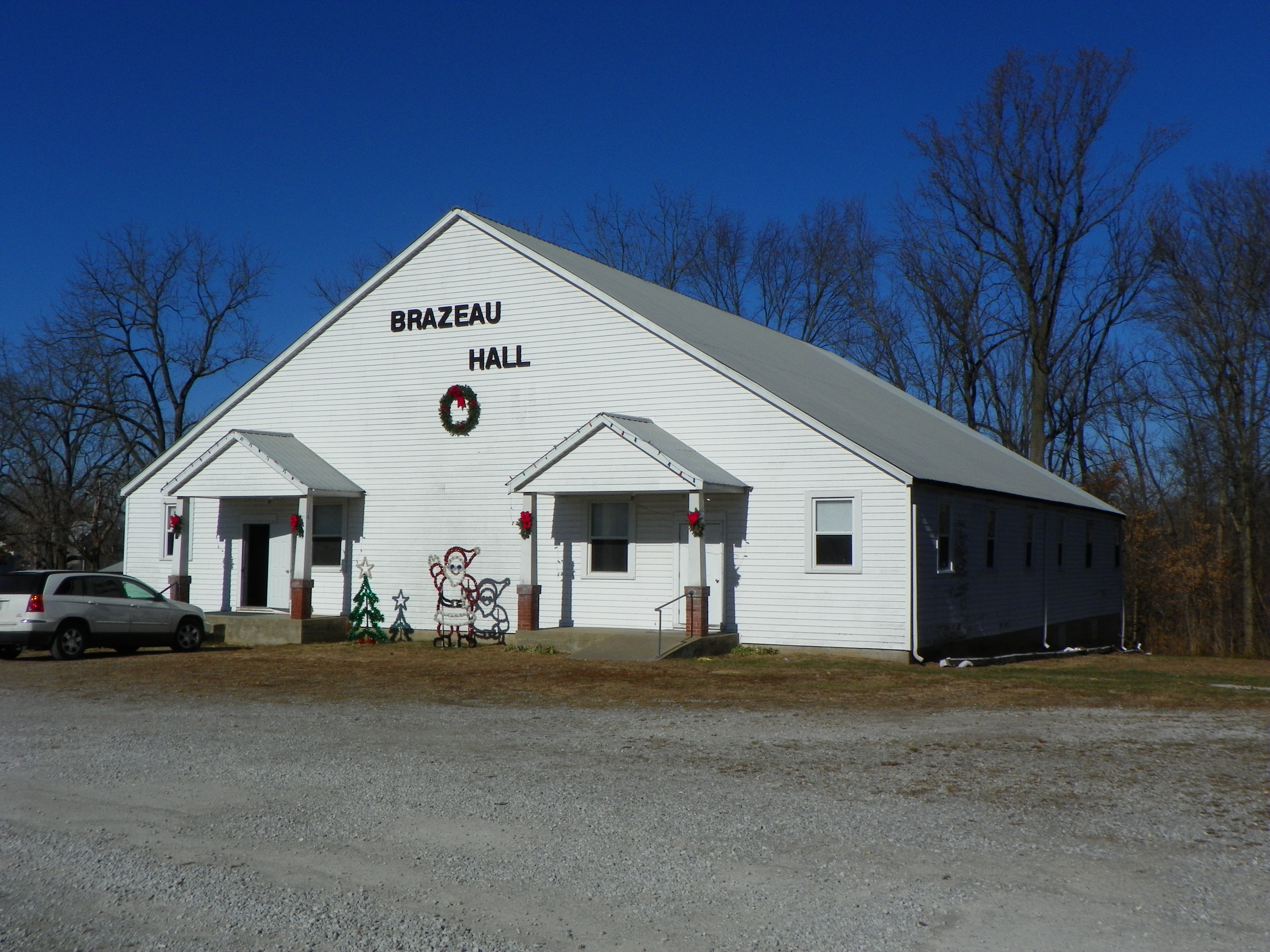
Brazeau Hall
