= Tower Rock =

Rock formation in the Mississippi River

Tower Rock Island
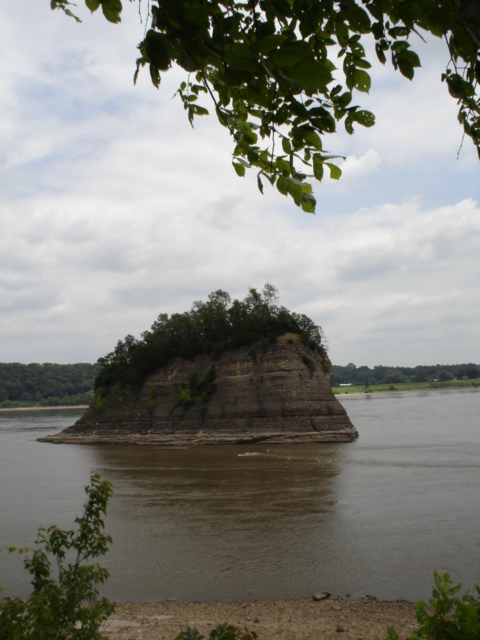
- Interactive map of Tower Rock Island

Geography
- Location: Mississippi River, Brazeau Township, Perry County, Missouri, United States
- Coordinates: 37°37′54″N 89°30′53″W
- Highest elevation: 344 ft (104.9 m)

Administration
- United States
- State: Missouri
- County: Perry

Demographics
- Population: (0)

Additional information
- Official website
- Tower Rock
- U.S. National Register of Historic Places
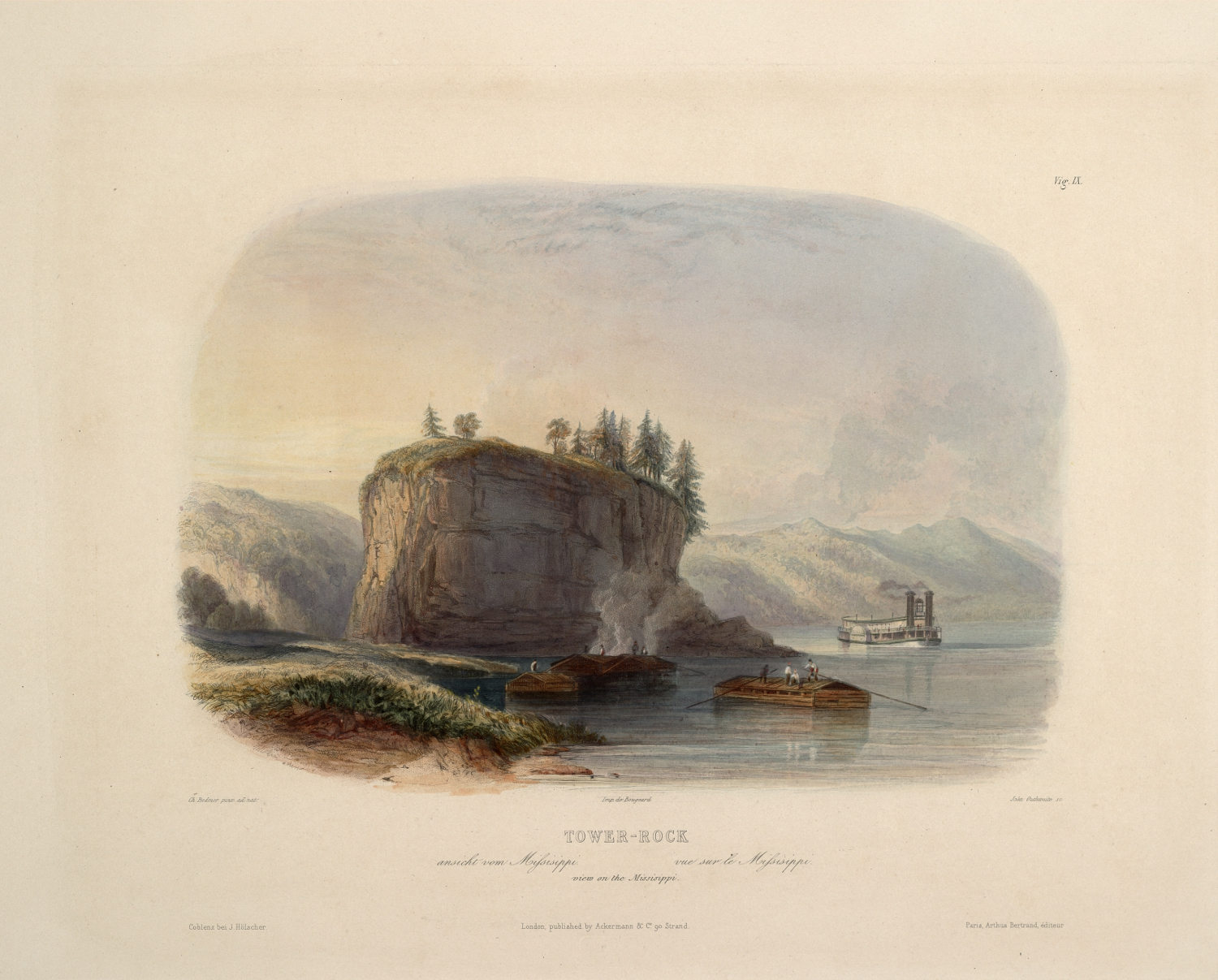
- Tower-Rock, view on the Mississippi (circa 1832): aquatint by Karl Bodmer from the book "Maximilian, Prince of Wied’s Travels in the Interior of North America, during the years 1832–1834"

- Location within Missouri Location within the United States
- Location: Brazeau Township, Perry County, Missouri
- Nearest city: Wittenberg, Missouri
- NRHP reference No.: 70000344
- Added to NRHP: February 26, 1970

Tower Rock, also known as Grand Tower, is a rock formation and landmark island in the Mississippi River, in Brazeau Township, Perry County, Missouri, near the town of Wittenberg, Missouri, and across the river from Grand Tower, Illinois. It was listed on the National Register of Historic Places in 1970.

Tower Rock has also been dubbed with many names over the centuries: Cap de Roche, Cap St. Croix la Tour, La Roche de la Croix, Rock of St. Cosme, Castle Rock, and Devil's Tower.

The earliest mention by Europeans of this island is by French missionary Jacques Marquette in 1673:

...we found ourselves at a river called ouaboukigou, The mouth of which is at the 36th degree of latitude. Before reaching it, we passed by a Place that is dreaded by the Savages, because they believe that a manitou is there, — that is to say, a demon, — that devours travelers; and The savages, who wished to divert us from our undertaking, warned us against it. This is the demon: there is a small cove, surrounded by rocks 20 feet high, into which The whole Current of the river rushes; and, being pushed back against the waters following It, and checked by an Island near by, the Current is Compelled to pass through a narrow Channel. This is not done without a violent Struggle between all these waters, which force one another back, or without a great din, which inspires terror in the savages....

Another early mention of the rock was by French-Canadian seminarian priests, Fathers Montigny, Davion, and St. Cosme, who planted a cross on the rock in 1698.

A ridge directly across the river from the island is named Devil's Backbone.

The earliest European inhabitants on the island were a band of river pirates, who settled here after being driven off Spanish soil west of the Mississippi River, using the location as a pirate ambush spot. This outlaw haven was destroyed in 1803 by the United States Army dragoons, most likely sent from the army post upriver at Fort Kaskaskia.

Meriwether Lewis mentions the island in his journals, stating that rivermen who passed the rock would celebrate in a way similar to sailors crossing the equator, by raising a drink of spirits.

Lutherans from Germany considered this island their Plymouth Rock, because they landed near here after seeking a place where they could practice religious freedom.

Although the rock is normally inaccessible by foot, Mike Keeley, then manager of the 32-acre (13 ha) Tower Rock National Historic Site for the Missouri Department of Conservation, said in 2003 that there is usually a time every year when people can walk out to it due to low water conditions. Due to severe drought in October 2022, it was reported that "you can walk over to Tower Rock and not get your feet wet or muddy".
