= Brazeau Township, Perry County, Missouri =

Township in the US state of Missouri

Brazeau, Missouri
- Civil Township
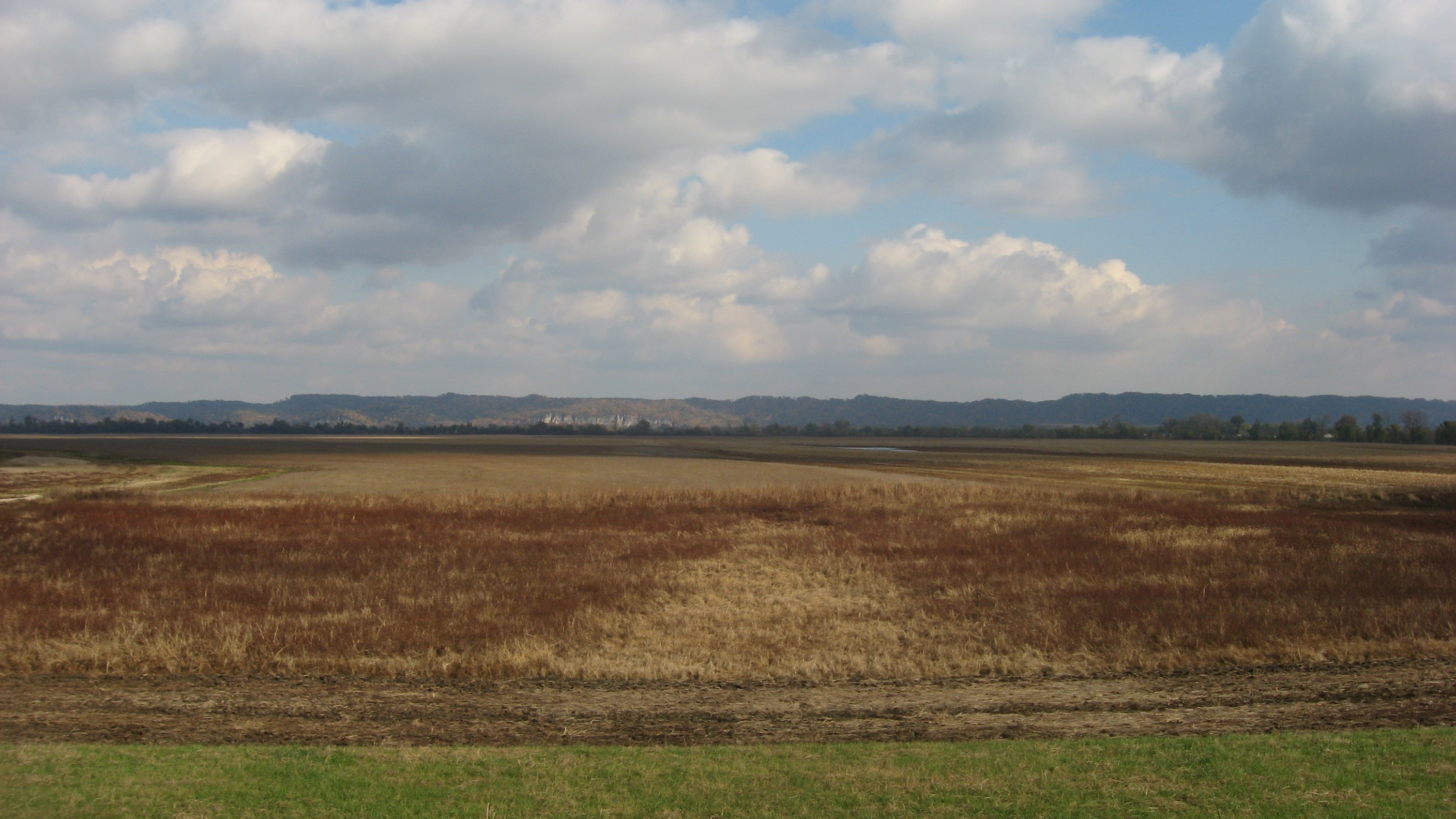
- Fields on Grand Tower Island

- Location of Perry County
- Coordinates: 37°38′28″N 89°34′25″W
- Country: United States
- State: Missouri
- County: Perry

Area
  - Land: 39.7 sq mi (102.7 km^{2})
  - Water: 0.39 sq mi (1.0 km^{2})
- GNIS Feature ID: 767152

Brazeau is one of the eight townships located in Perry County, Missouri, in the United States of America.

== Etymology ==
Brazeau Township is named after Brazeau Creek, which in turn was named for Joseph Brazeau (also spelled Obrazo) a merchant from St. Louis, Missouri in the years 1791–1799, or a member of his family.

== History ==
The earliest settlers to the area of present-day Brazeau Township were French traders and Shawnee Indians who had been granted the right to settle along Apple creek as a buffer against other tribes to the south. The Spanish authorities also granted Catholic American settlers who arrived from Maryland by way of Kentucky the right to settle in the area, establishing a community called the Fenwick Settlement.

The township was organized in 1821, and Brazeau Township was one of the three original townships in Perry County, Missouri, with the other two townships being Bois Brule and Cinque Hommes. Soon thereafter, Protestant English and Scots-Irish settlers arrived from North Carolina. In 1839, German Lutheran immigrants from the Duchy of Saxe-Altenburg arrived and established six "colonies" in the township: Altenburg, Dresden, Frohna, Johannisberg, Seelitz, and Wittenberg. The seventh colony, Paitzdorf (Uniontown, Missouri), lies in Union Township.

== Geography ==
Brazeau Township covers an area of 63.8 square miles (102.7km2) and contains the two incorporated villages of Altenburg and Frohna, as well as the unincorporated villages of Brazeau, Seventy-Six and Wittenberg. Brazeau Bottoms is an alluvial flood plain in the eastern part of the township.

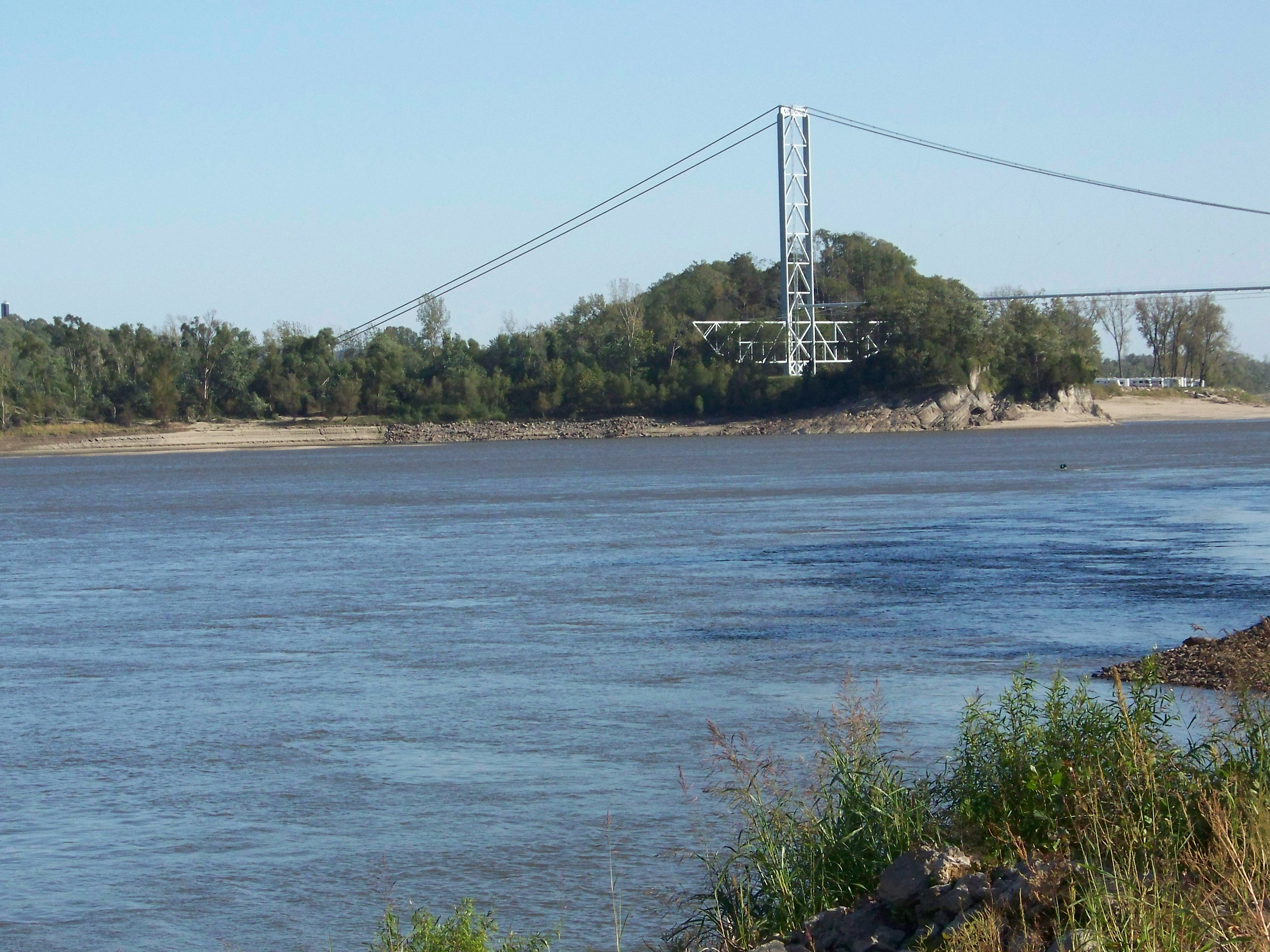
Grand Tower Natural Gas Pipeline Bridge

One part of the township is cut off from the residue. Grand Tower Island lies on the eastern side of the Mississippi River at the township's far eastern end; it is connected by land only to Illinois, and access to the rest of Perry County requires a boat or a drive of more than 30 miles (48 km) to the Chester Bridge at Chester, Illinois to the northwest. The Grand Tower Pipeline Bridge is a natural gas pipeline suspension bridge that carries natural gas from Wittenberg, Missouri to Grand Tower, Illinois.

Tower Rock, a landmark island in the Mississippi River, lies within Brazeau Township.

== Demographics ==
=== 2000 census ===
As of the census of 2000, there were 1,090 people living in the township. The racial makeup of the town was 98.80% White, 0.1% American Indian and Alaska Native, and 0.80% from other races.

=== 2010 census ===
As of the census of 2010, there were 1,100 people living in the township. The population density was 8.9 people per square mile. The racial makeup of the town was 98.80% White, 0.1% American Indian and Alaska Native, and 0.90% from other races.
