= Grand Tower Island =

Island in the Mississippi River in Missouri, U.S.

Coordinates: 37°35′44″N 89°29′47″W

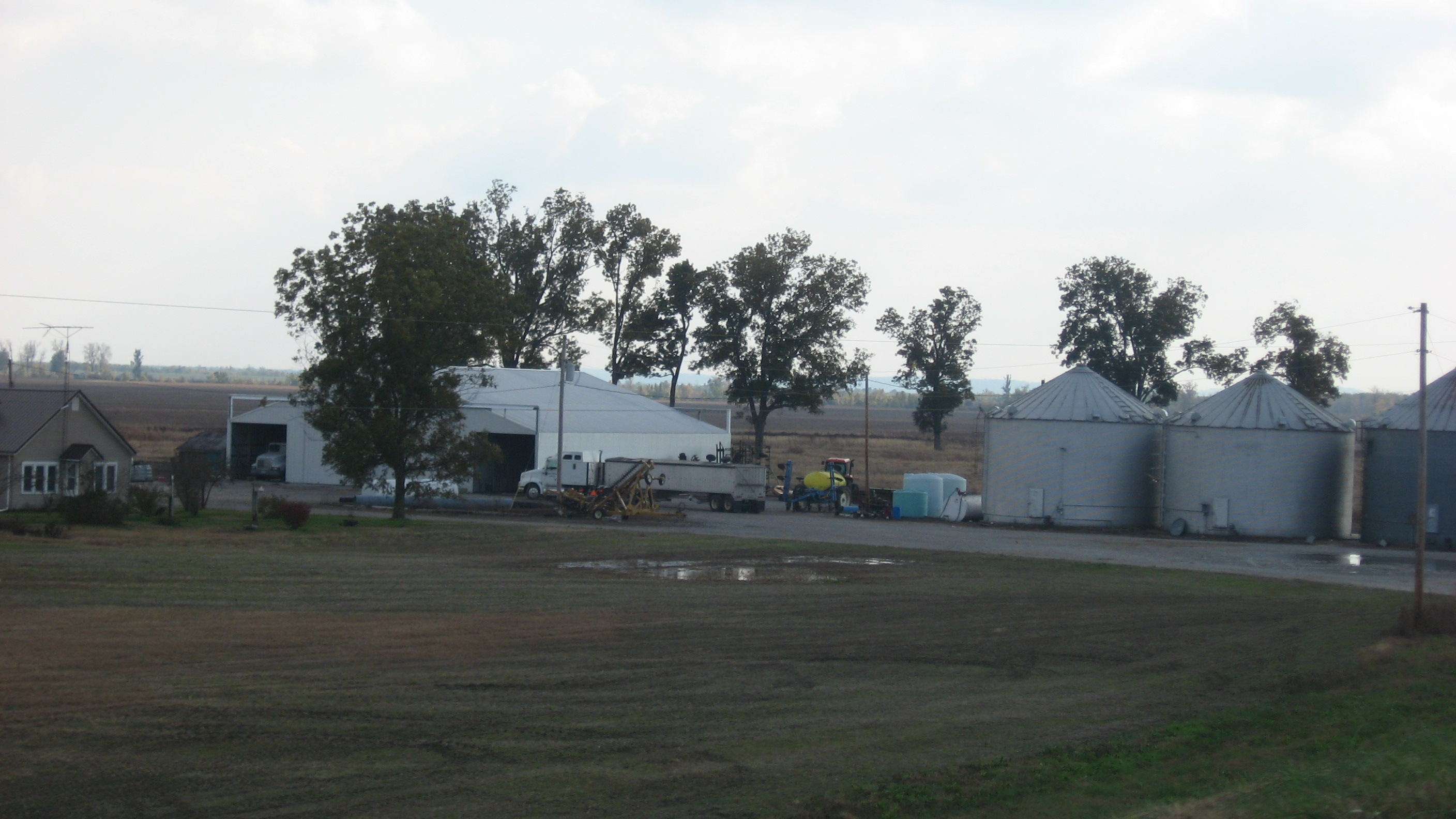
Buildings at the island's only farm

Grand Tower Island is a river island in the Mississippi River in the midwestern United States, within the state of Missouri on its border with the state of Illinois. Formed within recorded history by the movement of the river, it consists of a bulge-shaped piece of land between the river's primary channel and an oxbow lake. Land on the island is generally valuable for farming, especially when protected from flooding, while the lake has developed a reputation as a valuable sport-fishing location.

== Geography ==
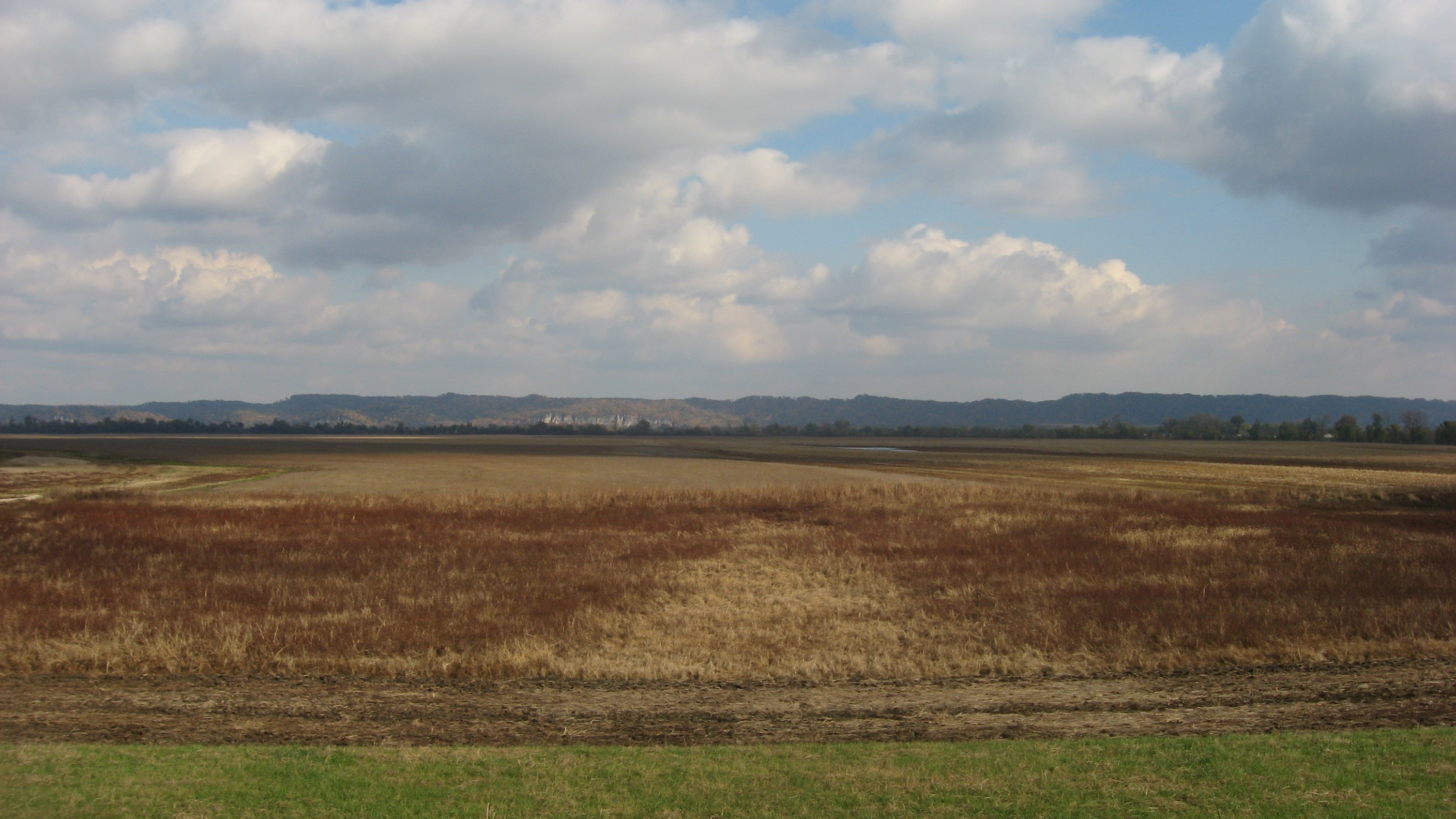
Fields in the island's southern portion

Grand Tower Island lies on the left bank of the Mississippi River in a remote area between St. Louis, Missouri and Cairo, Illinois. It shares its name with the adjacent small city of Grand Tower, Illinois, as well as with the landmark Tower Rock island on the Missouri side of the river. Despite its location on the eastern side of the river and its road connections to Illinois, the island is part of Brazeau Township, Perry County, Missouri, in a situation analogous to the right-bank river village of Kaskaskia, Illinois. A towhead (a narrow island much longer than its width) approximately 1 mile (1.6 km) long lies in the river between Grand Tower Island and the Missouri mainland.

The island's location on the "wrong" side of the Mississippi is the result of a cutoff that formed in recorded history: during the early years of steamboat navigation on the river, the main course flowed through a meander, but the course ultimately shifted and converted the meander into a stagnant oxbow lake. Some parts of the lake are susceptible to disappearing via evaporation, although the lake occasionally reconnects with the river for short periods of time; its water normally trickles into the nearby Big Muddy River, which flows into the Mississippi nearby. Measuring approximately 2 miles (3.2 km) east-west and 2.75 miles (4.43 km) north-south, Grand Tower Island is traversed by a single north-south road, Island Road, that travels south from Grand Tower, crosses the island, turns sharply eastward to run along the narrow strip of land between the lake and the lowest section of the Big Muddy River, and then proceeds southeastward to connect with Illinois Route 3. Road access to the rest of Perry County requires a one-way trip of more than 30 miles (48 km) via the Chester Bridge at Chester.

== Lake and fishing ==
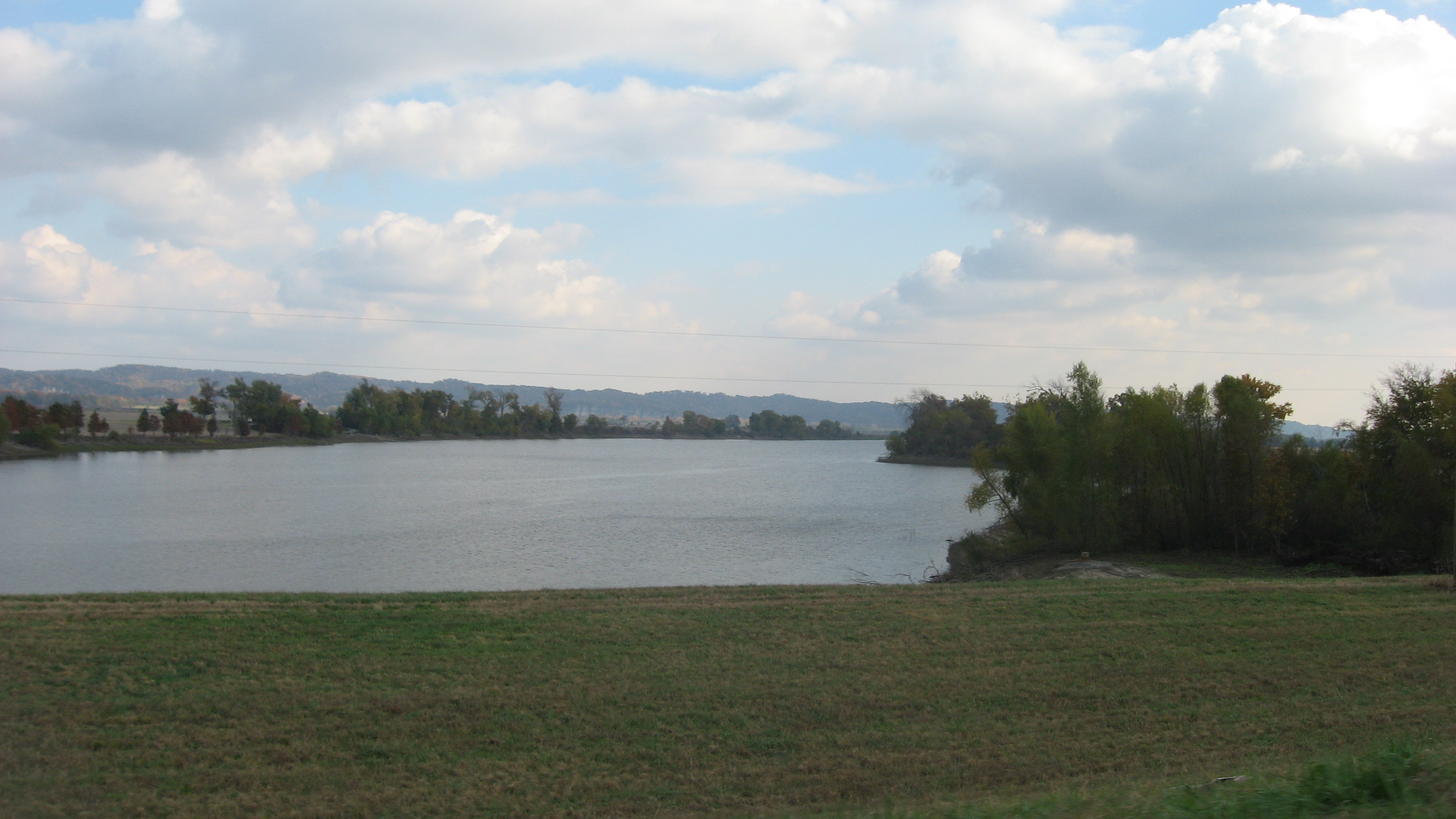
Northern end of the lake

Known alternately as "Tower Island Chute" or as "Grand Tower Chute", the lake is lined by trees along much of its interior shoreline, and as a result, the lake's shores are full of fallen logs and snags — a fine habitat for fish species such as crappie and bass. Reports in the Southeast Missourian during the 1960s highlighted the lake's high population of crappie, even in contrast to populations from Horseshoe Lake to the south, and the lake's carp population is large enough to warrant its inclusion in a carp-fishing contest in the early 2010s. Between 2006 and 2007, researchers from Southern Illinois University in nearby Carbondale studied fish at various locations within and along the Mississippi River from the vicinity of Golden Eagle to Cairo. Among their findings were that the water in Grand Tower Chute had a higher barium-to-calcium ratio than anywhere else except for a portion of the Missouri River, and that fish from the chute had a higher strontium-to-calcium ratio than fish from any other lake in the floodplain and the highest barium-to-calcium ratio of any location.

== Flooding and land use ==
Grand Tower Island is connected to the Illinois mainland by a protective levee, which was built during late 1910 from soil and stones that had recently been dredged from the river's main channel. The portion of the island between the levee and the river measures approximately 900 acres (360 ha); all privately owned, it is primarily forest with some farmland, although some of the area not currently farmed is capable of conversion into farmland, and some of the land is made useless by the presence of factors such as wetlands. Virtually all of the portion of the island behind the levee is used for agriculture, with the sole exception of the thin line of trees responsible for the deadwood that provides the excellent fish habitat. According to a report produced by the Middle Mississippi River Partnership, a federal-state consortium of river-management organizations, most of the land in the island is "prime farmland", with the exceptions of occasional areas that would require drainage to become productive. None of the land behind the levee is frequently subject to flooding.

== See also ==
- Border irregularities of the United States
