= Brazeau Creek =

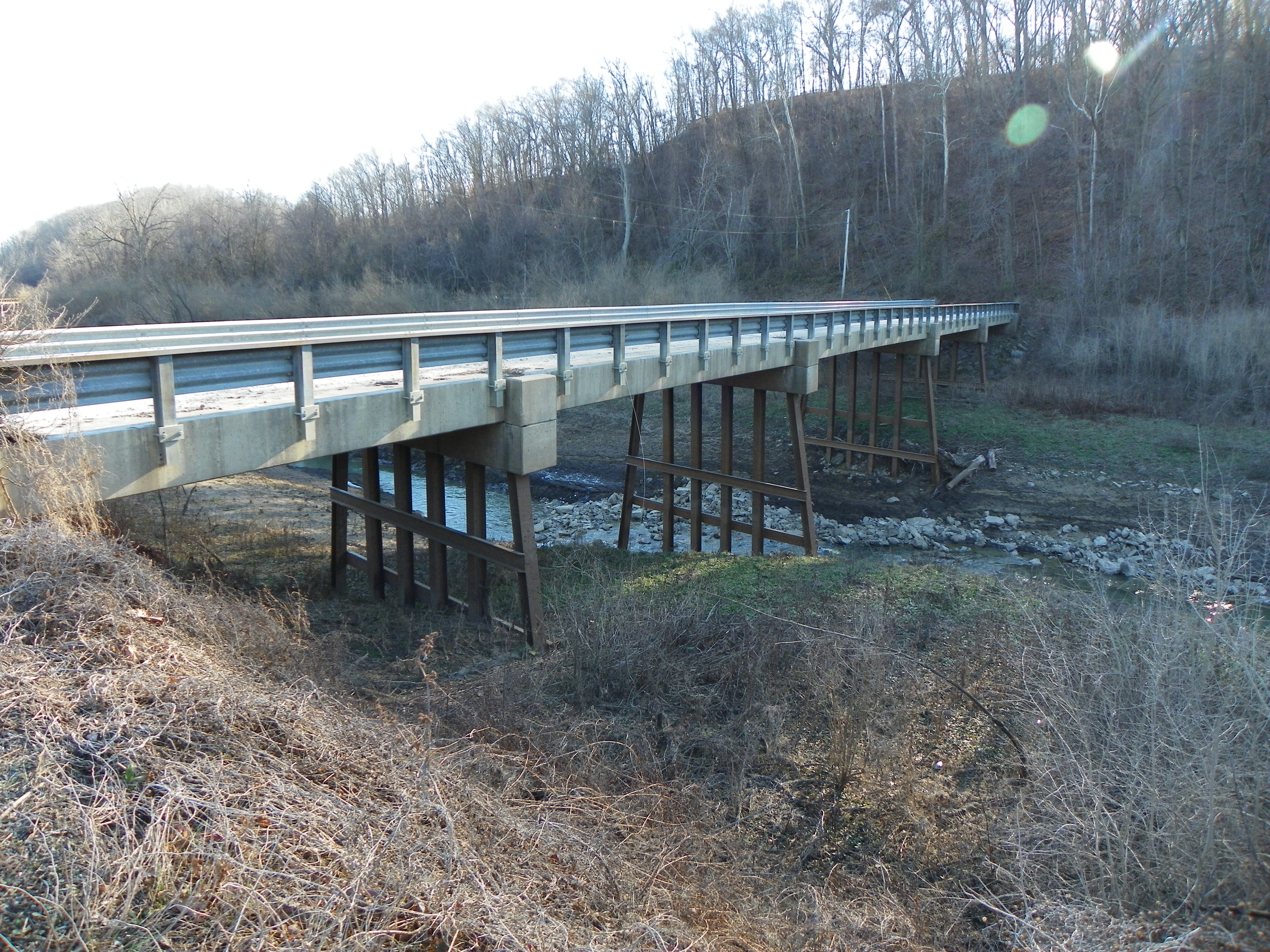
- Bridge over Brazeau Creek
- Etymology: French family name “Au Brazeau” or “Obrazo”

Location
- Country: United States
- State: Missouri

Physical characteristics
- Source
  - location: Perry County, MO
- Mouth: Mississippi River
  - location: Mississippi River, MO
  - coordinates: 37°39′07″N 89°31′15″W
  - elevation: 322 ft (98 m)
- Length: 10.8 mi (17.4 km)
- Basin size: 30 mi^{2} (78 km^{2})

Brazeau Creek is a stream flowing through Perry County, Missouri and emptying into the Mississippi River.

== Name ==
Brazeau Creek was named for Joseph (Jean) Brazeau (also spelled Obrazo) a merchant from St. Louis, Missouri in the years 1791–1799, or a member of his family, who has settled in the Brazeau Bottoms in the Mississippi River floodplains.

== Physical geography ==
Brazeau Creek runs through the northern part of Brazeau Township and empties into the Mississippi River near Wittenberg, Missouri. The stream is 10.3 miles long and its watershed contains an area of 30 sq. miles. A number of tributaries flow into Brazeau Creek:

== Cultural geography ==
A number of bridges have crossed Brazeau Creek over the years. The Brazeau Creek CR 446 Bridge northeast of Altenburg, and Brazeau Creek Route C Bridge, CR 438 Bridge at Wittenberg, and the Wittenberg Railroad Bridge on the Burlington Northern Santa Fe Railway. The town of Brazeau and Brazeau Township were named after the creek.

== History ==
The first Europe settlers on Brazeau Creek was a group of American Catholics. These American Catholics from Kentucky - descended from Irish Roman Catholic families that settled in Maryland - were referred to as “Maryland Catholics” or “English Catholics” to distinguish them from the resident French-speaking Catholics in the area. The reference to Maryland was due to their having left Maryland in 1785 following the American Revolution, and seeking land elsewhere for a better life. The leader of this group, Joseph Fenwick, left New Bourbon village, possibly over issues of land-ownership or to relocate himself beyond easy reach of the colonial officials. He initially planned to settle on Apple Creek at the mouth of Indian Creek, near the villages that the Shawnee were erecting at that time. The presence of so many Indians probably caused Fenwick to give up his plans and instead establish a settlement at the mouth of Brazeau Creek on the Mississippi River. This small settlement was named Fenwick Settlement after its founder. The settlement grew to about 20 families with the arrival of more Catholic families from Kentucky. However, the location of the settlement was not particularly adapt to farming and the settlement did not prosper. By 1807-1808 the Fenwick group began to drift away. The township of Brazeau was organized in 1821, named after Brazeau Creek. Soon after, Protestant English and Scots-Irish settlers arrived from North Carolina. In 1839, German Lutheran immigrants from the Duchy of Saxe-Altenburg arrived and established a number of "colonies" in the vicinity of Brazeau Creek. Brazeau, Missouri was named after the creek.
