= Saxon Lutheran immigration of 1838–39 =

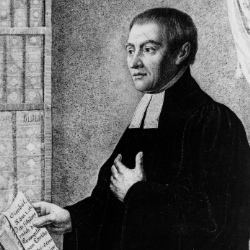
Martin Stephan

The Saxon Lutheran immigration of 1838–39 was a migration of Confessional German Lutherans seeking religious freedom in the United States in the early 19th century. The immigrants were among the original founders of the Lutheran Church – Missouri Synod.

== History ==
=== Background ===
During the middle of the 19th century Confessional Lutheran doctrines like justification by faith were under threat by rationalism. This, together with "unionism" or the merging of various Protestant groups together, drove many German Lutherans to emigrate.

In 1817, Frederick William III of Prussia forced the merging of that country's largest Protestant churches (Lutheran and Reformed) into one single and united Prussian Union of churches. This subsequently led to the persecution and suppression of the confessional beliefs of orthodox Lutherans.

The Evangelical Church of the Prussian Union and the merging of Lutheran and Reformed congregations into a single Church became a model for other German kingdoms. In the Kingdom of Saxony, the State Church – a Lutheran church – was organized as a department of the state with the secular high courts holding authority over ecclesiastical matters. As a result of "Unionism", Lutheran teachings and practices began to be altered by the state. Many Lutheran congregations resisted this forced union by worshipping in secret and many even went so far as crossing into neighboring German states to have their children baptized or to receive communion from an orthodox Lutheran pastor. While persecution of Confessional Lutherans in Prussia was much more severe with police disrupting their congregational meeting places and imprisoning pastors, Confessional Lutherans in Saxony still faced oppressive restrictions.

A confessional Lutheran pastor, Martin Stephan, who originally hailed from Moravia, grew more and more opposed to the new teachings and practices. Stephan eventually developed a plan to emigrate. Stephan's influence and support grew steadily. An important source for his followers was the theological school of University of Leipzig. Several theological students and six pastors turned to Stephan for spiritual leadership. For those following him, the increasing conflict with rationalism and forced unionism of the Lutheran church with the Reformed church made Stephan the champion of Lutheran orthodoxy in the eyes of those following him.

In order to practice their faith freely according to the Book of Concord, Stephan, in 1830, prepared to emigrate to North America. Stephan contacted friends in Baltimore, Maryland, for possible sites of settlement. A final decision to leave the homeland was not made until the spring of 1836, when the first planning meeting took place.

=== Preparation for immigration ===
Stephan grew increasingly impatient with the development of the state church, and he was subsequently arrested at various times in Saxony for holding secret conventicles and was accused of immoral conduct. The controversies and the state's intrusion caused the lay followers of Stephan to outline their "Codes for Emigration".

The planning for emigrating intensified in December 1837. The preliminary plan was organized mainly by Pastor Stephan; his attorney, Adolph Marbach; the secretary, Gustav Jaeckel; H. F. Fischer, a merchant in Dresden who was also Stephan's right-hand man; and Dr. Carl Vehse, the curator of the Saxon State Archive. Financial arrangements were worked out, the planning committee adopted a list of conditions that formed the basis for permission to emigrate, and an "Auswanderungs-Gesellschaft" (emigration society) was formed.

=== Voyage to New Orleans and St. Louis ===
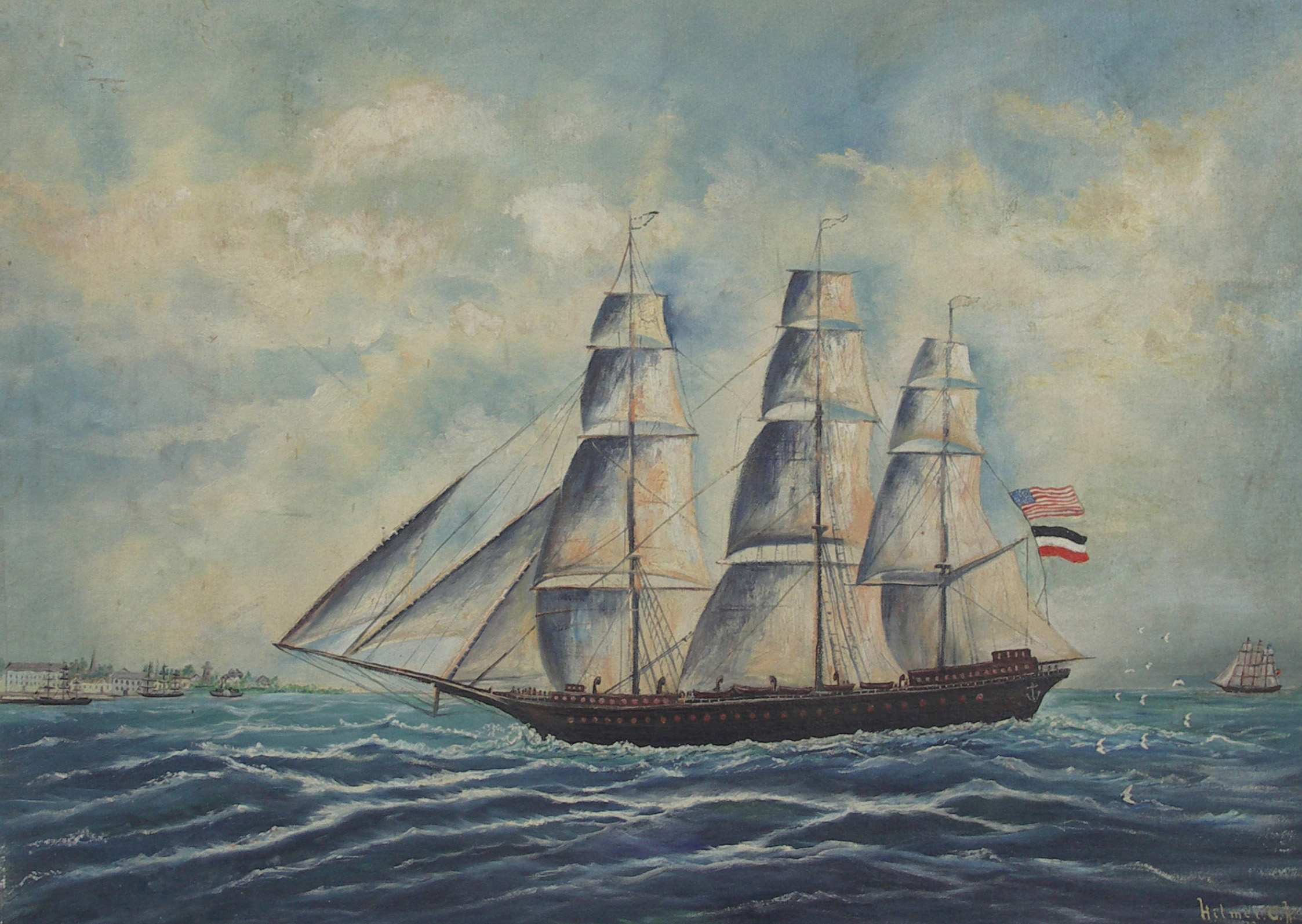
The Johann Georg

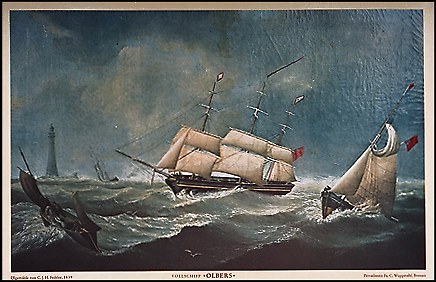
The Olbers

By September 4, 1838, 707 people had enrolled their names to emigrate with the Auswanderungs Gesellschaft. They came from Dresden, Leipzig, Niederfrohna in the Mulde River valley, and from Kahla in the Duchy of Altenburg. A common treasury was established, a fund amounting to 125,000 Thalers. Martin Stephan was 61 years old at the time. Next to him in age were Pastors G. H. Loeber, 41, E. G. W. Keyl about 32, and Carl Ferdinand Wilhelm Walther, 27. Five sailing vessels were chartered and sailed out of Bremen with the members of the group. These ships were named Copernicus, Johann Georg, Republik, Olbers, and Amalia, the last and smallest, which was lost at sea and never heard of again.

The group on the remaining four ships, totaling 602 people, arrived in New Orleans in January 1839, and from there arranged for transport on steamboat up the Mississippi River to St. Louis, Missouri. During that time, the members of the group were asked to sign a document of absolute submission to "our bishop Stephan".

=== Settlement of Perry County ===
The group reached St. Louis and spent only six weeks in that city before departing for their permanent home some 100 miles (160 km) south in Perry County, Missouri. However, 120 members decided to remain in St. Louis, where they founded Trinity Lutheran Church. The main body of the immigrants passed up better land near St. Louis in favor of the location in Perry County where the hilly topography was reminiscent of their homeland.

The Perry County settlers suffered from poverty and their situation was only made worse by financial mismanagement and poorly ordered priorities. More than half of the colonists were forced to camp in tents, booths, or crude cabins. Their belongings, exposed to the weather, spoiled. They were plagued by malaria and scarcity of food. They survived mainly on rice and bacon. These first years were extremely difficult for the colony, as the men were mostly students and professional men unaccustomed to farming and disease.

Despite the hardship and tribulations, the Saxons managed to establish seven small settlements which they named after the communities that they had left behind in Germany, among them Altenburg, Dresden, Frohna, Johannisberg, Paitzdorf, Seelitz, and Wittenberg. They also founded an educational system. A one-room Log Cabin College, Concordia, was erected in 1839 under the leadership of Walther. Classes in 1839 included six languages, math, physics, history, geography, philosophy, religion, music, and drawing.

=== Ousting of Stephan ===
In addition to enduring the physical and economic circumstances, the colony's situation was further complicated by the spiritual chaos brought on by the rejection of Stephan. Stephan's craving for power and his extreme hierarchical views had caused him to miscalculate how far he could go before reaching the breaking point. With his voluptuous living and dictatorial conduct, Stephan not only became brusque and capricious in his handling of people, but he was also accused of sexual misconduct and of mismanaging group funds to satisfy his expensive tastes.

At first C. F. W. Walther kept his knowledge of Stephan's sin secret and only talked about it with some of the other clergy. He attempted to let an unordained ministerial candidate in on the secret by talking in Latin and at night. However, unbeknownst to both of them, a physician who they thought had been sleeping was awake and listening from his bed of straw nearby in the room. Although Walther expected that the other men nearby did not know Latin, he was mistaken. The doctor overheard his conversation and understood it. He told others, and soon many people in the colony knew. When confronted, Walther then talked publicly about Stephan's disgrace.

On May 31, 1839, the colony gathered in Perry County and voted to depose Stephan. He was placed in a boat the next day and rowed across the Mississippi River to Illinois and permanent exile.

=== Uncertainty and renewed purpose ===
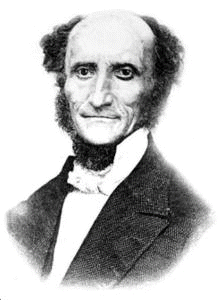
C. F. W. Walther

Stephan's exile left a vacuum which no one was able to come forward and fill. A collective sense of guilt descended on the colony concerning the justifiability of the migration, the correctness or error in Stephanism, the nature of the church and ministry. The pastors became despondent, wondering whether they were a church or a mob or even if they were still Christians. It was suggested by some that a public confession of sin be made followed by a return of the entire group to Germany. In late March, as the colony drifted towards disintegration, Walther emerged with a series of propositions that were to prove fundamental in saving the colonies.

On April 15 and 21, 1841, a public debate between F. A. Marbach and Walther in Altenburg was a turning point in the development of the colony. Marbach argued that the entire church polity rested on an indefinite, unclear, and insecure foundation. He doubted that their local congregation was a true Christian church or that their ministry served the will of God. Walther replied that in spite of lingering Stephanistic errors the word of God was present. There were still Christians among them, so the church was represented in their midst. It was Walther who stepped forth to guide and direct the successful establishment of colony. The colony voted in favor of Walter's vision and remained in Perry County.

== Descendants ==
Descendants of the immigrants continue to live in Perry County, although many have moved to larger cities for employment. In 2014, 247 residents of the county continued to speak a distinct Upper Saxon dialect of German, although that number is decreasing, with the youngest speakers being over 50 years of age.

== See also ==
- Saxon Lutheran Memorial (Frohna, Missouri)
