= Perry County, Missouri =

County in Missouri, United States

- County
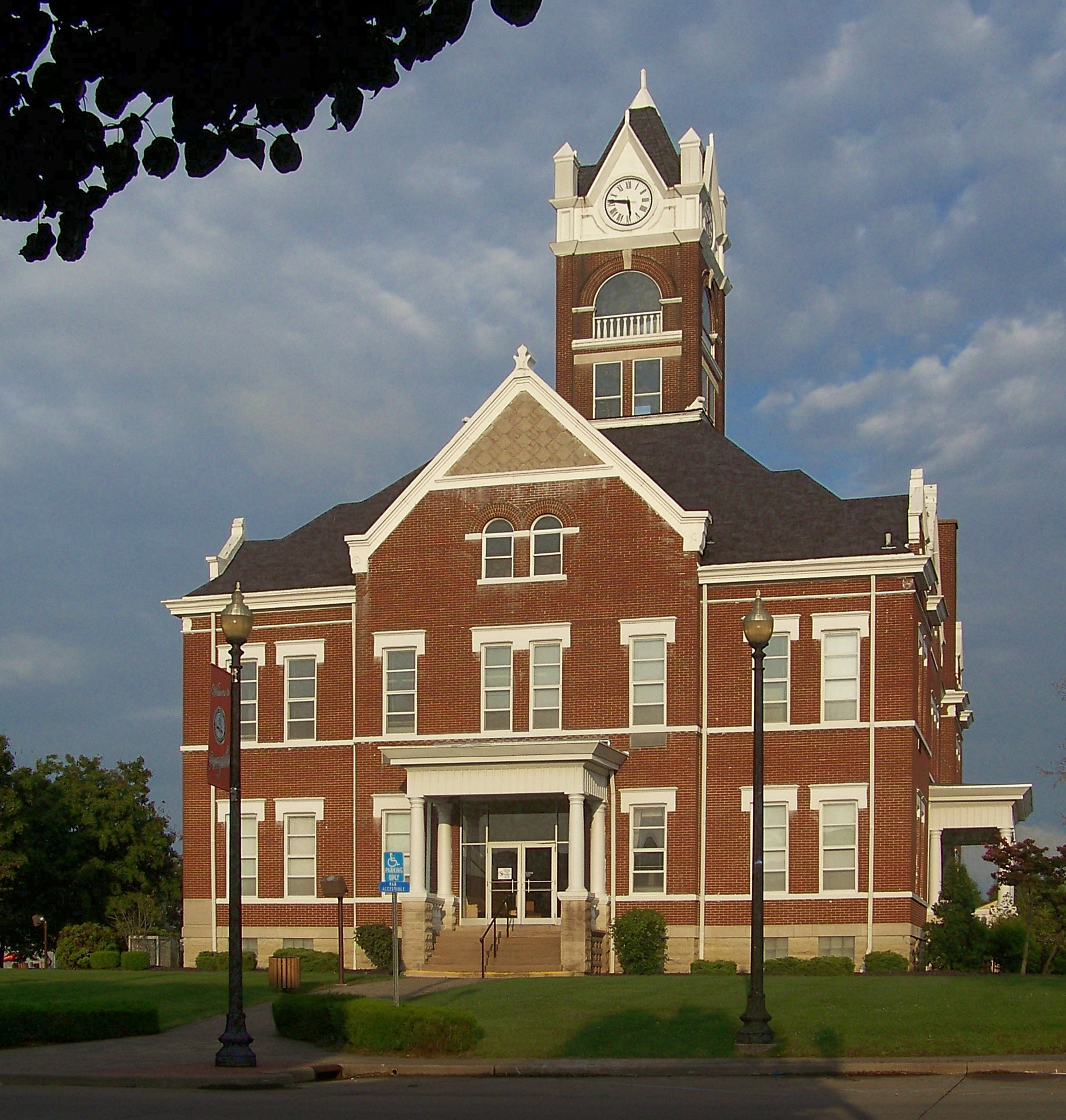
- Perry County courthouse in Perryville

- Location within the U.S. state of Missouri
- Coordinates: 37°43′N 89°50′W
- Country: United States
- State: Missouri
- Founded: November 16, 1820
- Named for: Oliver Hazard Perry
- Seat: Perryville
- Largest city: Perryville

Area
  - Total: 484 sq mi (1,250 km^{2})
  - Land: 474 sq mi (1,230 km^{2})
  - Water: 9.8 sq mi (25 km^{2}) 2.0%

Population (2020)
  - Total: 18,956
  - Estimate (2025): 19,093 ▲
  - Density: 40.0/sq mi (15.4/km^{2})
- Time zone: UTC−6 (Central)
  - Summer (DST): UTC−5 (CDT)
- Congressional district: 8th
- Website: perrycountymo.us

Perry County is a county located in the southeastern portion of the U.S. state of Missouri. As of the 2020 census, the population was 18,956. Its county seat is Perryville. The county was officially organized on November 16, 1820 (effective January 1, 1821) from Ste. Genevieve County and was named after Oliver Hazard Perry, a naval hero of the War of 1812.

== History ==
=== Early Native Americans ===
The first inhabitants of what is now Perry County were Mississippian Mound Builders who cultivated corn and constructed earthen mounds. The Mississippian cultures inhabited the region until their decline in the 12th and 13th centuries. Remnants of their earthen mounds can be found in the eastern part of the county. By the time of European contact, the area was populated by Native Americans of the Illinois Confederation who inhabited much of eastern Missouri.

=== French and Spanish rule ===
During the 18th Century, the Perry County area, like the rest of the future State of Missouri, was part of French Louisiana, also known as the Illinois Country. For most of the 18th Century the area of present-day Perry County was left largely uninhabited, even by the French of nearby Ste. Genevieve. The latter was the first permanent White settlement in the Missouri area. In 1764, when the terms of the 1763 Treaty of Paris were announced in Louisiana, the French settlers found themselves transferred to an alien domination, that of Spain. In general the French were unhappy with the change of rule and the Spanish governance of the territory was an uneasy one, occasionally punctuated by armed rebellion. In the Ste. Genevieve area, the Spaniards, making a virtue of necessity, tended to let the French govern themselves. During the 1770s and 1780s members of the Peoria Tribe, whose situation had deteriorated under British and American rule in Illinois, migrated west across the Mississippi River into Ste. Genevieve and the lower part of the Bois Brule Bottoms.

The French population suffered continued harassment by the Osage to the southwest. In the 1790s, Louis Lorimier, authorized by Spanish officials, invited the Shawnee and Delaware tribes in Ohio to immigrate and settle along Apple Creek in Perry County in the hope that they would act as a buffer between the French to the north and the Osage to the south. Their largest village, Le Grand Village Sauvage - with a population of some 400, was located in the southern part of the county, just above Apple Creek, near present-day Old Appleton. Within a decade of the Native American immigration, Spanish authorities showed an interest in opening the area to colonization by Americans. The first French settlers were Jean Baptiste Barsaloux and his father Girard Barsaloux who lived in the Bois Brule Bottom in 1787.

=== American settlement ===
The first American settlers to Perry County arrived during the latter half of the 1790s and claimed rich land in Bois Brule Bottom. These Americans organized the region's original Baptist Church in 1807. In the early 19th century, a second group of American settlers crossed the Mississippi River to take advantage of Spanish land offers. These were Roman Catholics of English stock from north-central Kentucky. They had originally come from Maryland to escape religious discrimination and prided themselves on being descendants of Lord Baltimore's original colonists. The first of these to settle permanently in the future Perry County was Isidore Moore. He arrived in 1801 and became a patriarch of the area, and founded Tucker's Settlement. Others soon followed whose family names predominated the decades: Tucker, Fenwick, Cissell, Hayton, Riney, Hamilton, Layton, Manning, and Hagan. Most of these settled in the uplands around Perryville in a place called the Barrens because of its open land. Another Maryland Catholic, Joseph Fenwick, established the short-lived Fenwick Settlement at the mouth of Brazeau Creek in the Brazeau Bottoms.

When the region was transferred to American sovereignty in 1803–1804, the Barrens became part of the Louisiana Territory. Prior to the admission of Missouri to statehood in 1821, several new migrations altered the religious composition of the future county. In 1817, a large group of Presbyterians from North Carolina settled in the neighborhood of Brazeau, an area roughly bounded by the Mississippi River and the Cinque Hommes Creek and Apple Creek. These settlers organized a church in 1819. They were soon followed by Methodists from the same state whose family names live on, like Abernathy, Farrar, and Rutledge. In 1826, they built their first log meeting house, which was later replaced by York Chapel.

Until 1821, the Barrens region formed the southern portion of Ste. Genevieve County. When Missouri was granted statehood, Perry County was organized out of the parent district. It was divided into three townships: Brazeau, Cinque Hommes, and Bois Brule. Their boundaries, following natural geographical features, were quite irregular. In 1856, the borders were made symmetrical and two new townships, St. Mary's and Saline, were added.

After 1821, the descendants of French colonial families from Ste. Genevieve trickled into Perry County, and in the middle of the next decade, their ranks swelled by immigrants from France itself. They settled on the lands that were near the present city of Perryville. At about the same time, a small group of Flemings settled in the northeastern part of the county, with the present town of Belgique as their center. There were also Swiss in the same area.

=== German immigration ===
The late 1830s saw the beginnings of a heavy German immigration that would permanently alter the ethnic balance of the county. In the fall of 1838, more than 600 Saxon Lutherans, under the leadership of Pastor Martin Stephan, uprooted themselves and migrated to Missouri in what is called The Saxon Lutheran Migration, seeking to avoid the enforced religious conformity brought about by the Prussian Union of churches. They settled in the southeastern corner of the county and moved inland through a series of towns whose names enshrined both religion and nationality: Wittenberg, Friedheim, Frohna, Dresden, Altenburg, and Paitzdorf, which was renamed Uniontown during the American Civil War. Much of the legacy of the German immigration lives on today through the Lutheran Church–Missouri Synod. A distinct Saxon dialect of German continues to be spoken by about 250 residents (in 2014), although that number is declining with the youngest speakers being over 50 years old.

Others who settled in the area were German Catholics, mostly from Bavaria and Baden. They settled in the Barrens area. The Lutherans and Presbyterians established churches in the region bounded by the 1856 Township of Brazeau. The Methodists located farther west in the area that comprised the 1856 township of Cinque Hommes. There they set up two churches, the first York Chapel, near present-day Longtown, about 5 miles (8 km) southeast of Perryville, and in 1836 a second in Perryville itself. Then in 1844–1845, they divided between north and south over the question of whether a bishop could own slaves. The two Methodist churches in Perry County parted company, the city congregation going with the North and the York Chapel siding with the South. The Baptists of the county tended to congregate in both Bois Brule Bottom and in the area of Saline Township. In the first decades of the 19th century, they met in private homes.

Enslaved population in 1860 was 8.6% according to a census map. Ordered by President Abraham Lincoln, this map shows this population by county, and was sold to benefit the Union Army in the American Civil War.

While it is one of the oldest communities in Missouri, Perry County also founded the first college west of the Mississippi River, dating to 1827.

== Geography ==
Shaped like a camel's hump, Perry County consists of 471 square miles (1,200 km^{2}) that fit neatly into a wedge created by the confluence of Apple Creek and the Mississippi River. Topographically, it is divided into lowlands and uplands. The lowlands comprise about one-eighth of the county and lie for the most part along the river. In the northeastern corner is the Bois Brule Bottom, meaning Burnt Wood, the most extensive tract of lowland, approximately 15 miles (24 km) long and up to 5 miles (8 km) wide. Its rich soil, coupled with its size, makes it the most productive farmland in the county. Smaller in size but still important is the Brazeau Bottom on the Mississippi River below Cape Cinque Hommes and the bottom situated near the mouth of Apple Creek.

The Uplands constitutes the largest part of the county and its topography varies greatly. The best parts of it are in the central area where the soil is generally good and the terrain nearly level or gently rolling. Rolling uplands surround this central section and are bounded by the Saline Hills to the west and the Mississippi River Hills and Bluffs to the east and northeast.

According to the U.S. Census Bureau, the county has a total area of 484 square miles (1,250 km^{2}), of which 474 square miles (1,230 km^{2}) is land and 9.8 square miles (25 km^{2}) (2.0%) is water. It is located across the Mississippi River from Illinois.

=== Adjacent counties ===
- Randolph County, Illinois (north)
- Jackson County, Illinois (northeast)
- Union County, Illinois (east)
- Cape Girardeau County (southeast)
- Bollinger County (southwest)
- Madison County (southwest)
- St. Francois County (northwest)
- Ste. Genevieve County (northwest)

=== Major highways ===
- Interstate 55
- U.S. Route 61
- Route 51

=== National protected area ===
- Middle Mississippi River National Wildlife Refuge (part)

== Demographics ==
Historical population
Census	Pop.	Note	%±
1830	3,349		—
1840	5,760		72.0%
1850	7,215		25.3%
1860	9,128		26.5%
1870	9,877		8.2%
1880	11,895		20.4%
1890	13,237		11.3%
1900	15,134		14.3%
1910	14,898		−1.6%
1920	14,434		−3.1%
1930	13,707		−5.0%
1940	15,358		12.0%
1950	14,890		−3.0%
1960	14,642		−1.7%
1970	14,393		−1.7%
1980	16,784		16.6%
1990	16,648		−0.8%
2000	18,132		8.9%
2010	18,971		4.6%
2020	18,956		−0.1%
2025 (est.)	19,093	▲	0.7%
U.S. Decennial Census; 1790-1960 1900-1990; 1990-2000 2010-2015 2020

=== 2020 Census ===
As of the 2020 census, the county had a population of 18,956. The median age was 42.1 years. 23.1% of residents were under the age of 18 and 19.8% of residents were 65 years of age or older. For every 100 females there were 100.9 males, and for every 100 females age 18 and over there were 100.1 males age 18 and over.

The racial makeup of the county was 93.6% White, 0.5% Black or African American, 0.2% American Indian and Alaska Native, 0.6% Asian, 0.0% Native Hawaiian and Pacific Islander, 1.0% from some other race, and 4.0% from two or more races. Hispanic or Latino residents of any race comprised 2.0% of the population.

42.5% of residents lived in urban areas, while 57.5% lived in rural areas.

There were 7,560 households in the county, of which 29.9% had children under the age of 18 living with them and 21.2% had a female householder with no spouse or partner present. About 26.9% of all households were made up of individuals and 12.6% had someone living alone who was 65 years of age or older.

There were 8,464 housing units, of which 10.7% were vacant. Among occupied housing units, 75.5% were owner-occupied and 24.5% were renter-occupied. The homeowner vacancy rate was 1.4% and the rental vacancy rate was 8.4%.

Perry County, Missouri – Racial and ethnic composition Note: the US Census treats Hispanic/Latino as an ethnic category. This table excludes Latinos from the racial categories and assigns them to a separate category. Hispanics/Latinos may be of any race.
Race / Ethnicity (NH = Non-Hispanic)	Pop 1980	Pop 1990	Pop 2000	Pop 2010	Pop 2020	% 1980	% 1990	% 2000	% 2010	% 2020
White alone (NH)	16,648	16,467	17,739	18,299	17,657	99.19%	98.91%	97.83%	96.46%	93.15%
Black or African American alone (NH)	21	11	33	70	102	0.13%	0.07%	0.18%	0.37%	0.54%
Native American or Alaska Native alone (NH)	5	29	42	45	29	0.03%	0.17%	0.23%	0.24%	0.15%
Asian alone (NH)	47	68	117	85	123	0.28%	0.41%	0.65%	0.45%	0.65%
Native Hawaiian or Pacific Islander alone (NH)	x	x	5	1	0	x	x	0.03%	0.01%	0.00%
Other race alone (NH)	8	1	2	1	20	0.05%	0.01%	0.01%	0.01%	0.11%
Mixed race or Multiracial (NH)	x	x	101	152	642	x	x	0.56%	0.80%	3.39%
Hispanic or Latino (any race)	55	72	93	318	383	0.33%	0.43%	0.51%	1.68%	2.02%
Total	16,784	16,648	18,132	18,971	18,956	100.00%	100.00%	100.00%	100.00%	100.00%

=== 2000 census ===
As of the 2000 census, there were 18,132 people, 6,904 households, and 4,957 families residing in the county. The population density was 38 people per square mile (15 people/km^{2}). There were 7,815 housing units at an average density of 16 units per square mile (6.2/km^{2}). The racial makeup of the county was 98.21% White, 0.18% Black or African American, 0.23% Native American, 0.65% Asian, 0.03% Pacific Islander, 0.12% from other races, and 0.58% from two or more races. Approximately 0.51% of the population were Hispanic or Latino of any race.

There were 6,904 households, out of which 34.20% had children under the age of 18 living with them, 60.50% were married couples living together, 7.90% had a female householder with no husband present, and 28.20% were non-families. 24.50% of all households were made up of individuals, and 11.60% had someone living alone who was 65 years of age or older. The average household size was 2.57 and the average family size was 3.07.

In the county, the population was spread out, with 26.00% under the age of 18, 8.60% from 18 to 24, 27.90% from 25 to 44, 21.90% from 45 to 64, and 15.70% who were 65 years of age or older. The median age was 37 years. For every 100 females there were 99.20 males. For every 100 females age 18 and over, there were 97.50 males.

The median income for a household in the county was $44,264, and the median income for a family was $53,034. Males had a median income of $28,337 versus $19,720 for females. The per capita income for the county was $20,066. About 5.20% of families and 9.00% of the population were below the poverty line, including 8.90% of those under age 18 and 13.20% of those age 65 or over.

=== Religion ===
Unlike many rural counties in southeastern Missouri, Perry County is an exception to the Bible Belt, with Roman Catholicism being the majority religion, according to the Association of Religion Data Archives County Membership Report (2000). Among residents in Perry County who adhere to a religion, 60.33% are Roman Catholics, 29.72% are Lutherans, and 4.94% are Southern Baptists.

Perry County has the second highest percentage of Catholics of any county in the state of Missouri behind only Osage County, Missouri. Perry County also has the second highest percentage of Lutherans of any county in the state of Missouri behind only Atchison County, Missouri.

Roman Catholic churches

- Nativity of the Blessed Virgin Mary (Belgique)
- Old St. Boniface (Perryville)
- St. James (Crosstown)
- St. John the Evangelist (Lithium)
- St. Joseph (Apple Creek)
- St. Mary's of the Barrens (Perryville)
- St. Maurus (Biehle)
- St. Rose of Lima Mission (Silver Lake)
- St. Vincent de Paul (Perryville)

Lutheran churches

- Concordia (Frohna)
- Grace (Uniontown)
- Immanuel (Perryville)
- Peace (Friedenberg)
- Salem (Farrar)
- Zion (Crosstown)
- Zion (Longtown)

Presbyterian churches

- Brazeau Presbyterian (Brazeau)
- First Presbyterian (Perryville)

Methodist churches

- York Chapel (Longtown)
- United Methodist Church Perryville

Baptist churches

- Bethlehem (Crosstown)
- Lithium Baptist (Lithium)

== Politics ==
=== Local ===
The Republican Party predominantly controls politics at the local level in Perry County. Republicans hold all of the elected positions in the county.

Perry County, Missouri

Elected countywide officials
Assessor	Charles Triller	Republican
Circuit Clerk	Jennifer Hotop	Republican
County Clerk	Jared Kutz	Republican
Collector	Rodney J. Richardet	Republican
Commissioner (presiding)	Mike Sauer	Republican
Commissioner (district 1)	Jay Wengert	Republican
Commissioner (district 2)	Keith Hoehn	Republican
Coroner	William "Bill" Bohnert	Republican
Prosecuting Attorney	Caitlin Pistorio	Republican
Public Administrator	Tamara M. Tarrillion	Republican
Recorder	Dana Pritchard	Republican
Sheriff	Jason Klaus	Republican
Surveyor	Tim Baer	Republican
Treasurer	Katie Schemel	Republican

=== State ===
Perry County is divided into two districts in the Missouri House of Representatives, both of which are held by Republicans.

- District 116 - Currently represented by Dale Wright (politician) (R-Farmington) and includes North of the city of Perryville as well as some area east and west of the city. Wright has represented the district since 2018.

Missouri House of Representatives – District 116 – Perry County (2020)
Party	Candidate	Votes	%	±%
Republican	Dale Wright	2,592	99.35%	

Missouri House of Representatives – District 116 – Perry County (2018)
Party	Candidate	Votes	%	±%
Republican	Dale Wright	1,759	75.40%	
Democratic	Bill Kramer	575	24.60%	

Missouri House of Representatives – District 116 – Perry County (2016)
Party	Candidate	Votes	%	±%
Republican	Kevin Engler	2,330	99.32%	

Missouri House of Representatives – District 116 – Perry County (2014)
Party	Candidate	Votes	%	±%
Republican	Kevin Engler	1,288	99.31%	

Missouri House of Representatives – District 116 – Perry County (2012)
Party	Candidate	Votes	%	±%
Republican	Kevin Engler	2,107	99.25%	

- District 145 - Currently represented by Rick Francis (R-Perryville, Missouri) and includes the rest of Perry County (Altenburg, Biehle, Frohna, Longtown).

Missouri House of Representatives – District 145 – Perry County (2020)
Party	Candidate	Votes	%	±%
Republican	Rick Francis	5,201	84.98%	
Democratic	Mike Lindley	916	14.97%	

Missouri House of Representatives – District 145 – Perry County (2018)
Party	Candidate	Votes	%	±%
Republican	Rick Francis	3,929	83.0%	
Democratic	Ronald Pember	807	17.0%	

Missouri House of Representatives – District 145 – Perry County (2016)
Party	Candidate	Votes	%	±%
Republican	Rick Francis	4,509	80.75%	
Democratic	Ronald Pember	869	15.57%	
Independent	Victoria (Tori) Proffer	199	3.56%	

Missouri House of Representatives – District 145 – Perry County (2014)
Party	Candidate	Votes	%	±%
Republican	Shelly (White) Keeney	2,451	79.04%	
Democratic	Charles Elrod	645	20.807%	

Missouri House of Representatives – District 145 – Perry County (2012)
Party	Candidate	Votes	%	±%
Republican	Shelly (White) Keeney	4,131	99.30%	

All of Perry County is a part of Missouri's 27th District in the Missouri Senate and is currently represented by State Senator Holly Rehder (R-Scott City). The 27th Senatorial District consists of Bollinger, Cape Girardeau, Madison, Mississippi, Perry, and Scott counties.

Missouri Senate – District 27 – Perry County (2020)
Party	Candidate	Votes	%	±%
Republican	Holly Rehder	7,379	81.57%	
Democratic	Donnie Owens	1,663	18.38%	

Missouri Senate – District 27 – Perry County (2016)
Party	Candidate	Votes	%	±%
Republican	Wayne Wallingford	6,233	77.59%	
Democratic	Donnie Owens	1,791	22.30%	

Missouri Senate – District 27 – Perry County (2012)
Party	Candidate	Votes	%	±%
Republican	Wayne Wallingford	6,397	98.98%	

Missouri Senate – District 27 – Perry County (2008)
Party	Candidate	Votes	%	±%
Republican	Jason Crowell	5,506	68.79%	
Democratic	Linda Sanders	2,496	31.18%	

Past gubernatorial election results
Year	Republican	Democratic	Third Parties
2024	82.46% 7,847	15.77% 1,501	1.77% 168
2020	81.12% 7,595	17.41% 1,630	1.45% 136
2016	66.39% 5,725	30.89% 2,664	2.65% 229
2012	51.57% 4,057	46.36% 3,647	2.07% 163
2008	51.85% 4,391	46.24% 3,916	1.90% 161
2004	64.57% 5,293	34.43% 2,822	1.00% 82
2000	65.33% 4,735	33.37% 2,419	1.30% 94
1996	48.94% 3,307	49.62% 3,353	1.44% 97
1992	56.65% 4,020	43.35% 3,076	0.00% 0
1988	74.11% 4,459	25.49% 1,534	0.40% 24
1984	68.20% 4,309	31.80% 2,009	0.00% 0
1980	56.14% 4,333	43.81% 3,381	0.05% 4
1976	64.46% 4,416	35.44% 2,428	0.10% 7

=== Federal ===
Perry County is included in Missouri's 8th Congressional District and is currently represented by Jason T. Smith (R-Salem) in the U.S. House of Representatives. Smith won a special election on Tuesday, June 4, 2013, to finish out the remaining term of U.S. Representative Jo Ann Emerson (R-Cape Girardeau). Emerson announced her resignation a month after being reelected with over 70 percent of the vote in the district. She resigned to become CEO of the National Rural Electric Cooperative.

U.S. House of Representatives - District 8 – Perry County (2012)
Party	Candidate	Votes	%	±%
Republican	Jo Ann Emerson	6,272	80.16	+9.19
Democratic	Jack Rushin	1,326	16.95	−5.89
Libertarian	Rick Vandeven	226	2.89	+1.03

U.S. House of Representatives - District 8 - Special Election – Perry County (2013)
Party	Candidate	Votes	%	±%
Republican	Jason T. Smith	1,240	72.09	
Democratic	Steve Hodges	380	22.09	
Constitution	Doug Enyart	63	3.66	
Libertarian	Bill Slantz	35	2.03	
Write-In	Robert W. George	1	0.06	
Write-In	Thomas Brown	1	0.06	

U.S. House of Representatives - District 8 – Perry County (2020)
Party	Candidate	Votes	%	±%
Republican	Jason T. Smith	7,397	80.82	
Democratic	Kathy Ellis	1,621	17.71	
Libertarian	Tom Schmitz	134	1.46	

==== Political culture ====
United States presidential election results for Perry County, Missouri
Year	Republican		Democratic		Third party(ies)	
Year	No.	%	No.	%	No.	%
1888	1,198	47.33%	1,283	50.69%	50	1.98%
1892	1,297	46.89%	1,464	52.93%	5	0.18%
1896	1,522	50.56%	1,450	48.17%	38	1.26%
1900	1,681	49.85%	1,660	49.23%	31	0.92%
1904	1,733	52.45%	1,522	46.07%	49	1.48%
1908	1,775	52.53%	1,569	46.43%	35	1.04%
1912	1,735	50.86%	1,564	45.85%	112	3.28%
1916	1,988	58.40%	1,396	41.01%	20	0.59%
1920	3,652	70.49%	1,504	29.03%	25	0.48%
1924	7,280	47.78%	6,568	43.11%	1,388	9.11%
1928	2,648	50.49%	2,591	49.40%	6	0.11%
1932	2,396	40.49%	3,502	59.19%	19	0.32%
1936	3,382	51.20%	3,098	46.90%	126	1.91%
1940	4,656	66.33%	2,354	33.54%	9	0.13%
1944	4,207	67.57%	2,014	32.35%	5	0.08%
1948	2,903	57.56%	2,133	42.30%	7	0.14%
1952	4,633	66.57%	2,324	33.39%	3	0.04%
1956	4,400	65.22%	2,346	34.78%	0	0.00%
1960	3,886	56.51%	2,991	43.49%	0	0.00%
1964	2,837	45.08%	3,456	54.92%	0	0.00%
1968	3,858	61.45%	1,958	31.19%	462	7.36%
1972	4,736	70.80%	1,953	29.20%	0	0.00%
1976	4,086	59.06%	2,801	40.49%	31	0.45%
1980	5,053	65.72%	2,416	31.42%	220	2.86%
1984	4,493	70.98%	1,837	29.02%	0	0.00%
1988	3,836	64.08%	2,136	35.68%	14	0.23%
1992	3,205	44.19%	2,525	34.82%	1,522	20.99%
1996	3,427	50.54%	2,517	37.12%	837	12.34%
2000	4,667	67.61%	2,085	30.20%	151	2.19%
2004	5,583	67.70%	2,621	31.78%	43	0.52%
2008	5,527	63.92%	3,005	34.75%	115	1.33%
2012	5,669	70.98%	2,184	27.34%	134	1.68%
2016	6,908	79.04%	1,520	17.39%	312	3.57%
2020	7,657	81.05%	1,664	17.61%	126	1.33%
2024	7,986	81.29%	1,757	17.88%	81	0.82%

At the presidential level, Perry County is a reliably Republican stronghold. John McCain easily carried the county over Barack Obama in 2008, and George W. Bush carried Perry County by even stronger margins in 2000 and 2004. The last Democratic presidential nominee to win Perry County was Lyndon B. Johnson in the landslide Election of 1964.

Like most rural areas, voters in Perry County generally adhere to socially and culturally conservative principles which strongly influence their Republican leanings. In 2004, Missourians voted on a constitutional amendment to define marriage as the union between a man and a woman—it overwhelmingly passed Perry County with 85.07 percent of the vote. The initiative passed the state with 71 percent of support from voters as Missouri became the first state to ban same-sex marriage. In 2006, Missourians voted on a constitutional amendment to fund and legalize embryonic stem cell research in the state—it failed in Perry County with 69.45 percent voting against the measure. The initiative narrowly passed the state with 51 percent of support from voters as Missouri became one of the first states in the nation to approve embryonic stem cell research. Despite Perry County's longstanding tradition of supporting socially conservative platforms, voters in the county have a penchant for advancing populist causes like increasing the minimum wage. In 2006, Missourians voted on a proposition (Proposition B) to increase the minimum wage in the state to $6.50 an hour—it passed Perry County with 69.52 percent of the vote. The proposition strongly passed every single county in Missouri with 75.94 percent voting in favor as the minimum wage was increased to $6.50 an hour in the state. During the same election, voters in five other states also strongly approved increases in the minimum wage.

=== Missouri presidential preference primary (2008) ===
Unlike many of the rural areas in Missouri that backed former Governor Mike Huckabee (R-Arkansas), Perry County provided U.S. Senator John McCain (R-Arizona) with his third strongest showing in Missouri. However, former U.S. Senator Hillary Clinton (D-New York) received more votes, a total of 1,180, than any candidate from either party in Perry County during the 2008 presidential primary.

== Education ==
Of adults 25 years of age and older in Perry County, 71.2% possesses a high school diploma while 9.9% holds a bachelor's degree or higher as their highest educational attainment.

=== Public schools ===
- Altenburg 48 Elementary School - Altenburg - (K-08)
- Perry County School District No. 32 - Perryville
  - Perryville Early Childhood Special Education Center (PK)
  - Perryville Elementary School (K-04)
  - Perry County Middle School (05-08)
  - Perryville High School (09-12)
  - Perryville Area Career & Technology Center (09-12)

=== Private schools ===
- United in Christ Lutheran School - Frohna - (PK-8) - Lutheran Church–Missouri Synod
- Immanuel Lutheran School, Perryville - (PK-8) - Lutheran Church–Missouri Synod
- St. Vincent De Paul Schools, Perryville - (PK-12) - Roman Catholic
  - St. Vincent De Paul Elementary School (PK-6)
  - St. Vincent De Paul High School (7-12)

=== Public libraries ===
- Altenburg Branch Library
- Perryville Branch Library

== Tourism & attractions ==
Perry County offers a number of historic, architectural and scenic attractions.

Visitors can explore the grounds of the St. Mary's of the Barrens Seminary, the first college founded west of the Mississippi River dating back to 1827. Other features include the National Shrine of our Lady of the Miraculous Medal, the Rosati Log Cabin, the Countess Estelle Doheny Museum with its priceless Gospel of St. John from the Gutenberg Bible and the Bishop Edward Sheehan Memorial Museum and Rare Book Room. Guided tours of the museums are available by request.

In Perryville, the county seat, is a square surrounding the Perry County Courthouse built in 1904 with its chiming clock tower. The square has streets, decorative sidewalks, "Washington" style light fixtures and decorative tree plantings. A brick-paved plaza, landscaped seating areas, park benches, a sundial, a drinking fountain, a directional marker and a gazebo have been added to the courthouse lawn.

On the northeastern corner of the square sits the Levi Block building constructed around 1829, which is thought to be the oldest remaining commercial building in Perryville. It now houses Hilderbrand Jewelers.

The Faherty House, located at 11 S. Spring Street, was originally constructed by Henry Burns in 1825 as a two-room stone house with a basement. It is thought to be the oldest remaining residence in the city. A brick, two-room addition to the house was built in the 1850s. The house also stands on one of the original town lots of Perryville. The restored house features a circa 1830-1890 exterior and interior and is owned and maintained by the Perry County Historical Society.

The Perry County Museum is located at the entrance of the Perryville City Park in the Doerr House, (Wednesday and weekends, May–October).

In southeastern Perry County near the Mississippi River are the early German villages of Frohna, Altenburg, and Wittenberg.

The Saxon Lutheran Memorial in Frohna is dedicated to the preservation of the religious and cultural heritage of the 1839 Saxon Immigration to Missouri (daily, year-round). The memorial boasts two original log houses, a large log barn, a collection of tools and antique farm machinery, a visitor center, country store and gift shop.

In Altenburg, visit the Concordia Log Cabin College (1839), the Loeber Log Cabin (1839) and Trinity Lutheran Church (1867). The log cabin college was the first Lutheran Seminary west of the Mississippi River. Guided tours of historic Altenburg are also available by appointment.

Traveling south, visit the Tower Rock Natural Area, a designated national landmark, which features a 10-mile (16 km) hiking trail. Tower Rock is a 60-foot (18 m) high rock, which stands majestically in the Mississippi River. The history of Tower Rock dates to 1698, when three missionaries established a landing atop the rocky island. Nearby, the early 19th century settlement of Apple Creek features the Lady of St. Joseph Shrine.

Perry County has approximately 650 known caves. It has more caves than any other county in Missouri, which is nicknamed "The Cave State."

== Communities ==
=== Cities ===
- Altenburg
- Frohna
- Perryville (county seat)

=== Village ===
- Longtown

=== Census-designated places ===
- Biehle
- Brewer
- Lithium
- Shakertowne

=== Unincorporated communities ===
- Allen's Landing
- Apple Creek
- Barks
- Belgique
- Brazeau
- Brewer
- Claryville
- Corners
- Crosstown
- Eureka
- Farrar
- Fenwick Settlement
- Friedenberg
- Highland
- McBride
- Menfro
- Millheim
- Old Appleton
- Pointrest
- Schalls
- Schumer Springs
- Sereno
- Seventy-Six
- Silver Lake
- Uniontown
- Wittenberg
- Yount

=== Former communities ===
- Dresden
- Fenwick Settlement
- Friendlytown
- Giboney
- Le Grand Village Sauvage
- Pointrest
- Seelitz
- Seventy-Six
- Starlanding
- Tucker's Settlement

=== Townships ===
- Bois Brule
- Brazeau
- Central
- Cinque Hommes
- St. Mary's
- Salem
- Saline
- Union

=== Islands ===
- Grand Tower Island

== See also ==
- National Register of Historic Places listings in Perry County, Missouri
