= Corners, Missouri =

Corners, Perry County, Missouri
- unincorporated community
- Location of Perry County, Missouri
- Coordinates: 37°39′23″N 90°06′39″W
- Country: United States
- State: Missouri
- County: Perry
- Township: St. Mary's
- Elevation: 804 ft (245 m)
- Time zone: UTC-6 (Central (CST))
  - Summer (DST): UTC-5 (CDT)
- ZIP code: 63775
- Area code: 573
- GNIS feature ID: 739934

Corners is an unincorporated community in Saint Mary's Township in Perry County, Missouri, United States. Corners is situated in the southwest corner of Perry County, near the St. Francois County line, northwest of Yount. The name is presumed to have been derived from its location in the corner of Perry County, as with Crossroads.
