= Grace Lutheran Church (Uniontown, Missouri) =

Grace Lutheran Church, Uniontown, Missouri
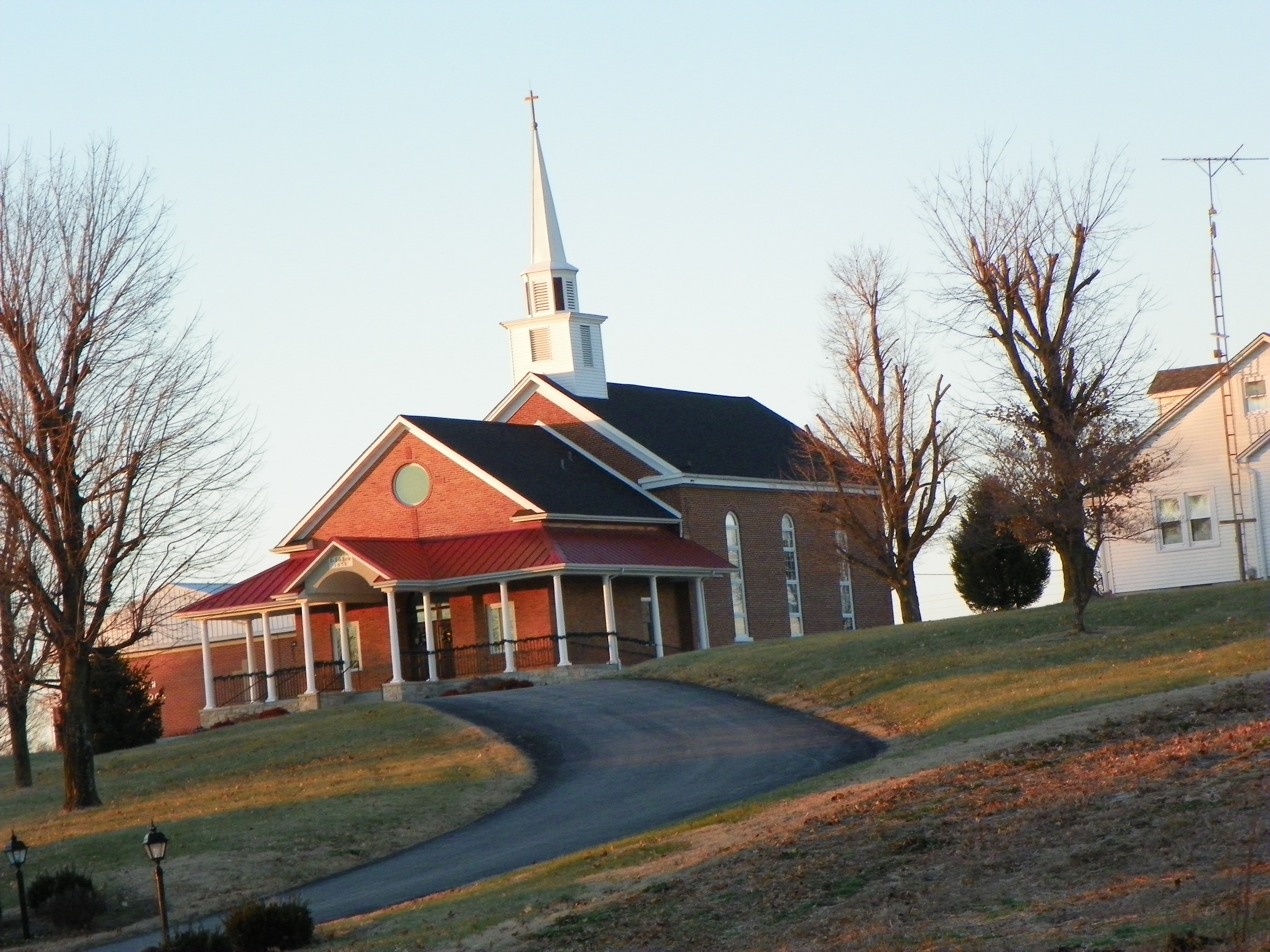

- Location within Missouri
- 37°36′53″N 89°42′50″W
- Location: 53 Grace Lane, Uniontown, Missouri 63783
- Country: United States
- Denomination: Lutheran Church–Missouri Synod

History
- Founded: February 2, 1840
- Dedicated: January 9, 1876

Architecture
- Construction cost: $6,000 (1876 dollars)

Administration
- District: Missouri District

Grace Lutheran Church in Uniontown, Missouri is a member congregation of the Lutheran Church–Missouri Synod (LCMS).

== History ==
The Lutheran settlement at Uniontown, Missouri, was not exactly a part of the original immigration of 700 persons from Germany in 1839. These German immigrants came the same route as the earlier migration from Bremen, Germany, to New Orleans and then on to Perry County, Missouri. However, they did not arrive with the earlier migration in April, 1839. They left in September, 1839 and arrived in Perry County on December 12, 1839.

Since many of the German settlers came from Pastor Gruber's congregation in Paitzdorf, Germany, the fifteen people who organized the church on February 2, 1840, decided to name the church "The Old Lutheran Church of Paitzdorf, Perry County, state of Missouri." The term "Old Lutheran" refers to the German usage "Alt-Lutheraner" and describes those Lutherans who remained independent and did not join with the state churches that combined both Lutheran and Reformed churches in one single organization.

Worship and education were carried out in the homes of families until the first log school was built in 1856.

The congregation joined the Lutheran Church-Missouri Synod in 1852, and became a charter congregation of the Western District of that synod.

In 1874 plans were made to construct a new church at an estimated cost of $5,000. However, costs would exceed the initial $5,000 by another $1,000. The plans called for a building 55 feet (17 m) long, 34 feet (10 m) wide, and 20 feet (6.1 m) tall with a tower and steeple of 75 feet (23 m). Clay for the bricks was dug and fired nearby. The Young Men's Club contributed to the purchase of the bell. The church was dedicated on January 9, 1876.

In 1880 a new brick parsonage was built and served the congregation until 1951 when a new parsonage was constructed.

Changes were made to the church in the late 1800s. In 1897 the church steeple from the roof up was covered with corrugated metal sheeting. The following year the ceiling was treated to a tin covering. A new school was built in 1906 and served that purpose until a new school was built in 1954. An addition to the rear of the church was constructed in 1913 to serve as both a vestry and room for confirmation instruction. In 1921, a teacherage was purchased and used until the construction of a new teacherage in 1946.

From the beginning services were conducted in German. In 1927, English services were conducted once a month. Sunday Christian instruction (Christenlehre) continued to be conducted in German until at least 1943. In 1929, the congregation adopted the name "Grace Evangelical Lutheran Church" as its official name, with the term "Evangelical" deriving from German and meaning "Protestant."

In 1938, a new third cemetery was laid out and the church’s pipe organ was purchased. In the 1940s events in Europe and World War II brought a growing desire to hold more English services than German.

On August 11, 1963, Grace formed a dual parish with Zion Lutheran Church in Longtown due to a shortage of pastors.

A tornado struck the church on December 15, 1971, toppling the tower and steeple onto the roof after first removing most of the roof. The interior suffered minor water damage. On May 21, 1972, a new fiberglass steeple was constructed on top of the bell tower, and the tower and steeple were raised to 42 feet 7.5 inches (12.992 m) above the roof top. The repairs amounted to almost $10,000.

The school closed in 1985, with students attending other Lutheran schools in the area. The teacherage was sold in 1986.

In 2008, a new narthex and porch were added to the front of the church.

== School ==
Grace Lutheran Church operated a parochial elementary school between 1856 and 1985. Classes were first held in a log cabin until a new brick school could be built in 1906. The school closed in 1985.

== Parish ==
Since August 11, 1963, Grace has been a member of a dual parish formed with Zion in Longtown. The pastor's parsonage is located in Uniontown.

== Gallery ==
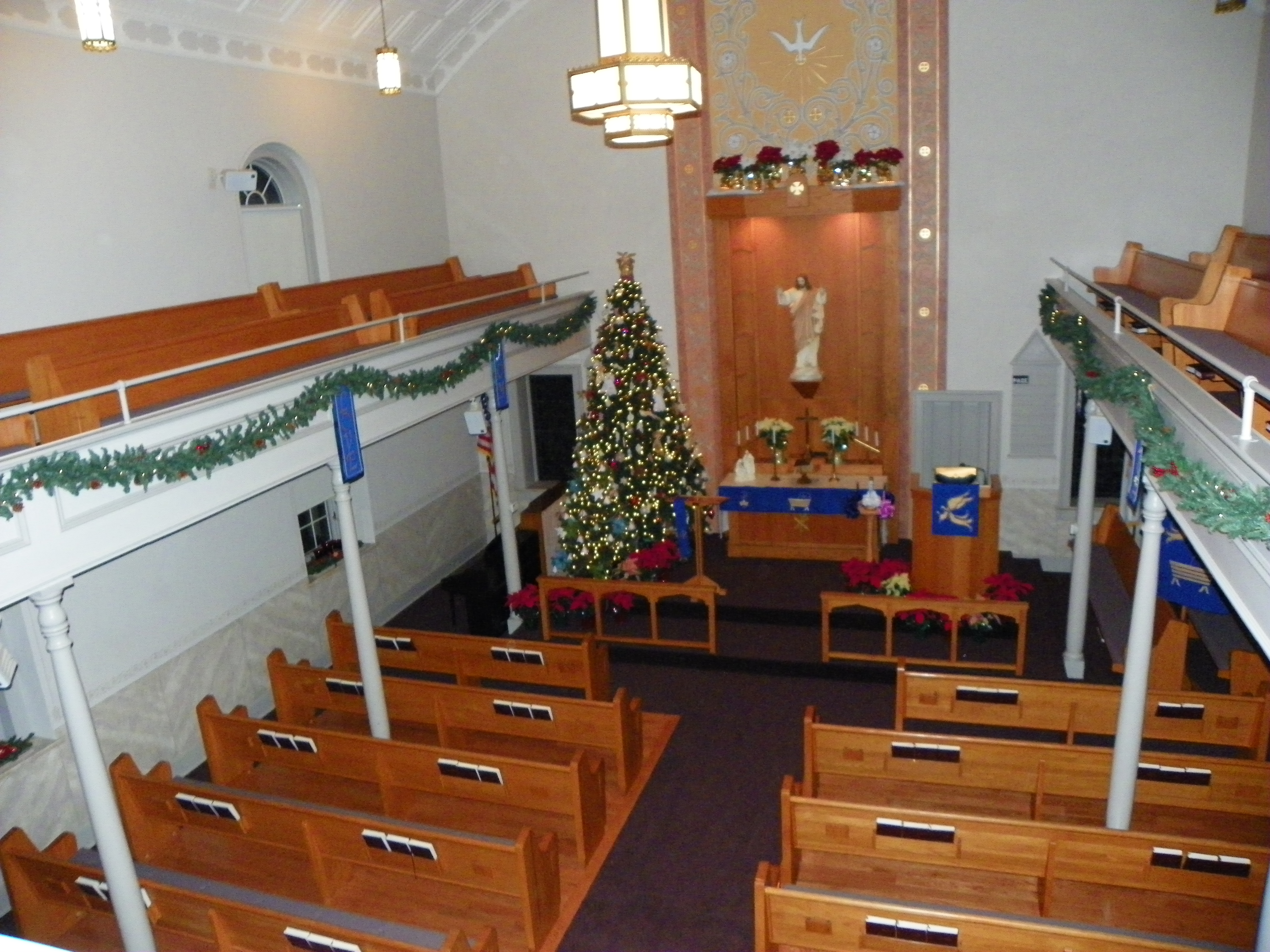
Interior

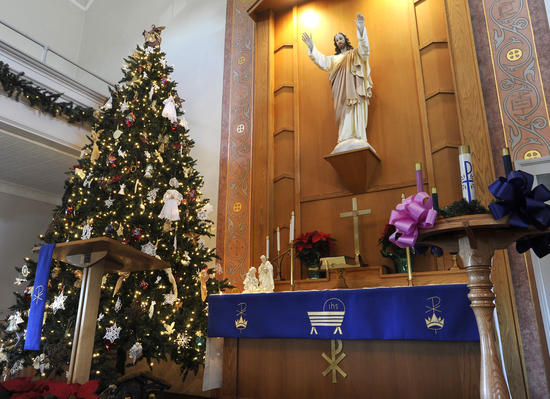
Altar

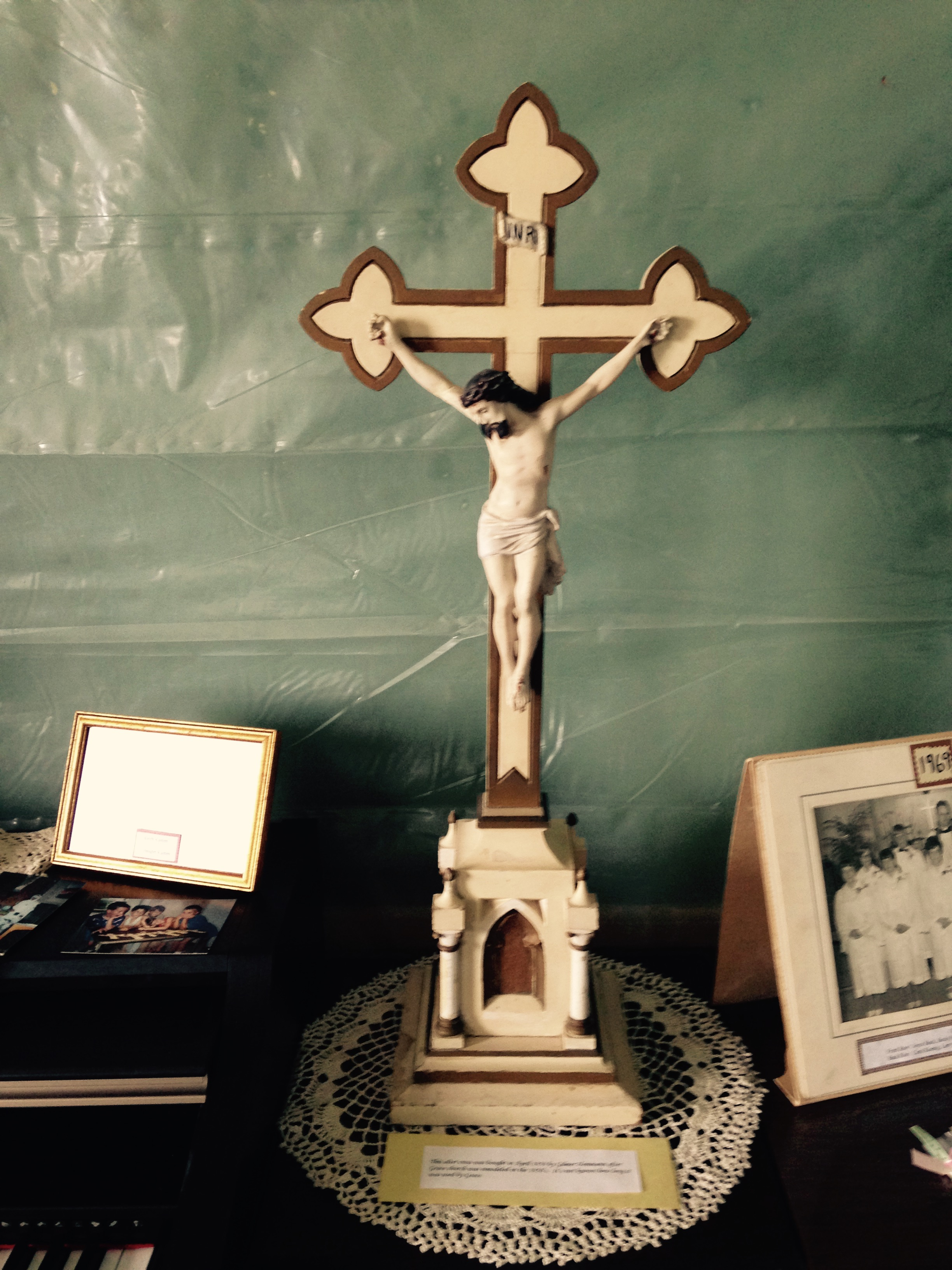
Crucifix
