= Giboney, Missouri =

- Abandoned village
- Location of Perry County, Missouri
- Coordinates: 37°48′17″N 89°59′26″W
- Country: United States
- State: Missouri
- County: Perry
- Township: Saline
- Elevation: 512 ft (156 m)
- Time zone: UTC-6 (Central (CST))
  - Summer (DST): UTC-5 (CDT)
- ZIP code: 63775
- Area code: 573
- FIPS code: 29-26945
- GNIS feature ID: 740869

Giboney was an unincorporated community in Saline Township in Perry County, Missouri, United States.

Giboney was situated just west of Brewer in Saline Township in the northwest part of Perry County, situated along the south Fork Saline Creek and state route NN. It was a station on the Saline Valley Line. The community may have been named for the railroad executive Louis Houck's wife, Mary H. Giboney.

The Giboney station on Old Lead Road was located between the Brewer and Minnith stations of the Cape Girardeau Northern Railway, which ran from Ancell (Cape Girardeau & Thebes Bridge Terminal) to Farmington. Louis Houck built the Cape Girardeau & Chester Railroad in 1905, later the Cape Girardeau Northern Railroad, but it floundered due to financial difficulties that led to bankruptcy. Service was limited to stations only in Cape Girardeau by circa 1925.

The village was situated approximately 26.5 miles from the Mississippi River.
