= Perryville High School =

Perryville High School may refer to:

- Perryville High School (Arkansas), Perryville, Arkansas
- Perryville High School (Maryland), Perryville, Maryland
- Perryville High School (Missouri), see Perry County 32 School District (Missouri)
