= Longtown, Missouri =

- Village
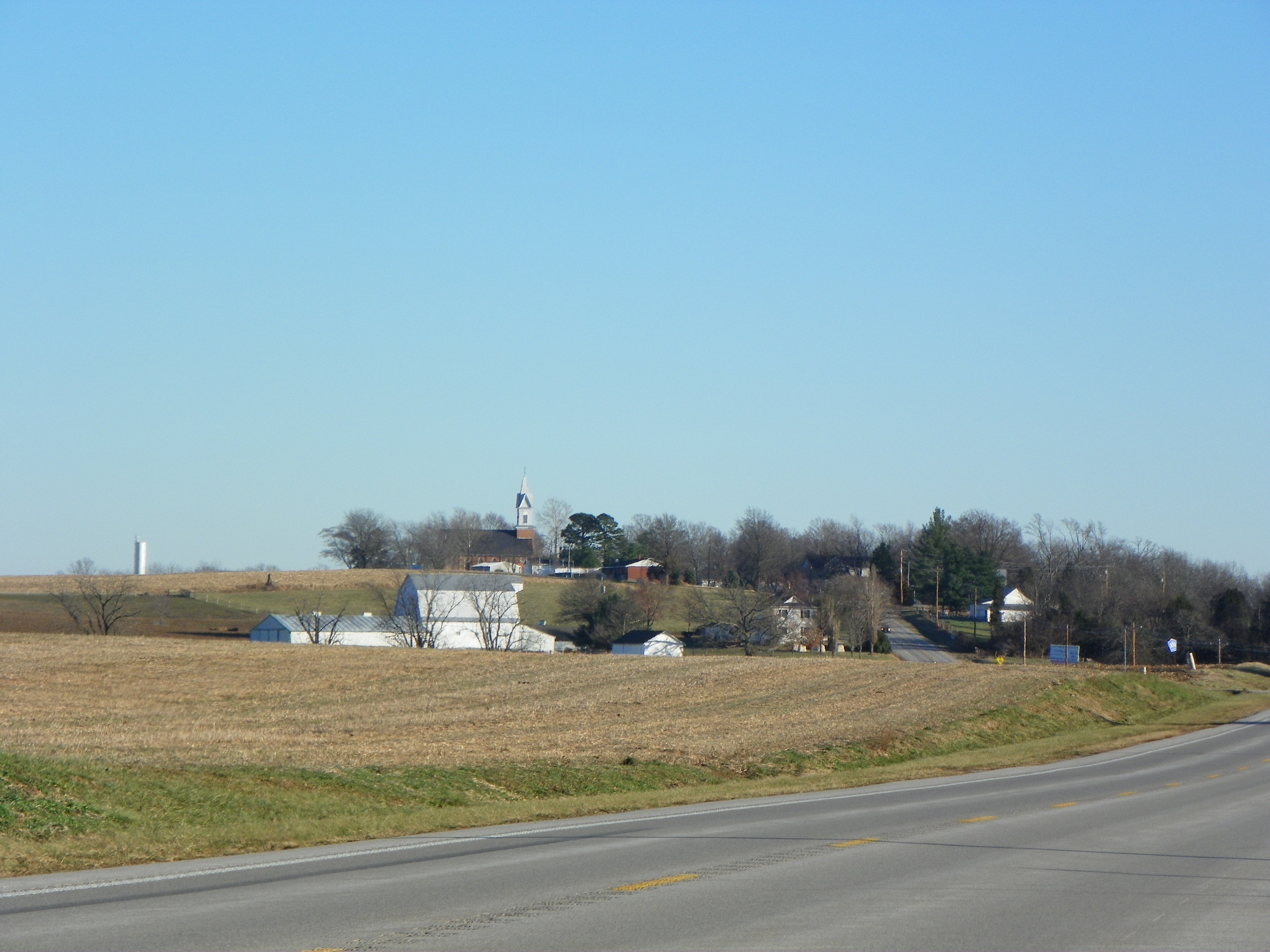
- Longtown, Missouri from Highway 61

- Location of Longtown, Missouri
- Coordinates: 37°40′13″N 89°46′27″W
- Country: United States
- State: Missouri
- County: Perry
- Township: Union

Area
  - Total: 0.12 sq mi (0.32 km^{2})
  - Land: 0.12 sq mi (0.32 km^{2})
  - Water: 0 sq mi (0.00 km^{2})
- Elevation: 656 ft (200 m)

Population (2020)
  - Total: 90
  - Density: 721.0/sq mi (278.38/km^{2})
- Time zone: UTC-6 (Central (CST))
  - Summer (DST): UTC-5 (CDT)
- ZIP code: 63775
- Area code: 573
- FIPS code: 29-43940
- GNIS feature ID: 2396724

Longtown is a village in Union Township in Perry County, Missouri, United States. The population was 90 at the 2020 census.

== History ==
Some of the earliest Europeans to put down roots in the area were English and Scotch-Irish Presbyterian settlers from Rowan, Iredell, Cabarrus, and Mecklenburg counties in North Carolina who settled to the south in Brazeau in 1817. Soon after, in 1821, they were followed by English and Scotch-Irish Methodists also hailing from North Carolina, settling in the present area of Longtown. Among the earliest families were the Abernathys, Farrars, and Rutledgers. These settlers were part of a large exodus from the Piedmont region of North Carolina following the War of 1812. In 1826 these settlers built their first log meeting house which was replaced with York Chapel Methodist church in 1836.

The settlement was initially known as the “Abernathy Settlement”, although at this point the settlement could not be considered an organized community, as the population lay scattered on farms in the surrounding area. Emil Urban and Oliver Abernathy were the first merchants in the settlement. By 1860 a core community had formed along the King’s Road (French: Le Chemin du Roi, Spanish: El Camino Real), known today as King’s Highway, but also known then as the Perryville-Jackson Road.

In April 1874 the town had been incorporated as "Longtown". Two theories abound to the origin of the name. One early explanation gives that the town was named after a German couple that immigrated to the area – Johann and Maria Lang (Lang being German for ‘long’). The other explanation given is that the town was named after John Long, one of the earlier settlers. The first mayor was Velentine Bergmann. A post office was established in 1883 (closing in 1966).

Up until 1881 the Protestant German population had been members of the Frieden (Peace) Lutheran Congregation in nearby Friedenberg. However, due to the dirt roads becoming impassable in wet seasons or freezing temperatures in winter, the need for a local church had grown. In 1882, Rev. A.G. Wetzel organized the Cross Congregation Lutheran Church, Ohio Synod, in the school house in Longtown with former members of the Peace Lutheran Congregation of Friedenberg who followed the distinctive teachings of the Ohio Synod. However, the church faced poor prospects because of limited membership.

Another Lutheran church - Zion Lutheran Church Missouri Synod - was established in 1897 with Rev. G.D. Hamm acting as the first pastor. The original Zion Lutheran church was built of wood, but by 1912 had been replaced by the present brick church.

By 1883, the members of Cross Lutheran church had been asked to leave the schoolhouse as the building belonged to "Longtowners". Rev. Wetzel moved to a different location, more north-east of Longtown and organized and built the Cross Lutheran Church, Ohio Synod. The small church only existed for 15 years from 1883 to 1898. Only the small Cross Cemetery remains along country road #316.

In the early part of the 20th century Longtown had a population of 158, with two churches, a public school, three general stores, a bank, a tavern and a flouring mill, and had largely remained a farming community. On April 20, 1936, the Hacker & Funke General Store and Barbershop had suffered severe fire damage. In 1946 the Friedenberg Parochial School consolidated with the Longtown Parochial School. In 1981 a fire completely destroyed the Wallace Hacker General Store.

== Geography ==
According to the United States Census Bureau, the village has a total area of 0.13 square miles (0.34 km^{2}), all land.

== Location of Nearby Communities ==
Nearby communities

== Demographics ==
Historical population
Census	Pop.	Note	%±
1900	108		—
1910	158		46.3%
1920	162		2.5%
1930	150		−7.4%
1940	138		−8.0%
1950	139		0.7%
1960	113		−18.7%
1970	113		0.0%
1980	121		7.1%
1990	107		−11.6%
2000	76		−29.0%
2010	102		34.2%
2020	90		−11.8%
U.S. Decennial Census 2020

=== 2010 census ===
As of the census of 2010, there were 102 people, 39 households, and 30 families residing in the village. The population density was 784.6 inhabitants per square mile (302.9/km^{2}). There were 47 housing units at an average density of 361.5 per square mile (139.6/km^{2}). The racial makeup of the village was 99.02% White and 0.98% from other races. Hispanic or Latino of any race were 1.96% of the population.

There were 39 households, of which 33.3% had children under the age of 18 living with them, 74.4% were married couples living together, 2.6% had a male householder with no wife present, and 23.1% were non-families. 23.1% of all households were made up of individuals, and 2.6% had someone living alone who was 65 years of age or older. The average household size was 2.62 and the average family size was 3.07.

The median age in the village was 36.7 years. 26.5% of residents were under the age of 18; 2.8% were between the ages of 18 and 24; 31.3% were from 25 to 44; 26.5% were from 45 to 64; and 12.7% were 65 years of age or older. The gender makeup of the village was 50.0% male and 50.0% female.

=== 2000 census ===
As of the census of 2000, there were 76 people, 31 households, and 23 families residing in the town. The population density was 595.4 inhabitants per square mile (229.9/km^{2}). There were 41 housing units at an average density of 321.2 per square mile (124.0/km^{2}). The racial makeup of the town was 98.68% White, 1.32% from other races. Hispanic or Latino of any race were 1.32% of the population.

There were 31 households, out of which 22.6% had children under the age of 18 living with them, 71.0% were married couples living together, 3.2% had a female householder with no husband present, and 22.6% were non-families. 12.9% of all households were made up of individuals, and 3.2% had someone living alone who was 65 years of age or older. The average household size was 2.45 and the average family size was 2.71.

In the town the population was spread out, with 18.4% under the age of 18, 6.6% from 18 to 24, 36.8% from 25 to 44, 23.7% from 45 to 64, and 14.5% who were 65 years of age or older. The median age was 39 years. For every 100 females, there were 130.3 males. For every 100 females age 18 and over, there were 113.8 males.

The median income for a household in the town was $55,000, and the median income for a family was $55,000. Males had a median income of $31,094 versus $20,750 for females. The per capita income for the town was $22,724. There were 14.3% of families and 7.9% of the population living below the poverty line, including no under eighteens and 66.7% of those over 64.

== Gallery ==
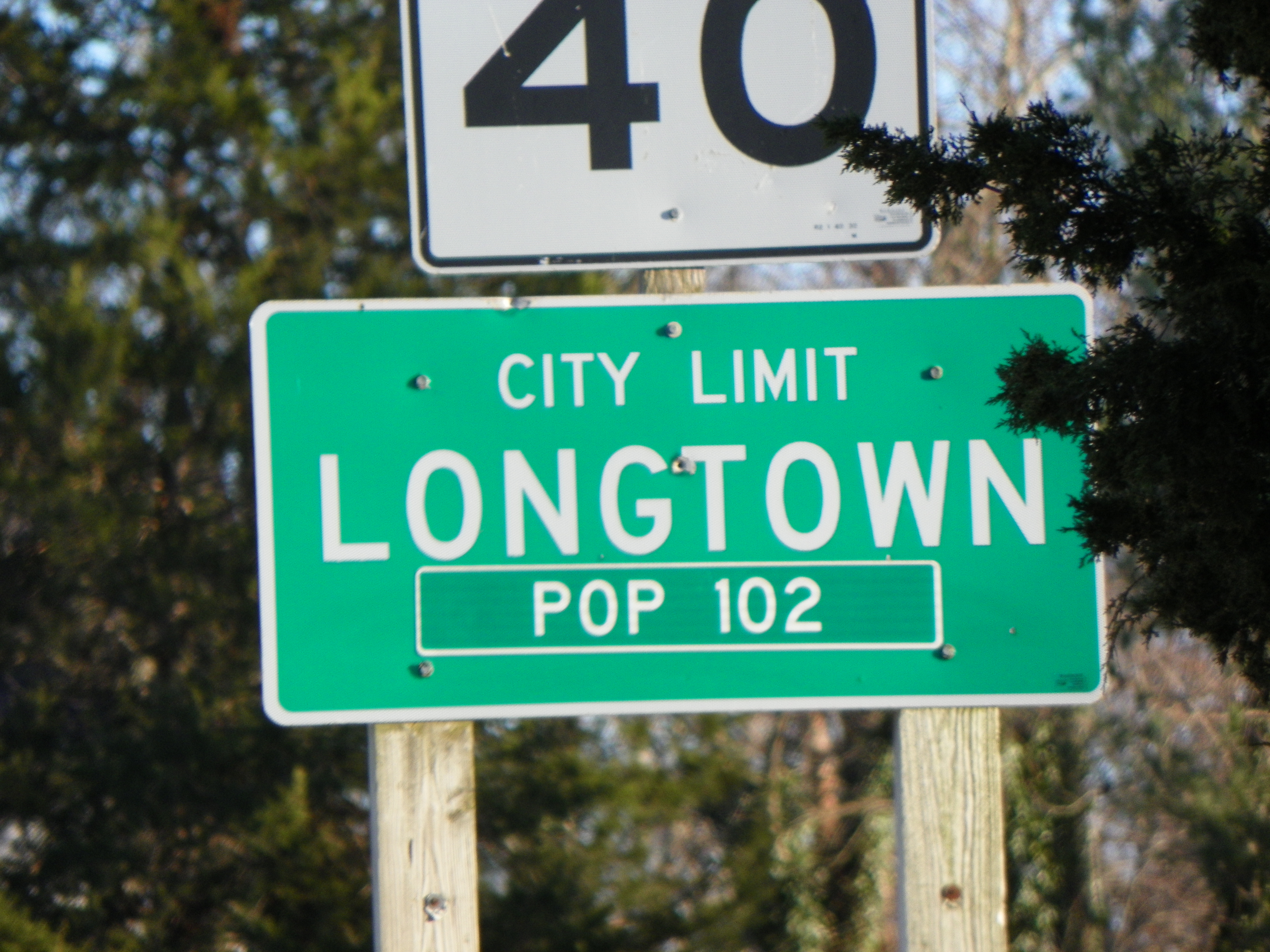
Population Road sign

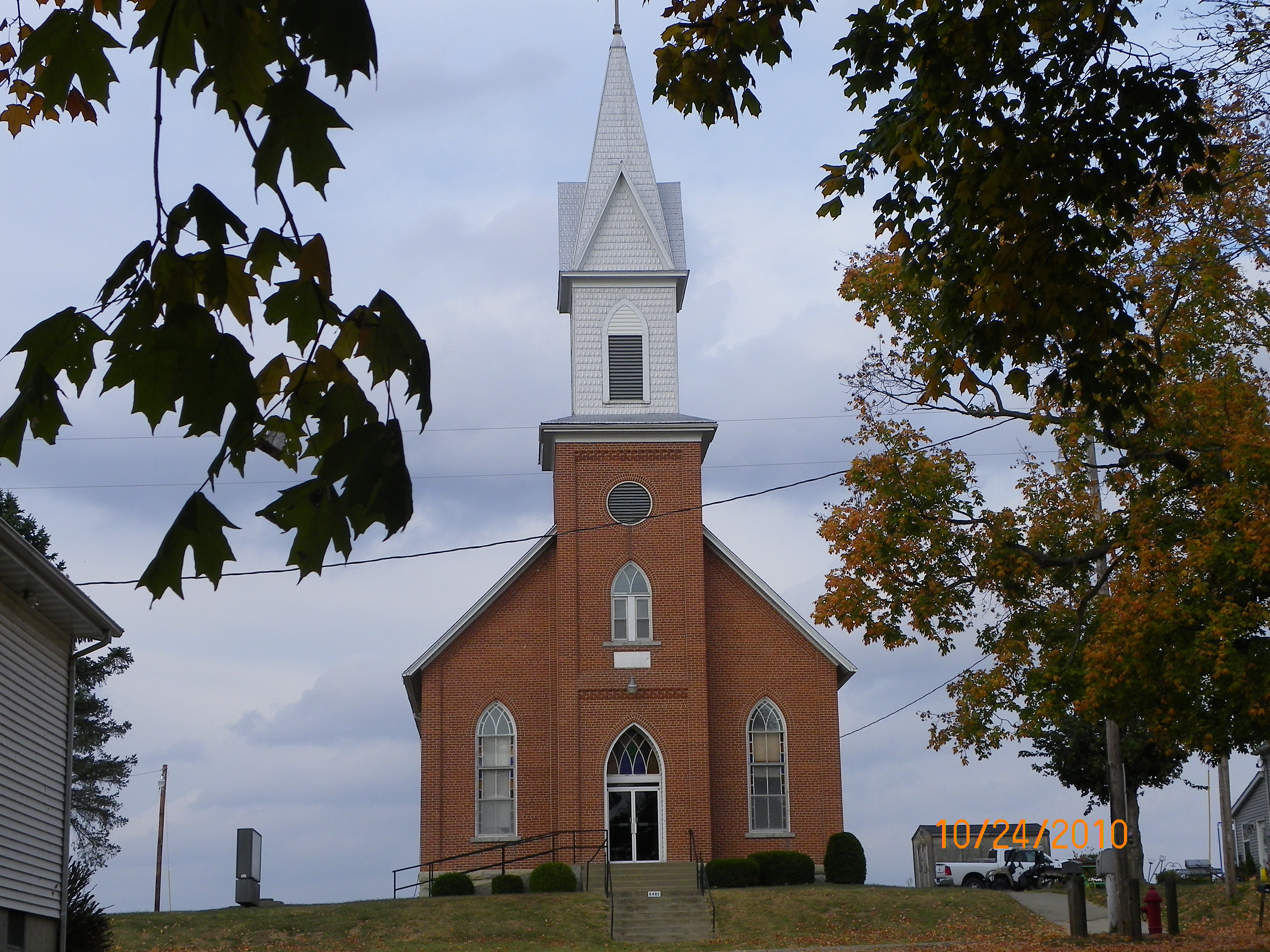
Zion Lutheran Church

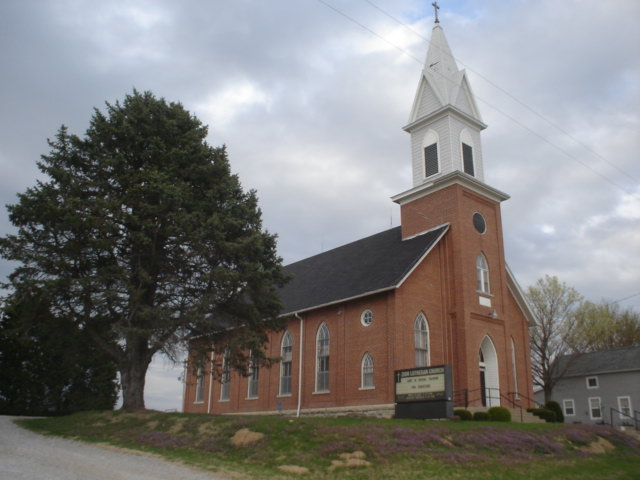
Zion Lutheran Church

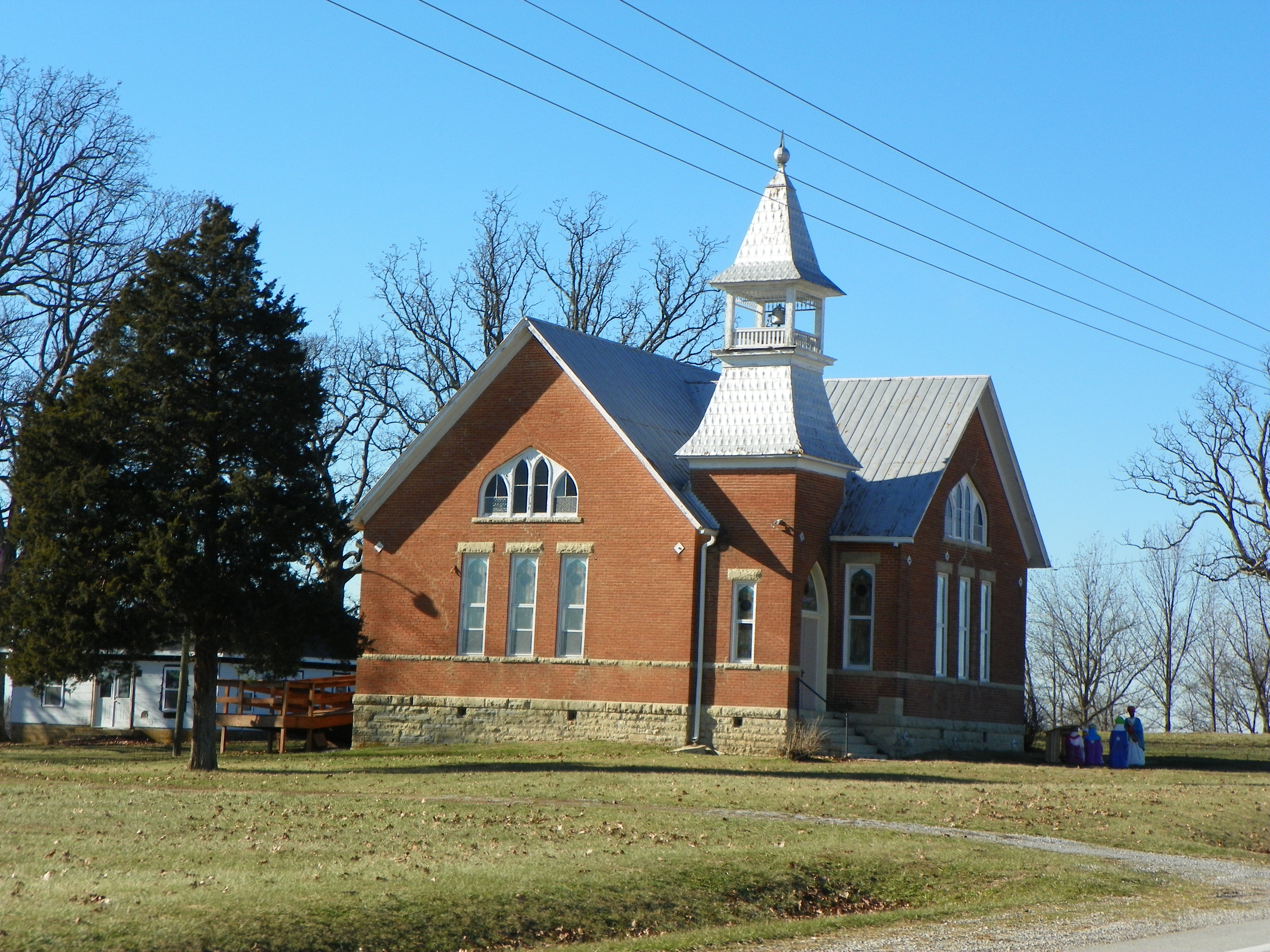
York Methodist Chapel
