= Tucker's Settlement, Missouri =

Coordinates: 37.796°N 90.001°W

Tucker’s Settlement, Missouri
- Abandoned village
- Location of Perry County, Missouri
- Country: United States
- State: Missouri
- County: Perry
- Township: Saline
- Named for: Tucker families
- GNIS Feature ID: 736951

Tucker’s Settlement is an abandoned village in Saline Township in Perry County, Missouri, United States.

Originally, there were two Tucker Settlements in Perry County: "Long Tucker's Settlement" and "Short Tucker's Settlement". Long Tucker's Settlement was situated in Saline Township on Saline Creek, while Short Tucker Settlement was located further south in the Barrens, which is the present site of Perryville.

The two settlements were founded by two different Tucker families who had arrived at the same time in what would become Perry County, Missouri in the late 18th century. Joseph Tucker and his nine sons: James, Nicholas, William, Francis, John, Peter, Thomas, Joseph, and Michael, who were Catholic, settled along Saline Creek and were known as the "Long Tuckers" due to their tall stature, whereas the other family, which was much shorter in stature, settled to the south and were known as the "Short Tuckers". The "Long Tucker" settlement simply became known as "Tucker's Settlement" and had approximately 60 inhabitants in 1809. Nothing remains of Tucker's Settlement, except Keith Cemetery, where many of the inhabitants had been buried.

== GNIS reference ==
This settlement is recorded in the Geographic Names Information System (GNIS) at location of unknown.
