= Schalls, Missouri =

Unincorporated community in Missouri, U.S.

Schalls, Missouri.
- unincorporated community
- Location of Perry County, Missouri
- Coordinates: 37°40′01″N 89°41′11″W
- Country: United States
- State: Missouri
- County: Perry
- Township: Union
- Elevation: 620 ft (189 m)
- Time zone: UTC-6 (Central (CST))
  - Summer (DST): UTC-5 (CDT)
- ZIP code: 63775
- Area code: 573
- GNIS feature ID: 726093

Schalls is an unincorporated community in Union Township in Perry County, Missouri, United States. Schalls is situated in the north-central corner of Perry County. A post office was maintained from 1886 through 1910. The community was named after Maritz Schall, a pioneer stock dealer and farmer.
