= Central Township, Perry County, Missouri =

Township in the US state of Missouri

Central Township, Missouri
- Civil Township
- Location of Perry County
- Coordinates: 37°43′51″N 89°51′45″W
- Country: United States
- State: Missouri
- County: Perry
- Established: Places of the USA: Bois Brule Township

Area
  - Total: 48 sq mi (124 km^{2})
  - Land: 47 sq mi (123 km^{2})
  - Water: 0.39 sq mi (1 km^{2}) 0.81%
- GNIS Feature ID: 767153

Central Township is one of the eight townships located in Perry County, Missouri, United States. It contains part of the census-designated place of Shakertowne.

== Name ==
Central Township is located in the central part of Perry County, hence its name.

The Geographic Names Information System (GNIS) lists five townships named Central, including this one, in various counties of Missouri.

== History ==
The first European settlers in what is now Central Township arrived in 1800 and were Kentuckians who laid down farms around The Barrens. They had called their home in Kentucky The Barrens, a term used extensively to describe land which combines some of the features of timber land and prairie, the timber being scattering and possibly stunted. The term does not indicate poor soil. Finding the topographical conditions in Perry County to resemble that of their Kentucky home, the early settlers transferred the name to this region. The Kentucky Barrens lie east of Bowling Green and the Barren River, a tributary of Green River, and Barren County near the southern border of the state. The first settlers here were Tuckers, Moores, Haydens, and Laytons. The first settlement was made in 1801 by Isadore Moore. The town site for Perryville was selected in 1822 by Robert T. Brown, Joseph Tucker, and Thomas Riney, who had been appointed to select the seat of justice for Perry County. The land was surveyed and the town platted by William McLane in 1822 on land belonging to Bernard Layton. The first Catholic Seminary west of the Mississippi River was founded here in 1818 by Bishop Du Bourg and called St. Mary's-of-the-Barrens.

Central Township was organized in the years between 1870 and 1890. There is one incorporated community (Perryville, Missouri) and an unincorporated community (Friedenberg, Missouri) situated in the township.

== Geography ==
As its name indicates, Central Township is located in the middle of Perry County, Missouri. Cinque Hommes Creek flows through the township eastward towards the Mississippi River.

== Demographics ==
=== 2010 Census ===
As of the census of 2010, there were 10,875 people living in the township. The racial makeup of the township was 97.4% White, Black 0.2%, 0.2% American Indian and Alaska Native, 1.0% Asian, 0.6% Hispanic or Latino, and 0.5% from other races. The median age is 37.7, just above the US median of 37.3. 53.96% of people in Central Township (Perry county), MO are married, and 9.89% are divorced. 29.97% of people are married with children, and 15.28% have children but are single. The average household size is 2.48 people.
