= Barks, Perry County, Missouri =

Unincorporated community in Missouri, U.S.

Barks, Missouri
- unincorporated community
- Location of Perry County, Missouri
- Coordinates: 37°40′35″N 90°04′00″W
- Country: United States
- State: Missouri
- County: Perry
- Township: St. Mary's
- GNIS Feature ID: 753094

Barks is an unincorporated community in south-central St. Mary's Township in Perry County, Missouri, United States. Barks is situated in the northeastern part of Perry County. A post office was established in 1899, and remained in operation until 1919.
