= Eureka, Perry County, Missouri =

Unincorporated community in Missouri, US

- unincorporated community
- Location of Perry County, Missouri
- Coordinates: 37°40′44″N 89°44′13″W
- Country: United States
- State: Missouri
- County: Perry
- Township: Cinque Hommes
- Elevation: 640 ft (200 m)
- Time zone: UTC-6 (Central (CST))
  - Summer (DST): UTC-5 (CDT)
- ZIP code: 63775
- Area code: 573
- GNIS feature ID: 736426

Eureka is an unincorporated community in Cinque Hommes Township in Perry County, Missouri, United States. Eureka lies approximately eight miles east of Perryville, and about one mile east of Longtown. Eureka was named after the nearby school.
