= Union Township, Perry County, Missouri =

Township in the US state of Missouri

Union, Missouri
- Civil Township
- Location of Perry County
- Coordinates: 37°38′26″N 89°42′54″W
- Country: United States
- State: Missouri
- County: Perry

Area
  - Land: 45.6 sq mi (118.2 km^{2})
  - Water: 0 sq mi (0.0 km^{2})
- GNIS Feature ID: 767158

Union is one of the eight townships located in Perry County, Missouri, in the United States of America.

== Etymology ==
Union Township is named after Uniontown, Missouri. The town's original name, Paitzdorf, was changed during the American Civil War in response to Union soldiers encamped nearby.

== History ==
The area of Union Township was originally under the authority of the New Bourbon District, which was one of two districts formed by the French colonial administration of Upper Louisiana (New France). Authority passed from French to Spanish colonial administration when the colony was handed over to Spain in 1762. The French colonials in Ste. Genevieve were continuously harassed by Osage Indians to the south. Looking to stop the harassment and raids, the Spanish authorities in the 1790s invited Shawnee and Delaware Indians from Indiana and Ohio to immigrate and settle in the area around Apple Creek to act as a buffer against Osage raids. The Shawnee and Delaware established a number of villages around Apple Creek, with Le Grand Village Sauvage or "Big Village" as it was known to the Americans, being one of the largest. American harassment and encroachment on Shawnee and Delaware lands caused tensions and the eventual removal of the Shawnee and Delaware from the region.

Some of the earliest Europeans to put down roots in the area were English and Scotch-Irish Methodist settlers from North Carolina who settled in the Longtown area in 1821. Among the earliest families were the Abernathys, Farrars, and Rutledgers. These settlers were part of a large exodus from the Piedmont region of North Carolina following the War of 1812. The settlement was initially known as the "Abernathy Settlement". It is not clear why the name changed to Longtown. Later, in 1840 the village of Paitzdorf (Uniontown) was founded by members of the German Saxon Lutheran immigration. The King's Road (French: Le Chemin du Roi, Spanish: El Camino Real), runs through the township linking Perryville, Missouri to Jackson, Missouri.

Union Township was organized between 1870 and 1890.

== Geography ==
Union Township covers an area of 45.6 square miles (118 km^{2}) and contains one incorporated village: Longtown and the unincorporated villages of: Apple Creek, Schalls and Uniontown.

== Demographics ==
=== 2000 census ===
As of the census of 2000, there were 1,067 people living in the township. The racial makeup of the town was 98.50% White, 0.1% American Indian and Alaska Native, and 0.80% from other races.

=== 2010 census ===
As of the census of 2010, there were 1,062 people living in the township. The population density was 23 people per square mile. The racial makeup of the town was 98.50% White, 0.1% American Indian and Alaska Native, 0.1% Black, 0.7% Asian, and 0.5% from other races.

== Other Union townships ==
The Geographic Names Information System (GNIS) records 33 townships named Union in various counties of Missouri.
