= Starlanding, Missouri =

- Abandoned village
- Location of Perry County, Missouri
- Coordinates: 37°42′33″N 89°35′07″W
- Country: United States
- State: Missouri
- County: Perry
- Township: Brazeau
- Elevation: 364 ft (111 m)
- Time zone: UTC-6 (Central (CST))
  - Summer (DST): UTC-5 (CDT)
- ZIP code: 63775
- Area code: 573
- FIPS code: 29-70440
- GNIS feature ID: 741285

Starlanding was an unincorporated community in Brazeau Township in Perry County, Missouri, United States.

Starlanding was situated in the northern part of Brazeau Township in the eastern part of Perry County, along the Mississippi River at 364 ft. above sea level. The community was originally known as Star Landing, and was founded as a riverboat landing. Today, nothing remains of the town.
