= Peace Lutheran Church (Friedenberg, Missouri) =

Peace Lutheran Church, Friedenberg, Missouri
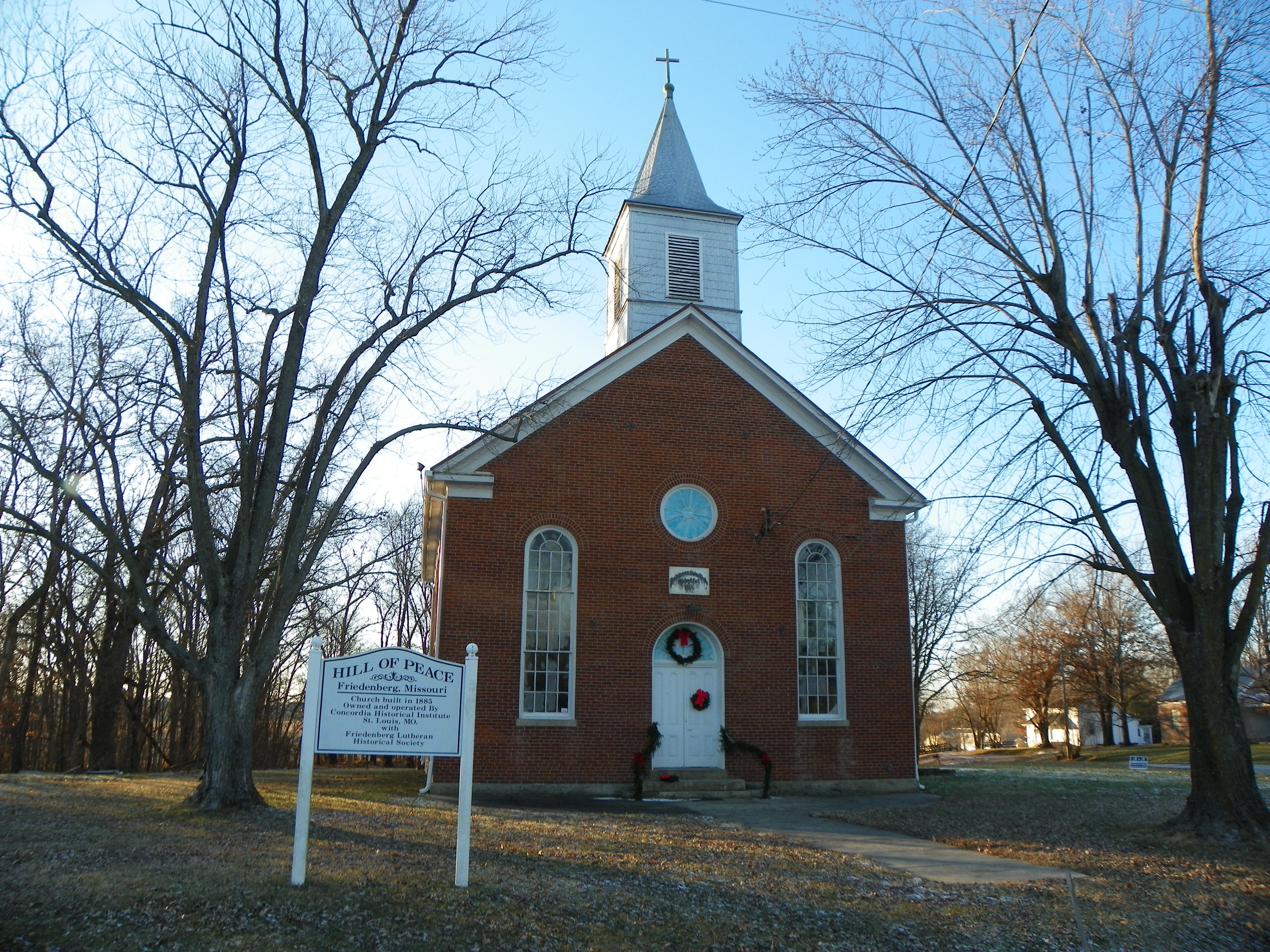
- Peace Lutheran Church

- Location of Peace Lutheran Church
- 37°42′03″N 89°47′38″W
- Location: Friedenberg, Missouri
- Country: United States
- Denomination: Lutheran Church–Missouri Synod

History
- Founded: 1838

Architecture
- Completed: 1885
- Closed: 1980

Administration
- District: Missouri District

Peace Lutheran Church is a former congregation of the Lutheran Church–Missouri Synod (LCMS) in Friedenberg, Missouri.

== Name ==
The Bavarians who settled just outside Perryville, Missouri, in the 1830s felt so strongly about the importance of peace that they named their town Friedenberg ("Hill of Peace") and their church Frieden ("Peace") Lutheran Church. The original name, Frieden Evangelical Lutheran Church of Friedenberg, followed the German tradition of using the word "Evangelical", meaning Protestant, as part of the name. The name Frieden is German for 'Peace'.

== History ==
The Bavarian immigrants who came in the summer of 1838, before the arrival of the Saxon Lutheran immigrants, worshiped in members' homes until a log church was built north of Cinque Hommes Creek in 1846, in a location known as Frankenberg or Hill of the Franks in German. Rev. C. F. Gruber of the Saxon Paitzdorf colony (present-day Uniontown) first served the congregation beginning in 1840. From 1852 to 1885, the congregation worshiped in a church on the Frankenberg hill overlooking Cinque Hommes bottom. Peace Lutheran Cemetery is still located at this site along Highway 61. The congregation's membership extended from Perryville all the way to the Mississippi River opposite Chester, Illinois. Peace thus became the "mother church" of Immanuel in Perryville, Zion in Crosstown, Zion in Longtown, and a congregation at Point Rest that no longer exists. It also helped Lutherans at Ste. Genevieve organize a congregation 1867.

In 1885, the congregation moved from Frankenberg to Friedenberg and built the present red-brick structure. As the social and economic climate of the area changed, membership began to decline. In 1980, Peace congregation voted to disband. The people resolved to preserve their buildings as a reminder of the heritage of the LCMS and asked the Concordia Historical Institute to take over the property.

== Gallery ==
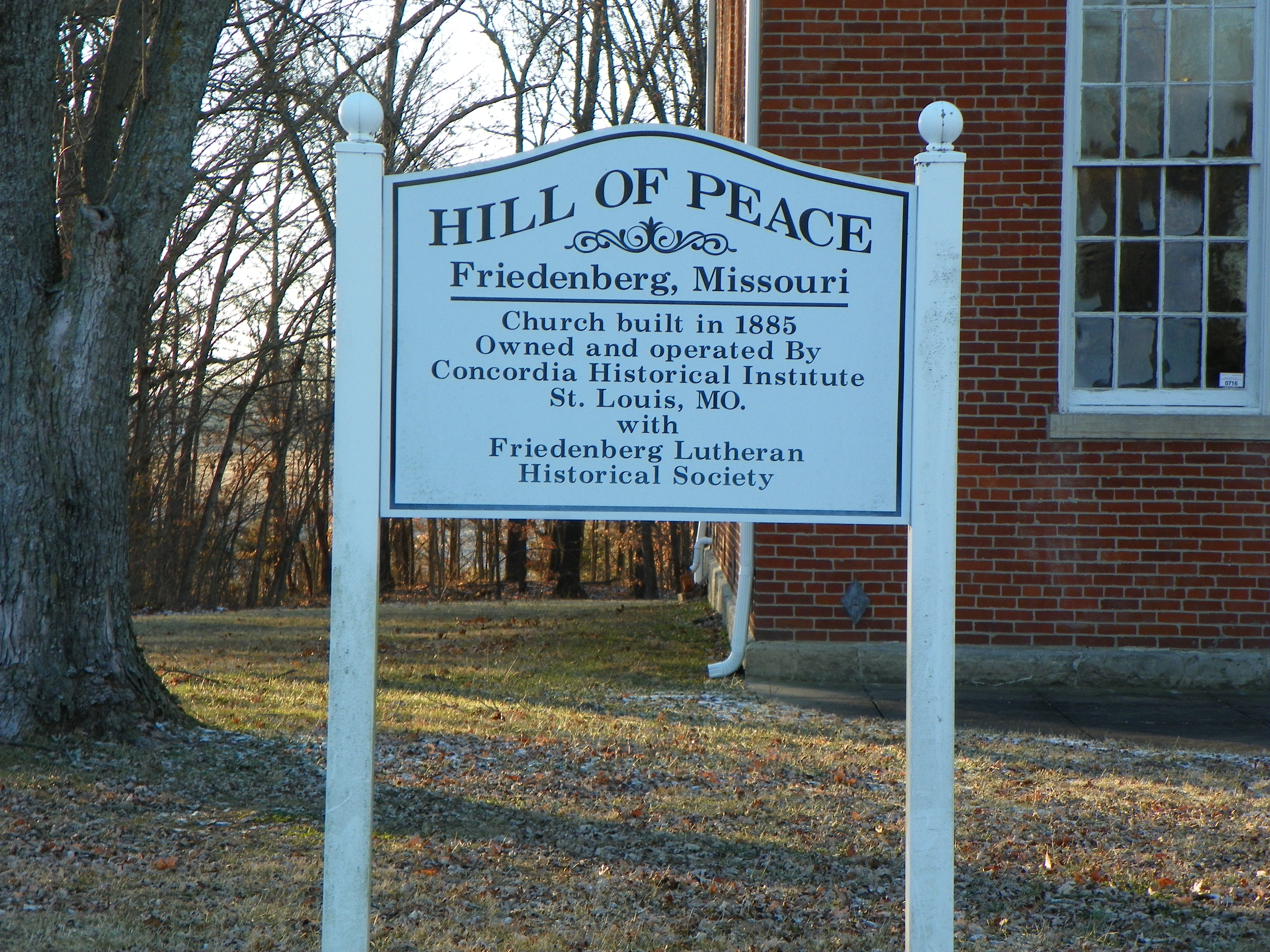
Church Sign

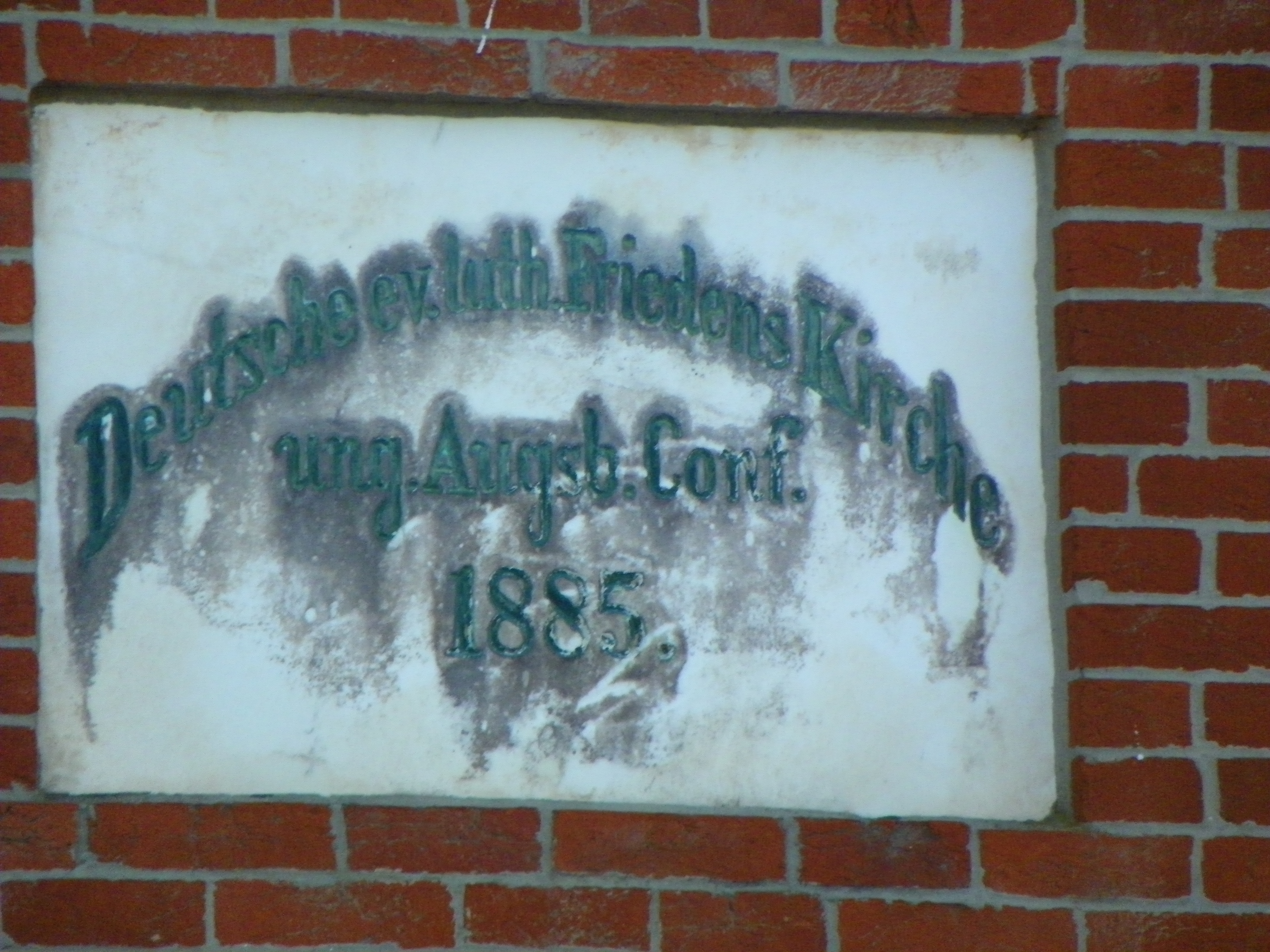
Center Stone

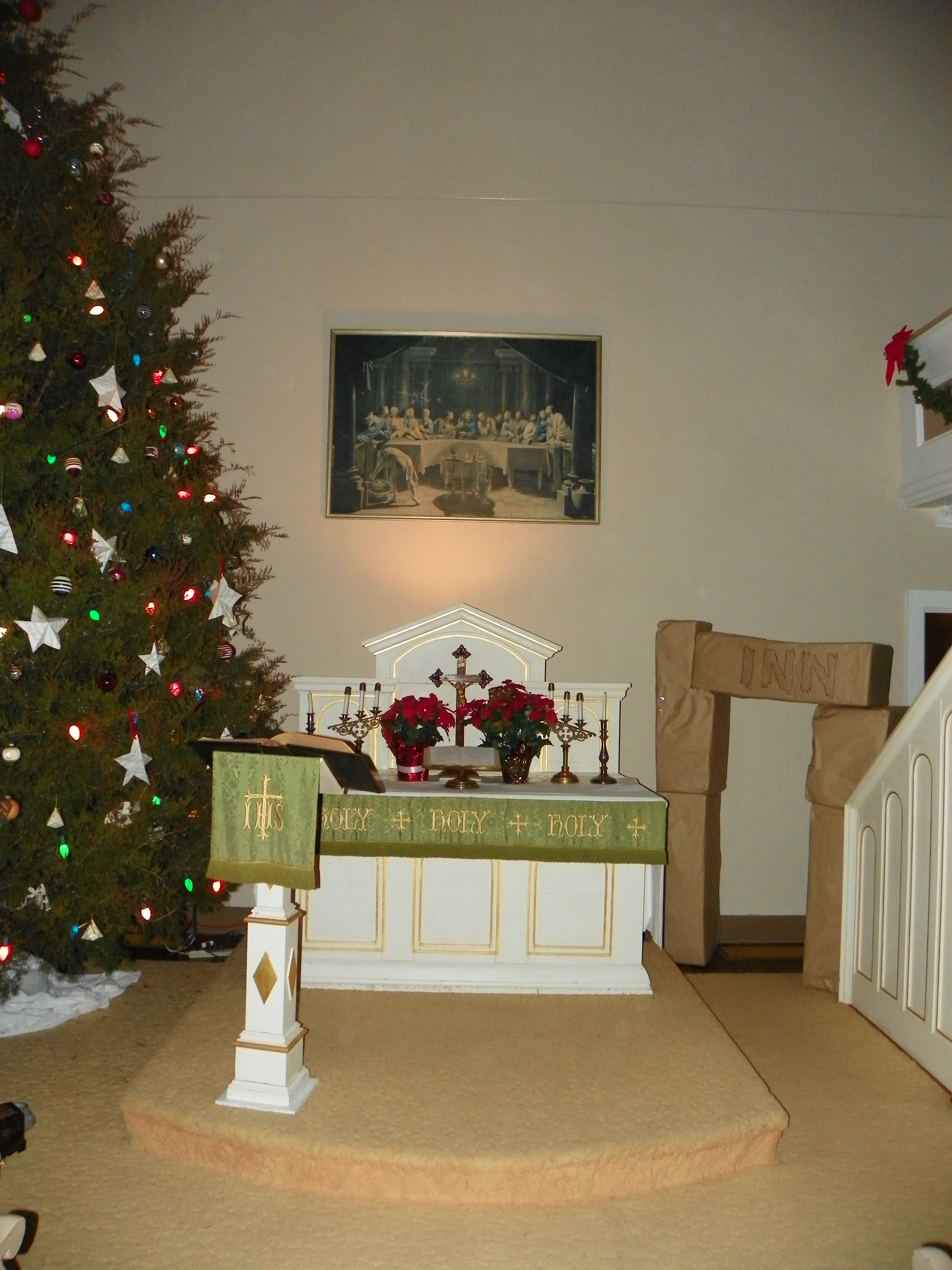
Altar

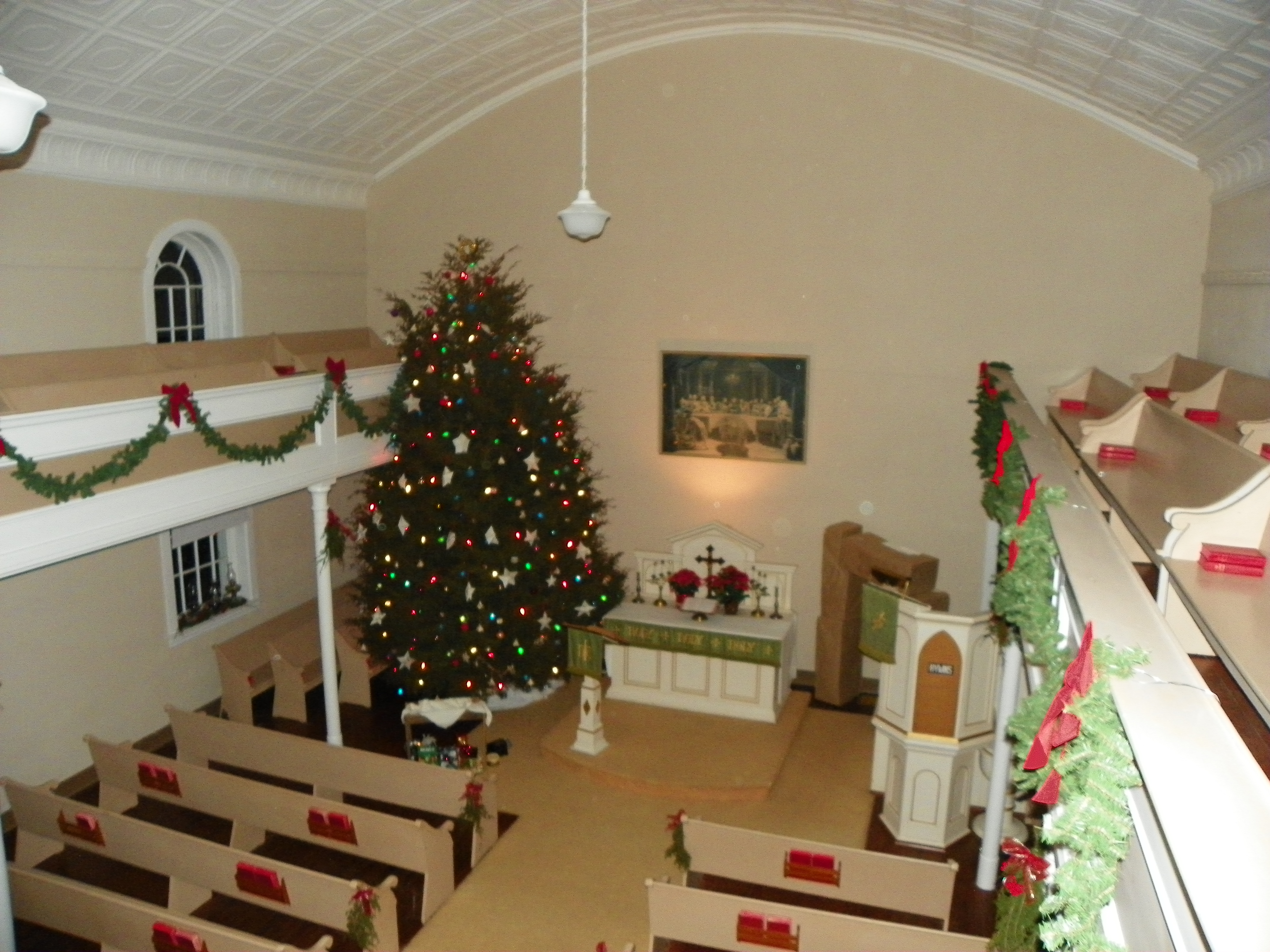
Interior
