= Uniontown, Missouri =

Unincorporated community in Missouri, U.S.

Coordinates: 37°36′53″N 89°42′50″W

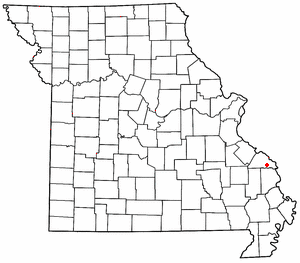

Uniontown is an unincorporated community located in Union Township in southeastern Perry County, Missouri, United States. It is situated on U.S. Route 61, ten miles southeast of Perryville.

== Etymology ==
Uniontown was originally known as Paitzdorf, and was named after the same village in Greiz county in Thuringia, Germany, from where many of the settlers originated. However, Paitzdorf became known as Uniontown during the Civil War era, as it served as an encampment for Union soldiers. The Union soldiers could not pronounce the name of the town, and therefore referred to it as Uniontown.

== History ==
Originally known as Paitzdorf, Uniontown is one of seven towns and villages in the area founded by the Rev. C. F. Gruber Auswanderung (Emigration) Group of Saxon-German immigrants in 1839. Paitzdorf and the others -- Altenburg, Dresden, Frohna, Johannisberg, Seelitz, and Wittenberg—were all named by settlers after towns in the Saxony region of their native country.

== Community ==
Grace Lutheran Church serves the local population and is a member of the Lutheran Church–Missouri Synod.
