= Allen's Landing, Missouri =

Allen’s Landing, Missouri
- unincorporated community
- Location of Perry County, Missouri
- Coordinates: 37°49′42″N 89°43′42″W
- Country: United States
- State: Missouri
- County: Perry
- Township: Bois Brule
- Named for: Thomas Allen
- Elevation: 341 ft (104 m)
- Time zone: UTC-6 (Central (CST))
  - Summer (DST): UTC-5 (CDT)
- ZIP code: 63775
- Area code: 573

Allen's Landing is an unincorporated community in eastern Bois Brule Township in Perry County, Missouri. Thomas Allen, an Irish immigrant, settled here in 1797. A post office was established in 1862 and operated until 1869.
