= Shakertowne, Missouri =

- Census-designated place
- Location within Missouri Location within the United States
- Coordinates: 37°41′38″N 89°52′03″W
- Country: United States
- State: Missouri
- County: Perry
- Townships: Central; Cinque Hommes

Area
  - Total: 1.32 sq mi (3.42 km^{2})
  - Land: 1.32 sq mi (3.42 km^{2})
  - Water: 0 sq mi (0.00 km^{2})
- Elevation: 600 ft (180 m)

Population (2020)
  - Total: 625
  - Density: 473.3/sq mi (182.76/km^{2})
- Time zone: UTC-6 (Central (CST))
  - Summer (DST): UTC-5 (CDT)
- ZIP Code: 63775 (Perryville)
- Area code: 573
- FIPS code: 29-66935
- GNIS feature ID: 2806418

Shakertowne is an unincorporated community and census-designated place (CDP) in Perry County, Missouri, United States. As of the 2020 census, Shakertowne had a population of 625. It is in the central part of the county and is bordered to the north by Perryville, the county seat. Interstate 55 forms the western edge of the CDP; the closest access is from Exit 129 (Missouri Route 51) in Perryville. Via I-55 St. Louis is 84 miles (135 km) to the north and Cape Girardeau is 34 miles (55 km) to the south.

Shakertowne was first listed as a CDP prior to the 2020 census.

== Demographics ==
Historical population
Census	Pop.	Note	%±
2020	625		—
U.S. Decennial Census

Shakertowne first appeared as a census designated place in the 2020 U.S. census.
