= Yount, Missouri =

Unincorporated community in Missouri, U.S.

- unincorporated community
- Location of Perry County, Missouri
- Coordinates: 37°36′19″N 90°02′20″W
- Country: United States
- State: Missouri
- County: Perry
- Township: Saint Mary’s
- Elevation: 623 ft (190 m)
- Time zone: UTC-6 (Central (CST))
  - Summer (DST): UTC-5 (CDT)
- ZIP code: 63775
- Area code: 573
- FIPS code: 29-81394
- GNIS feature ID: 753014

Yount is an unincorporated settlement in Saint Mary's Township in Perry County, Missouri.

== History ==
Yount was established in 1886 as Yount's Store, and was named for Henry Yount, a merchant and storekeeper, as well as a postmaster and county judge. The name was shortened to Yount in 1888. The post office operated in Yount from 1887 until 1954.

Mt. Pisca Lutheran Church was founded in Yount in 1852 and continued until 1868. In that same year, the church became the Mt. Zion Lutheran Church which existed until 1974.

== Geography ==
Yount is located 17 miles (27 km) southwest of Perryville, Missouri.
