= Perry County 32 School District (Missouri) =

School district in Missouri, U.S.

Location
- Perry County, Missouri United States
- Coordinates: 37°43′14″N 89°51′35″W

District information
- Type: Public
- Grades: PreK–12
- Established: 1960s
- Superintendent: Dr. Fara Jones
- Asst. superintendent(s): Craig Hayden
- Chair of the board: Nancy Voelker

Students and staff
- Students: 2,364
- District mascot: Pirate
- Colors: Green, White

Other information
- Website: www.perryville.k12.mo.us

The Perry County 32 School District is located in Perry County, Missouri and the City of Perryville, Missouri. It serves more than 2,300 students.

== History ==
The first public school classes were held in the old Methodist Church in the 1860s. The church was located on the corner of East North and North Spring Streets. The teacher was Patrick Monoghan.

In 1867, the center part of the first public high school building was erected. This building, which consisted of 3 rooms, was located at the corner of Magnolia and West North Streets.

In 1917, a new high school was built next to the existing building, which was then converted to a grade school. This building was used as the high school until 1938.

The high school building located at College and Edwards Streets - now called the Old Senior High School - was completed in 1938, the same year that the Farm Engineer's Building located behind the Old Senior High (which now houses the maintenance department) was built.

From 1960 to 1966, nineteen small school districts within Perry County are annexed into District 32.

In 1975, voters approved a $1.25 million bond issue to build a new high school. The facilities opened in April 1976 and eliminated a number of trailers used as classrooms. The new high school housed English, social studies, math, science and special services rooms. Administrative offices, guidance offices, resource centers, a cafeteria and commons area are also included.

== Schools ==
=== High schools ===
- Perryville High School (09–12)
- Perryville Area Career & Technology Center (09–12)

=== Middle schools ===
- Perry County Middle School (06–08)

=== Elementary schools ===
- Perryville Early Childhood Special Education Center (PK)
- Perryville Elementary School (K-05)
