= York Chapel United Methodist Church (Longtown, Missouri) =

York Chapel United Methodist Church, Longtown, Missouri
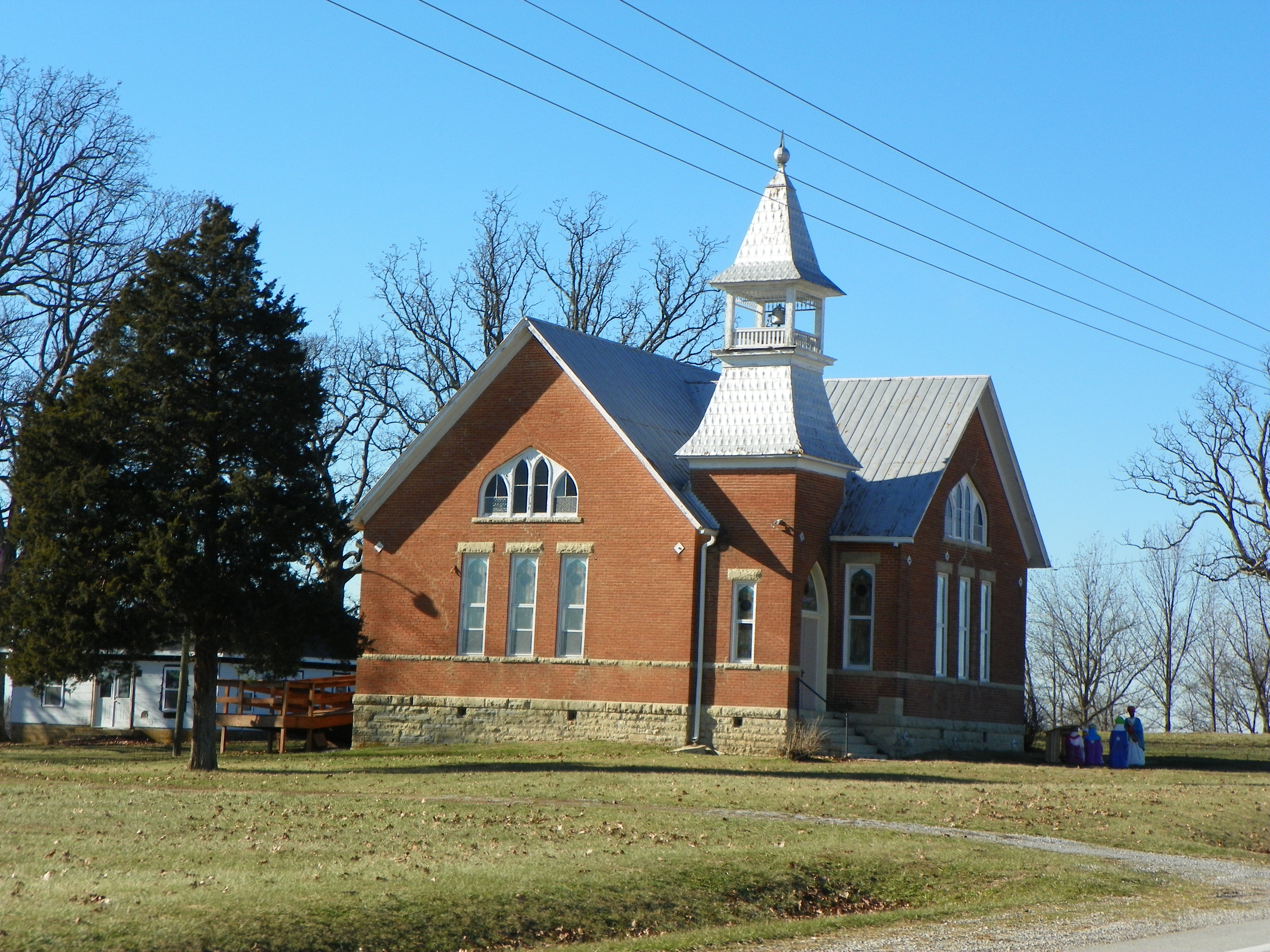

- Location within Missouri
- 37°40′44.19″N 89°47′27.37″W
- Location: 5455 South Hwy 61, Longtown, Missouri 63775
- Country: United States
- Denomination: United Methodist Church

History
- Founded: 1826
- Dedicated: 1914

Architecture
- Heritage designation: 729203

York Chapel is a former United Methodist Church in Longtown, Missouri.

== Name ==
York Chapel took its name from one of the earliest circuit riders of this district.

== History ==
In 1821, a colony came to what is now York Chapel Community. The Abernathys, Farrars, Rutledges and Burns were among the first pioneers. The religious leader serving the colony was Jones Abernathy. The church is the second oldest Methodist organization in the Louisiana Purchase.

In 1826, the first church, a log church, was built on the right side of the cemetery. The first church also served as a school for the congregation’s children.

On the 5th day of September, 1837, George Rutledge, deeded 40 acres to Jeremiah Abernathy, William Farrar, George Rutledge, Lot Abernathy, John N. Abernathy, James Burns, and Alonzo Abernathy, for the purpose of building a church for the members of the Methodist Episcopal Church. Ezekiel Foster also deeded 4 acres, while John H. Abernathy deeded one acre.

The congregation decided to replace the log church with a more permanent structure, and in 1843 the construction on the ‘Rock Church’ was begun, with its name deriving from the limestone used to build the structure.

In 1844, construction on the Rock Church was finished, and the congregation continued to worship there for 70 years until 1914 when a new structure of brick and stone was erected near the spot of the old camp-meeting tabernacle. The present brick and stone church building was dedicated by Reverend W. F. McMurry.
