= Brewer, Missouri =

- Unincorporated community and census-designated place
- Location of Perry County
- Coordinates: 37°46′51″N 89°55′31″W
- Country: United States
- State: Missouri
- County: Perry
- Township: Saline

Area
  - Total: 2.34 sq mi (6.06 km^{2})
  - Land: 2.34 sq mi (6.06 km^{2})
  - Water: 0 sq mi (0.00 km^{2})
- Elevation: 584 ft (178 m)

Population (2020)
  - Total: 361
  - Density: 154.3/sq mi (59.58/km^{2})
- Time zone: UTC-6 (Central (CST))
  - Summer (DST): UTC-5 (CDT)
- ZIP code: 63775
- Area code: 573
- FIPS code: 29-08272
- GNIS feature ID: 714672

Brewer is an unincorporated community and census-designated place in Saline Township, Perry County, Missouri, United States, which is located northwest of Perryville.

As of the 2020 census, Brewer had a population of 361.

== History ==
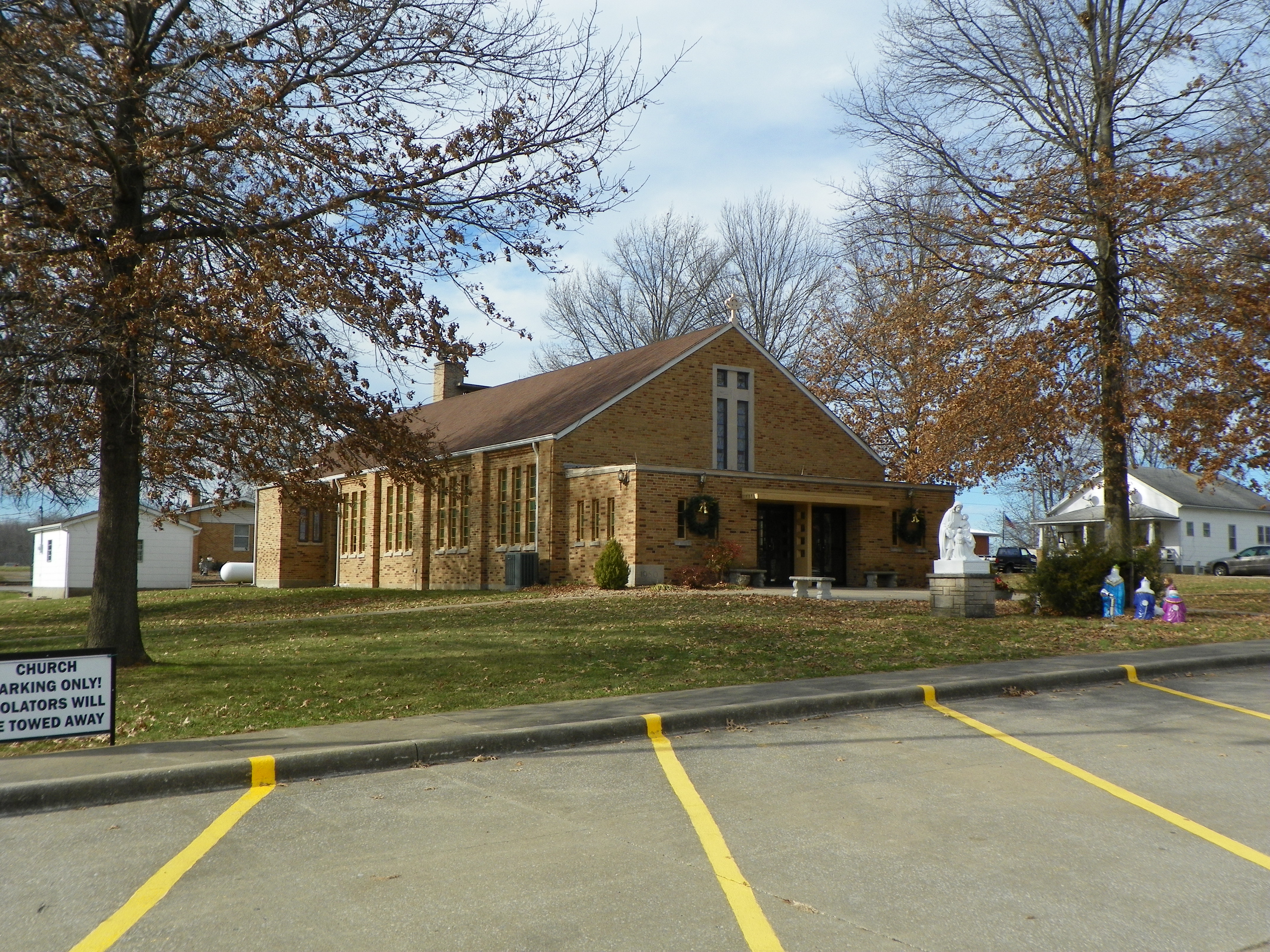
Christ the Savior Catholic Church

Brewer was named for R. M. Brewer. The Brewer family, originally hailing from Maryland, had settled in Spencer County, Kentucky, before eventually coming to Missouri.

The town was unofficially known as Brewerville before the post office was christened Brewer in 1886.

== Demographics ==
Historical population
Census	Pop.	Note	%±
2020	361		—
U.S. Decennial Census
