= Saint Mary's Township, Perry County, Missouri =

Township in the US state of Missouri

St. Marys Township, Missouri
- Civil Township
- Location of Perry County
- Coordinates: 37°40′24″N 90°01′40″W
- Country: United States
- State: Missouri
- County: Perry
- Established

Area
  - Total: 103 sq mi (270 km^{2})
  - Land: 102 sq mi (260 km^{2})
  - Water: 0.27 sq mi (0.7 km^{2})
- GNIS Feature ID: 767155

Saint Mary's Township or St. Mary's Township is one of the eight townships located in Perry County, Missouri, in the United States of America.

== Name ==
Saint Mary's Township was most likely given the name by Catholic members of the community who worshipped at St. Mary's-of-the-Barrens Church. The name Saint Mary's may be further connected to Catholic Kentucky settlers who originated in St. Mary's County, Maryland.

== History ==
Saint Mary's Township lies in the southwestern part of Perry County. It was organized between 1850 and 1860.

== Geography ==
Saint Mary's is situated in the southwestern corner of Perry County. There are three unincorporated communities in Saint Mary's Township: Barks, Silver Lake and Yount.

== Demographics ==
=== 2000 census ===
As of the census of 2000, there were 1,681 people living in the township. The racial makeup of the town was 98.6% White, 0.4% American Indian and Alaska Native, and 0.5% from other races.

=== 2010 census ===
As of the census of 2010, there were 1,708 people, with a density of 16.7 per square mile (6.5 km2), residing in the township. The population density was 25 people per square mile. The racial makeup of the town was 98.24% White, 0.53% American Indian and Alaska Native, and 0.88% from other races.
