= Pointrest, Missouri =

- Abandoned village
- Location of Perry County, Missouri
- Coordinates: 37°49′00″N 89°42′47″W
- Country: United States
- State: Missouri
- County: Perry
- Township: Bois Brule

Pointrest was an unincorporated community in Bois Brule Township in Perry County, Missouri, United States.

== History ==
Point Rest was originally called Point Rest Landing and was the site of a river landing along the Mississippi. The town had a church - Trinity Lutheran Church, and also had a general store - the Wichern Store. The community suffered a number of floods over the years, especially in 1927. With the growth of rail transportation and the decline of river traffic, along with numerous floods over the years, the community slowly withered and died. Today, nothing remains of the former community, and all that can be seen is farmland.

== Geography ==
Pointrest was situated in the eastern corner of Perry County, on the Mississippi River within the Bois Brule Bottom levee. A post office was established in 1892. The name was written Point Rest until 1895. The "point" is a rocky ledge or point sticking into the Mississippi River.

== Gallery ==
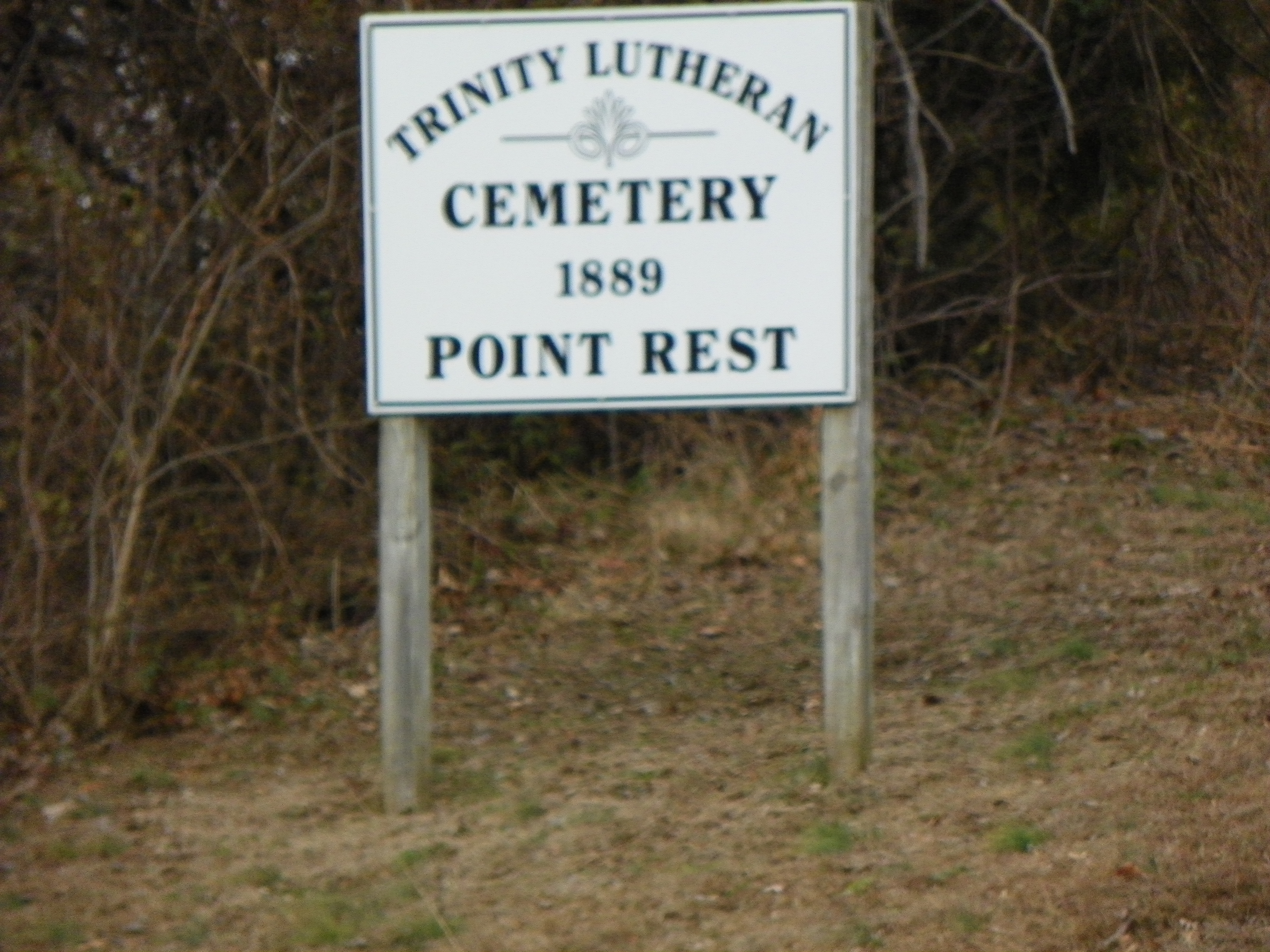
Present town cemetery

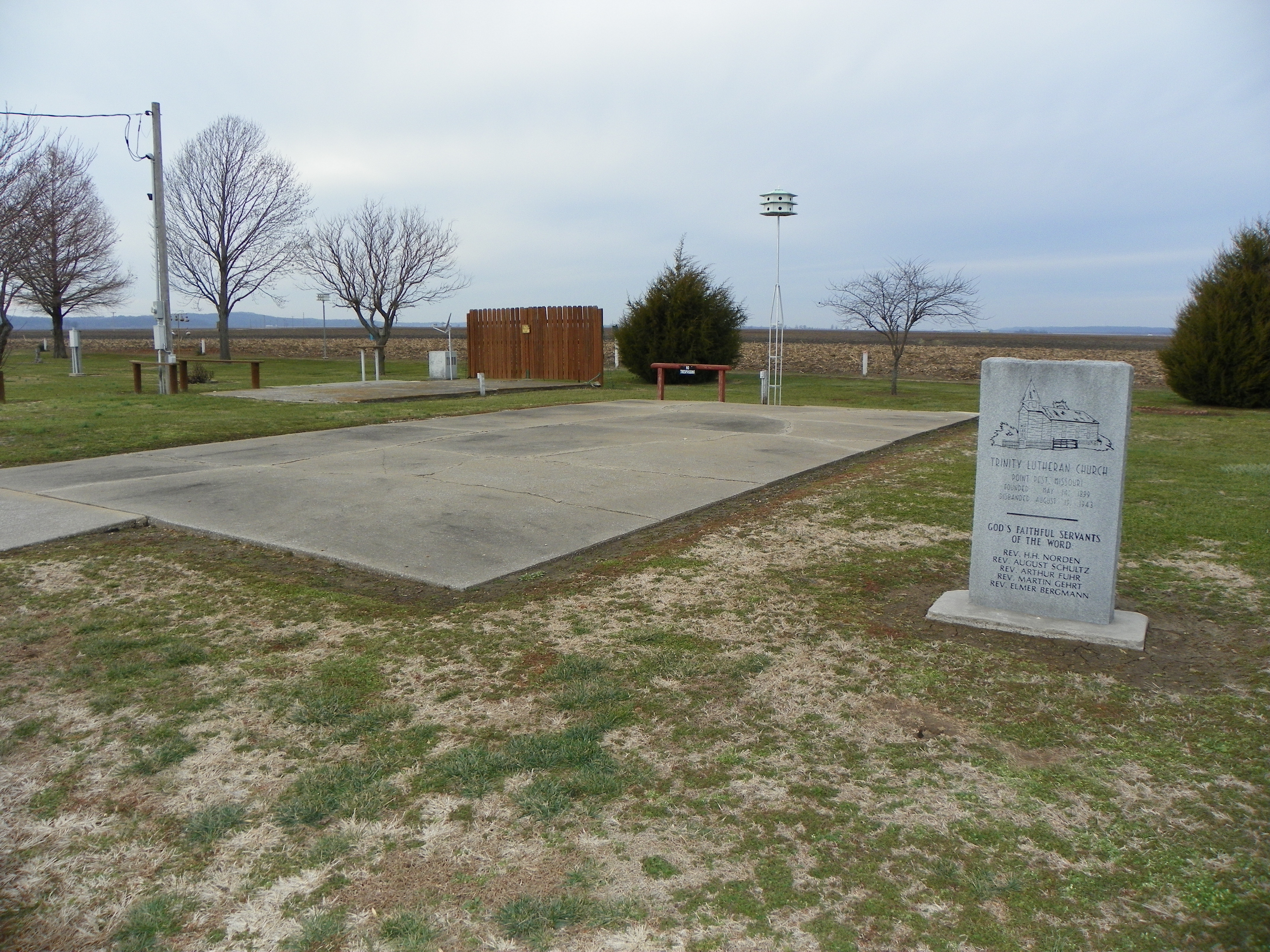
Town and church marker

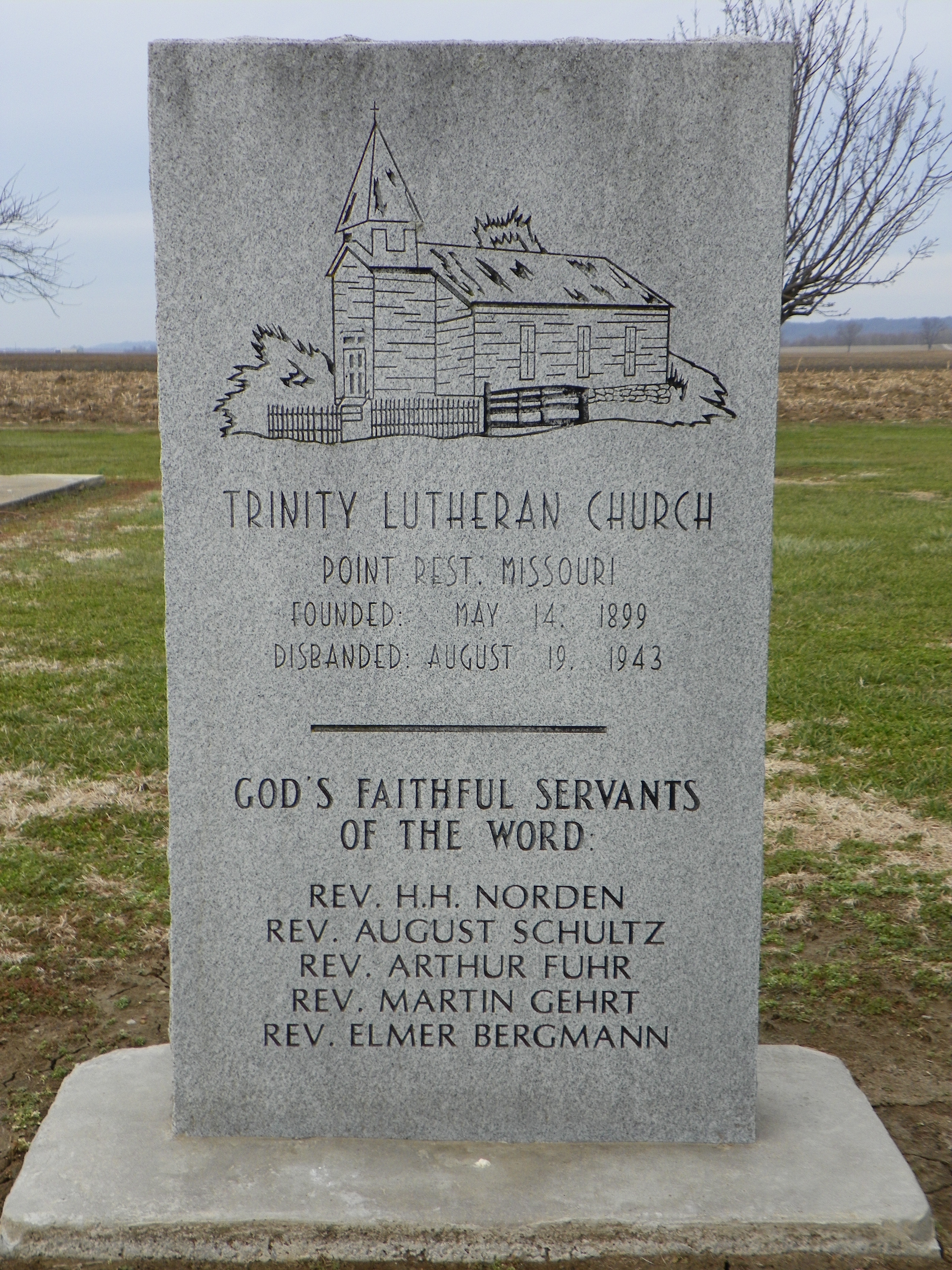
Marker
