= Friedenberg, Missouri =

Unincorporated community in Missouri, U.S.

- Unincorporated community
- Location of Perry County, Missouri
- Coordinates: 37°42′03″N 89°47′38″W
- Country: United States
- State: Missouri
- County: Perry
- Township: Central
- Elevation: 551 ft (168 m)
- Time zone: UTC-6 (Central (CST))
  - Summer (DST): UTC-5 (CDT)
- ZIP code: 63775
- Area code: 573
- FIPS code: 29-25995
- GNIS feature ID: 740859

Friedenberg is an unincorporated community in Central Township in Perry County, Missouri, United States.

== Name ==
The Bavarians who settled just outside Perryville, Missouri in the 1830s felt so strongly about the importance of peace that they named their town “Friedenberg” (German: Hill of Peace). An old nickname for Friedenberg is “Raccoon Ridge”.

== History ==
Unlike the communities of Altenburg, Frohna, and Uniontown that were settled by Saxon Lutherans from Germany, Friedenberg was founded in 1838 by Lutheran immigrants from Bavaria, Germany. These Bavarians came from the Upper Franconian region, some from the city of Langenstadt near present-day Kulmbach. They worshiped in members’ homes until a log church was built in 1846 north of Cinque Hommes Creek. From 1852 until 1885 the congregation worshiped at their church on Frankenberg overlooking the Cinque Hommes Bottoms. In 1885 the congregation moved to its present site in Friedenberg and built a brick church. Peace Lutheran Church disbanded in 1980.
