= Zion Lutheran Church (Longtown, Missouri) =

Zion Lutheran Church, Longtown, Missouri
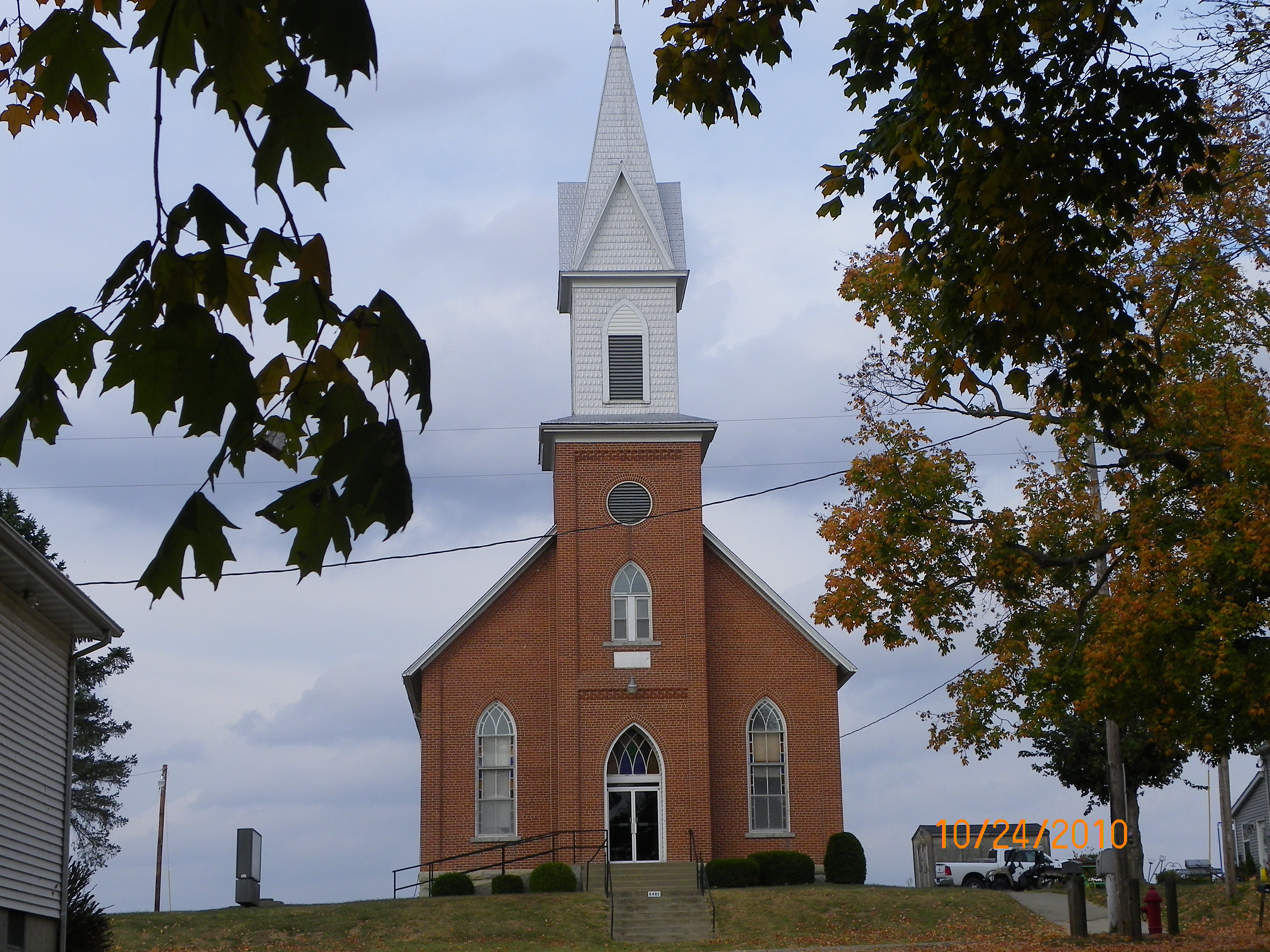

- Location within Missouri
- 37°40′12″N 89°46′25″W
- Location: 6483 S Highway 61, Longtown, Missouri 63775
- Country: United States
- Denomination: Lutheran Church–Missouri Synod

History
- Former name(s): Zion Evangelical Lutheran Church (Longtown, Missouri)
- Founded: July 19, 1897
- Dedicated: November 3, 1912

Architecture
- Construction cost: $8,000 (1912 dollars)

Administration
- District: Missouri District

Zion Lutheran Church is an LCMS (Lutheran Church–Missouri Synod) church in Longtown, Missouri.

== Name ==
The original name, Zion Evangelical Lutheran Church of Longtown, followed the German tradition of using the word “Evangelical”, meaning ‘Protestant’, as part of the name.

== History ==
On July 19, 1897 a group of men form Peace Lutheran Church of Friedenberg, Missouri, met in the home of Fred Schade for the purpose of organizing a congregation. Peace Lutheran Congregation in Friedenberg maintained a Christian day school for all of their children. The children of the families living in Longtown and vicinity walked every day to the school in Friedenberg. During the winter months and early spring the roads often became impassable. Due to the distance and high absence of Longtown pupils during times of bad weather, it was decided to establish a new congregation in Longtown.

Under the leadership of Reverend O. R Hueschen of Uniontown, the founding members adopted a constitution and decided upon the name of ‘Zion Evangelical Lutheran Church of Longtown’. Fifteen members signed the church's constitution. At first, Devine Services were held in a building that had originally served as a Baptist church. Hueschen served as a temporary pastor until the new congregation's first pastor, G. D. Hamm, was installed on September 12, 1897. The congregation grew in the first year to 133 members.

The cornerstone of a new brick building was laid on June 23, 1912, with the church being dedicated on November 3, 1912. The church came at a cost of $8,000. The building was 42 feet by 70 feet, and included in the cost were the altar pulpit baptismal font, bell, pews and furnace.

A Wicks organ was installed in 1941 at a cost of $1,600, with $1,145 of the funds being contributed by the Ladies Aid group.

== Parish ==
Since August 11, 1963, Grace has been a member of a Dual-Parish formed with Zion-Longtown. The pastor's parsonage is located in Uniontown. A new parish hall was constructed on December 6, 1964. The current pastor of the joint parish is Pastor Paul Winningham.

== Gallery ==
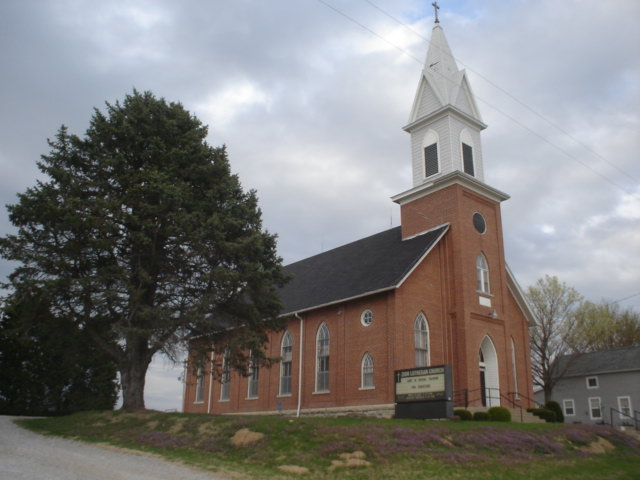
Zion Lutheran Church

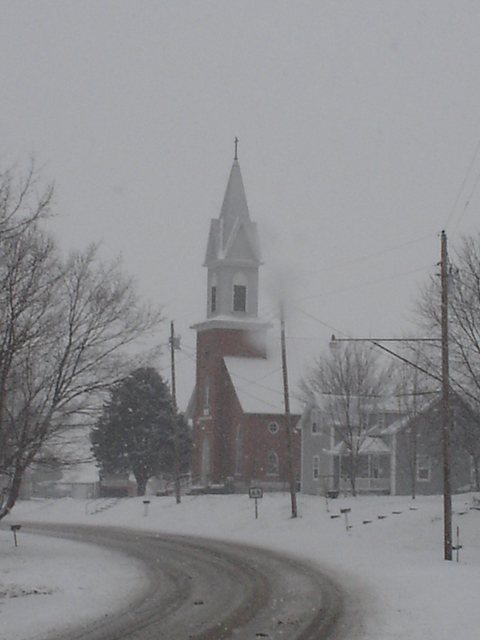
Winter snow

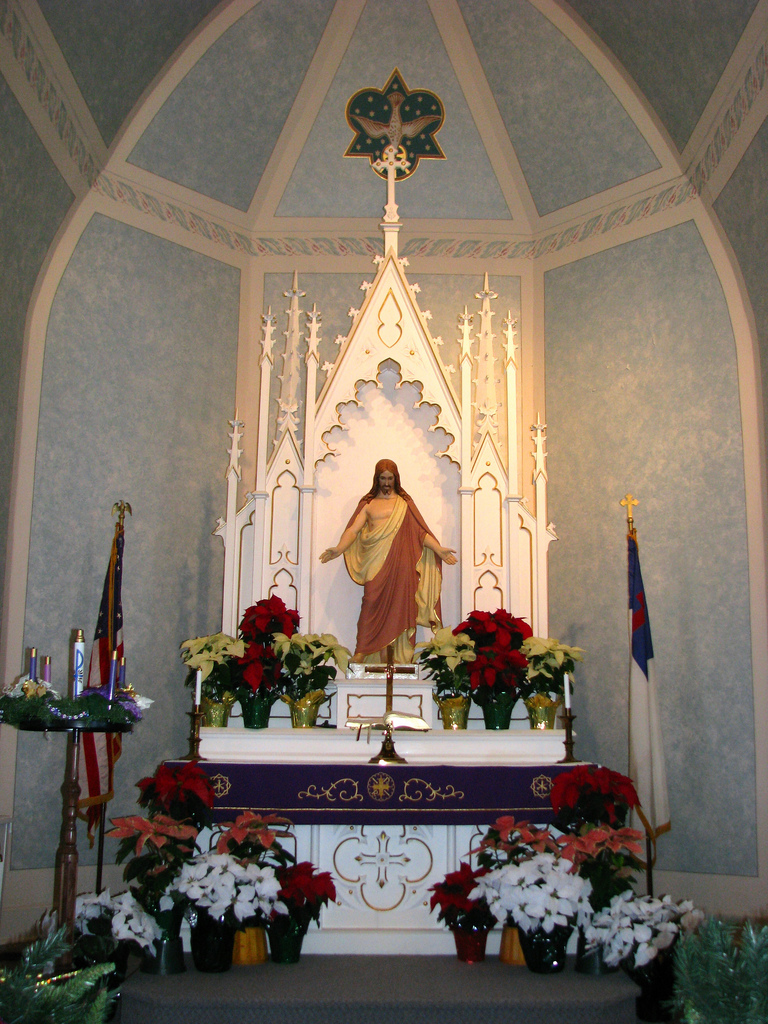
Altar
