= Dresden, Missouri =

Unincorporated community in Pettis County, Missouri, United States

- Unincorporated community
- Interactive map of Dresden, Missouri
- Coordinates: 38°45′04″N 93°20′06″W
- Country: United States
- State: Missouri
- County: Pettis
- Elevation: 827 ft (252 m)
- Time zone: UTC-6 (Central (CST))
  - Summer (DST): UTC-5 (CDT)
- GNIS feature ID: 717048

Dresden (also Dresdon) is an unincorporated community in Pettis County, Missouri, United States.

== History ==
A post office called Dresden was established in 1863 and remained in operation until 1954. The community was named after Dresden, Germany. Dresden was once an incorporated town.
