= Saline Township, Perry County, Missouri =

Township in the US state of Missouri

Saline Township, Missouri
- Civil Township
- Location of Perry County
- Coordinates: 37°49′02″N 89°56′06″W
- Country: United States
- State: Missouri
- County: Perry
- Established: Places of the USA: Bois Brule Township

Area
  - Total: 46 sq mi (119 km^{2})
  - Land: 46 sq mi (118 km^{2})
  - Water: 0.39 sq mi (1 km^{2}) 0.84%
- GNIS Feature ID: 767157

Saline Township is one of the eight townships located in Perry County, Missouri, in the United States of America.

== Name ==
Saline Township was named for Saline Creek, which flows through the township. The creek's name comes from two natural salt springs which were used as a source of salt for Native American tribes and early French colonial settlers.

== History ==
Saline Township is situated in the northwestern part of Perry County. It was organized between 1850 and 1860. There is one village in Saline Township: Lithium, and one CDP: Brewer.

== Demographics ==
=== 2010 Census ===
As of the census of 2010, there were 1,610 people living in the township. The racial makeup of the township was 98.8% White, 0.1% American Indian and Alaska Native, 0.3% Asian, 0.5% from other races. There are 36 people per square mile (population density). The median age is 39.5. The US median is 37.3. 63.43% of people in Saline Township are married. 10.70% are divorced.

The average household size is 2.67 people. 34.14% of people are married, with children. 9.41% have children, but are single.

== Other Saline Townships ==
The Geographic Names Information System (GNIS) lists five Saline Townships in various counties of Missouri.
