= Shawnee Township, Cape Girardeau County, Missouri =

Township in the U.S. state of Missouri

Shawnee Township
- Township
- Coordinates: 37°30′54″N 089°36′51″W
- Country: United States
- State: Missouri
- County: Cape Girardeau

Area
  - Total: 92.36 sq mi (239.21 km^{2})
  - Land: 90.37 sq mi (234.05 km^{2})
  - Water: 1.99 sq mi (5.16 km^{2}) 2.16%
- Elevation: 560 ft (170 m)

Population (2000)
  - Total: 3,460
  - Density: 38/sq mi (14.8/km^{2})
- FIPS code: 29-67070
- GNIS feature ID: 0766402

Shawnee Township is one of ten townships in Cape Girardeau County, Missouri, USA. As of the 2000 census, its population was 3,460. It contains the census-designated place of Shawneetown.

Shawnee Township was established in 1848, and named after the Shawnee Indians.

== Geography ==
Shawnee Township covers an area of 92.36 square miles (239.2 km^{2}) and contains one incorporated settlement, Pocahontas. Known cemeteries include Apple Creek (near Apple Creek Presbyterian in Pocahontas), Bennett, Born, Draby, Fleming, Grammer, Hays/Cotter/Bray, High Hill Church, Kiennenger, Kirby/McCain, Klosterman, Ludwig/New Jerusalem, McLain’s Chapel/Indian Creek, Miller at Fruitland, Neely’s Landing, New Bethel Baptist (at Pocahontas), New New Wells, Pleasant Hill, Princess Otakhi’s grave, St. John’s Lutheran Church old and new at New Wells, St. John’s at Pocahontas, Shiloh, Trinity Lutheran at Shawneetown, Zion Lutheran at Pocahontas.

The streams of Blue Shawnee Creek, Buckeye Creek, Duskin Creek, Flatrock Creek, Indian Creek, Little Indian Creek, Lovejoy Creek, Muddy Shawnee Creek, Neelys Creek, Opossum Creek, Shawnee Creek and Turkey Creek run through this township.
