= Schumer Springs, Missouri =

Unincorporated community in Missouri, U.S.

- unincorporated community
- Location of Perry County, Missouri
- Coordinates: 37°36′10″N 89°52′38″W
- Country: United States
- State: Missouri
- County: Perry
- Township: Cinque Hommes
- Elevation: 614 ft (187 m)
- Time zone: UTC-6 (Central (CST))
  - Summer (DST): UTC-5 (CDT)
- ZIP code: 63775
- Area code: 573
- GNIS feature ID: 726126

Schumer Springs is an unincorporated community in southern Cinque Hommes Township in Perry County, Missouri, United States.

== History ==
Schumer Springs is located near a natural mineral spring. The community was presumably named for the spring as well as local proprietors of the spring, namely Henry J. Schumer, a farmer, who lived near Biehle, and Frank P. Schuemer, a miller, who lived in nearby Millheim in 1873. The spring is a rare variety known as an ebb-and-flow spring, and its output varies rhythmically and independently of external moisture conditions. Hydrologists with the Missouri Geological Survey measured the spring's flow in 1963 through 1965 and determined its flow to be at between 6,000 and 258,000 gallons per day. Six men from Jackson, Missouri incorporated a company on September 29, 1905, to establish a mineral bath spa with the intention that the resort might one day become as famous as Hot Springs, Arkansas. They purchased 147 acres and hired civil engineer J.W. Bain to lay the tract into lots. The resort faced financial difficulties within a few years of opening and the account book for the hotel showed operations were in the red despite respectable occupancy. By the time of the Great Depression, much of the town had shut down. A post office was established there in 1908.
