= Flat Rock =

Flat Rock may refer to:

== Australia ==
- Flat Rock or Collins Rock, a low point in Woonona, New South Wales

== United States ==
- Flat Rock, Alabama
- Flat Rock, Georgia
- Flat Rock (Columbus, Georgia), a residential neighborhood in Columbus, Georgia
- Flat Rock, Idaho (also known as Macks Inn)
- Flat Rock, Illinois
- Flat Rock, Indiana, in Shelby County
- Flat Rock Township, Bartholomew County, Indiana
- Flat Rock, Kentucky
- Flat Rock, Michigan, a city
- Flat Rock, Delta County, Michigan, an unincorporated community
- Flat Rock, Surry County, North Carolina
- Flat Rock, Henderson County, North Carolina
- Flat Rock, Stokes County, North Carolina
- Flat Rock, Ohio
- Flat Rock, Virginia
- Flat Rock (Kenbridge, Virginia), a historic plantation house in Lunenburg County, Virginia

== See also ==
- Flat Rock Brook Nature Center, New Jersey
- Flatrock (disambiguation)
