= Buckeye Creek (Apple Creek tributary) =

Stream in the U.S. state of Missouri

Buckeye Creek is a stream in northern Cape Girardeau County in the U.S. state of Missouri. It is a tributary of Apple Creek.

The stream headwaters arise just west of I-55 and south of Missouri Route E approximately two miles east of Oak Ridge (at 37°29′50″N 89°41′29″W) at an elevation of 600 feet. The stream flows north to northeast passing under I-55 and U.S. Route 61 west of Shawneetown. Its confluence with Apple Creek is approximately two miles east of Old Appleton (at 37°35′00″N 89°40′19″W) at an elevation of 361 feet.

Buckeye Creek was named for the buckeye trees lining its course.

== See also ==
- List of rivers of Missouri
