= St. John's Evangelical Lutheran Church (Pocahontas, Missouri) =

Church in Missouri, United States

St. John's Lutheran Church, Pocahontas, Missouri
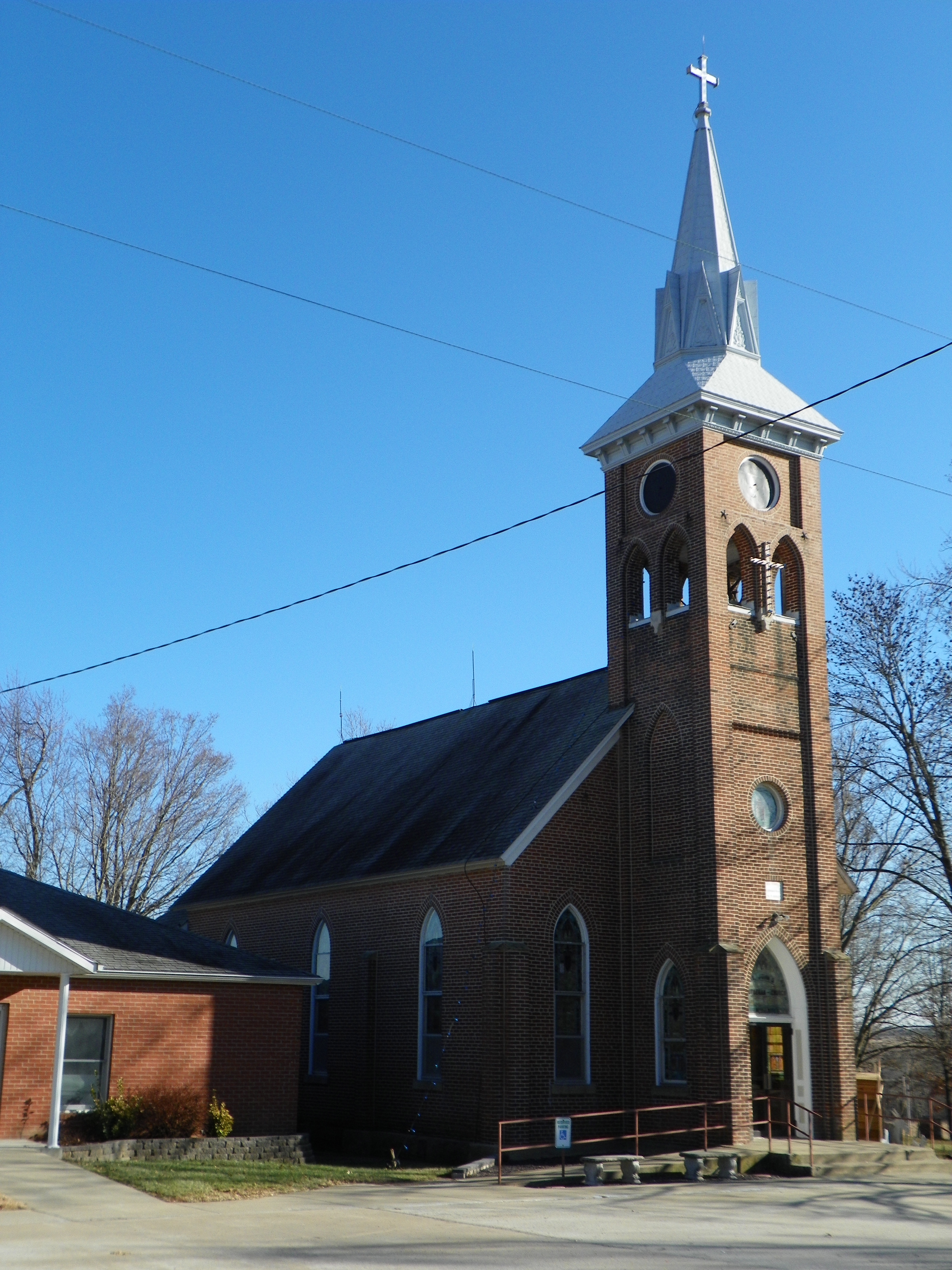

- Location within Missouri
- 37°30′05″N 89°38′17″W
- Location: 159 Little Street, Pocahontas, Missouri 63779
- Country: United States
- Denomination: American Association of Lutheran Churches

History
- Founded: 1867
- Founder: Pastor Fickensher

Clergy
- Pastor: Rev. Dr. Curtis E. Leins

St. John's Lutheran Church is a member congregation of the American Association of Lutheran Churches (AALC) in Pocahontas, Missouri.

== History ==
In 1858, German and Austrian settlers began settling the area around Pocahontas, Missouri. At first, the congregation attended services at Immanuel Lutheran Church in New Wells, nearly 8 miles (13 km) away. Then, after repeated requests to New Wells for a school to be built in Pocahontas, only to be denied, the group decided to leave Immanuel Lutheran and establish their own church and school. In 1867, St. John’s Church was founded. In that first year the congregation was served by pastor Fickensher who was serving in Altenburg at the time. Fickensher organized worship in the homes of the congregation.

In 1870, a plot of land was bought for $365 and a church was built, and the church got its first pastor, Joseph Westernberger, who also ran the parochial school. In 1871, the congregation joined the Iowa Synod. A new brick church was built in 1893, but in May 1910, lightning struck the edifice resulting in fire gutting the building. The furnishings were saved before the church was completely burnt, leaving only the blackened brick walls. In fall of 1910, a new brick church was built and a clock was installed in the spire. A Lutheran parochial school provided education to the congregation’s children. In 1895, a new school was built, and in 1903, a new parsonage was built.

The liturgy has been held in English since 1929. St. John’s is a former member of the Evangelical Lutheran Church in America (ELCA). However, as a result of the fallout over the ELCA’s 2009 Churchwide Assembly decisions, the congregation voted to leave the ELCA. St. John’s then joined the AALC on November 28, 2010.

== Membership ==
St. John's began as a member of the Iowa Synod after repeated petitions to the Missouri Synod failed to result in the establishment of a congregation and school in Pocahontas. The Iowa Synod was later subsumed into the American Lutheran Church (ALC) by a merger with the Buffalo and Ohio synods in 1930. St. John's followed the ALC into its merger with the Lutheran Church in America (LCA), along with the much smaller Association of Evangelical Lutheran Churches (AELC) in 1988 to become members of the Evangelical Lutheran Church of America. In August 2009, the ELCA's Churchwide Assembly (CWA) convened in Minneapolis, Minnesota. At issue were a number of controversial proposals including same-gender sexual relationships and full communion with the United Methodist Church. This led many congregations, including St. John's, to vote on whether to remain in the ELCA or to leave. St. John's left the ELCA and joined the American Association of Lutheran Churches in 2010.

== Gallery ==
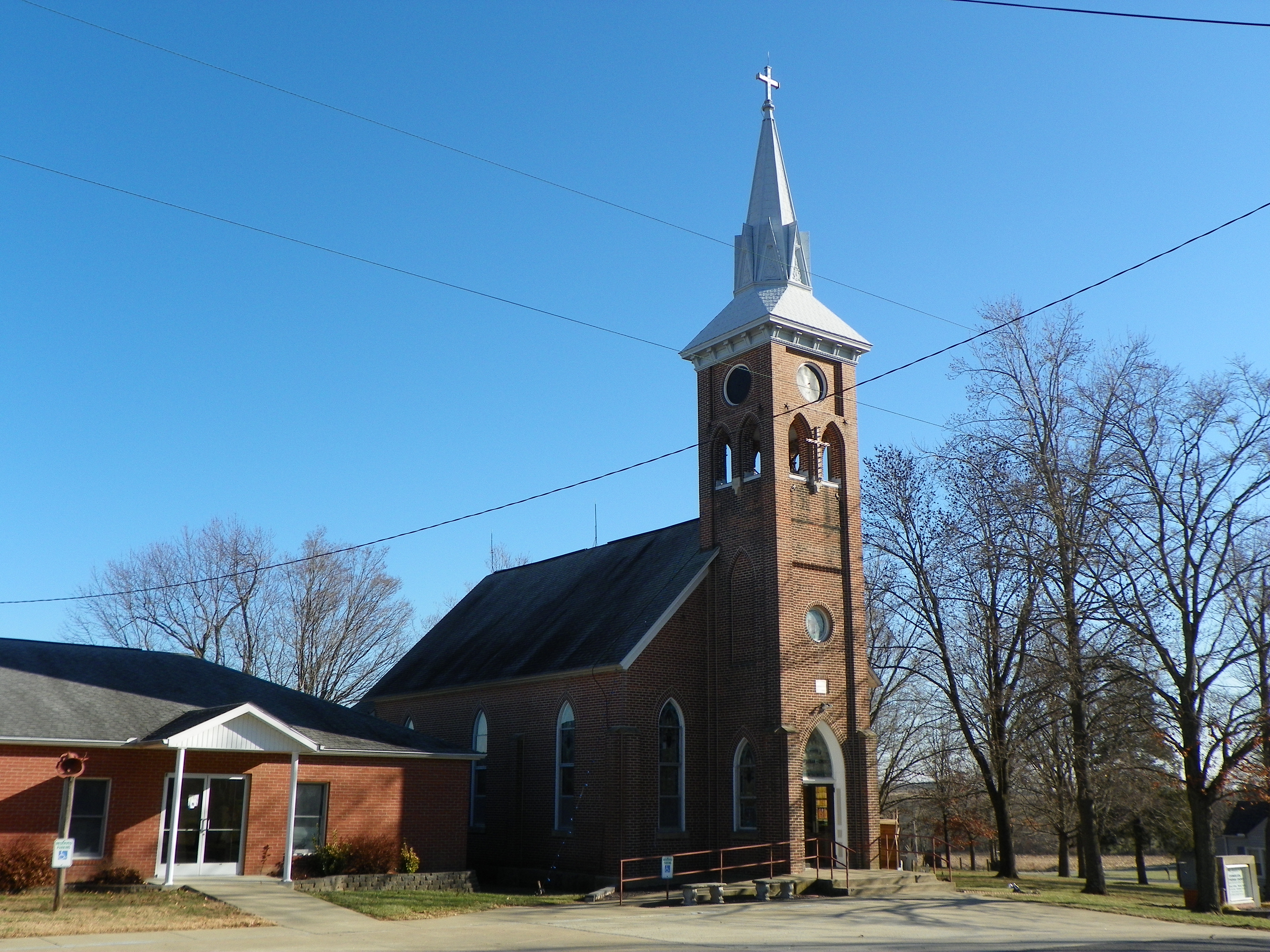
St. John church with school

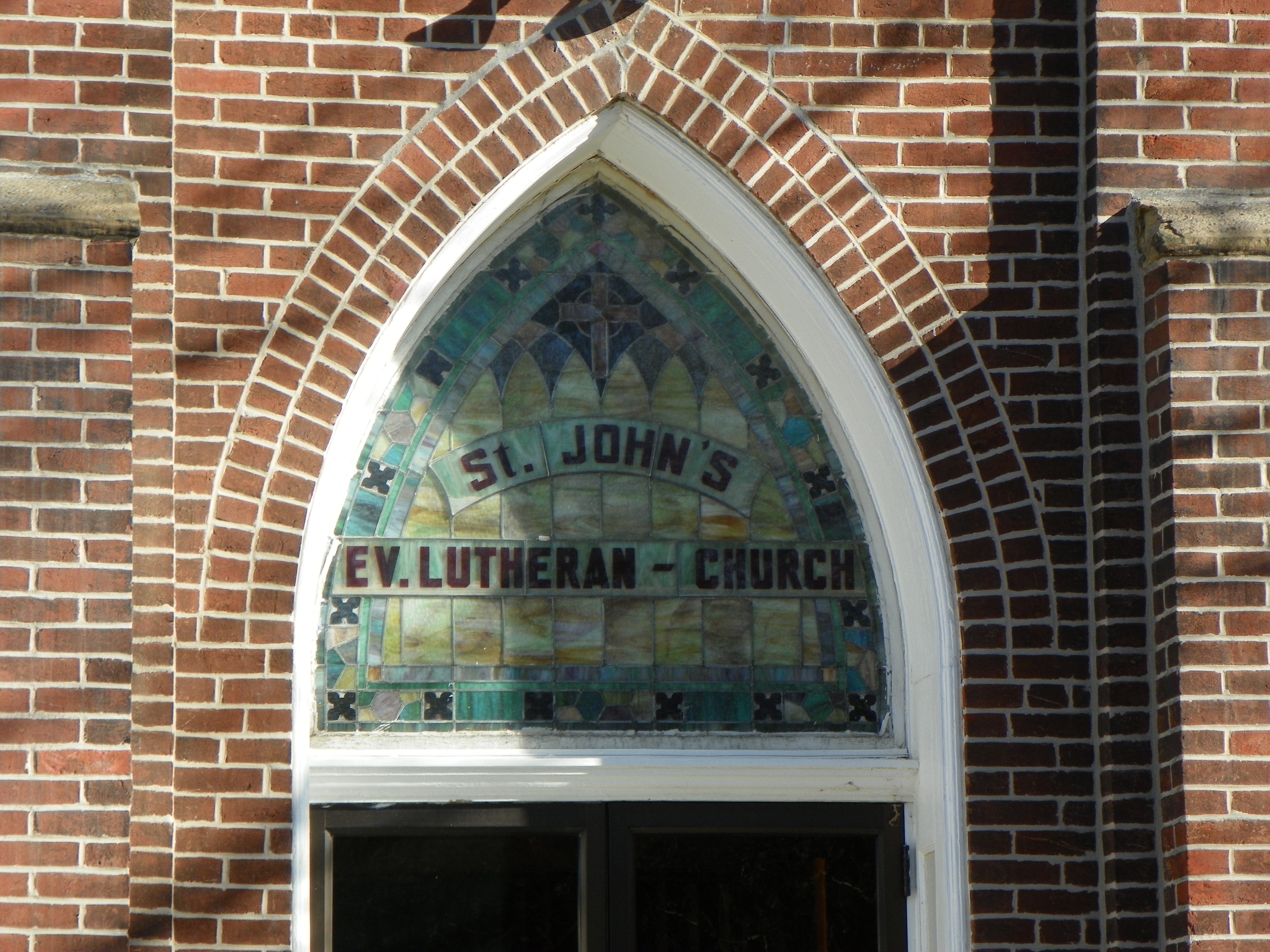
St. John door

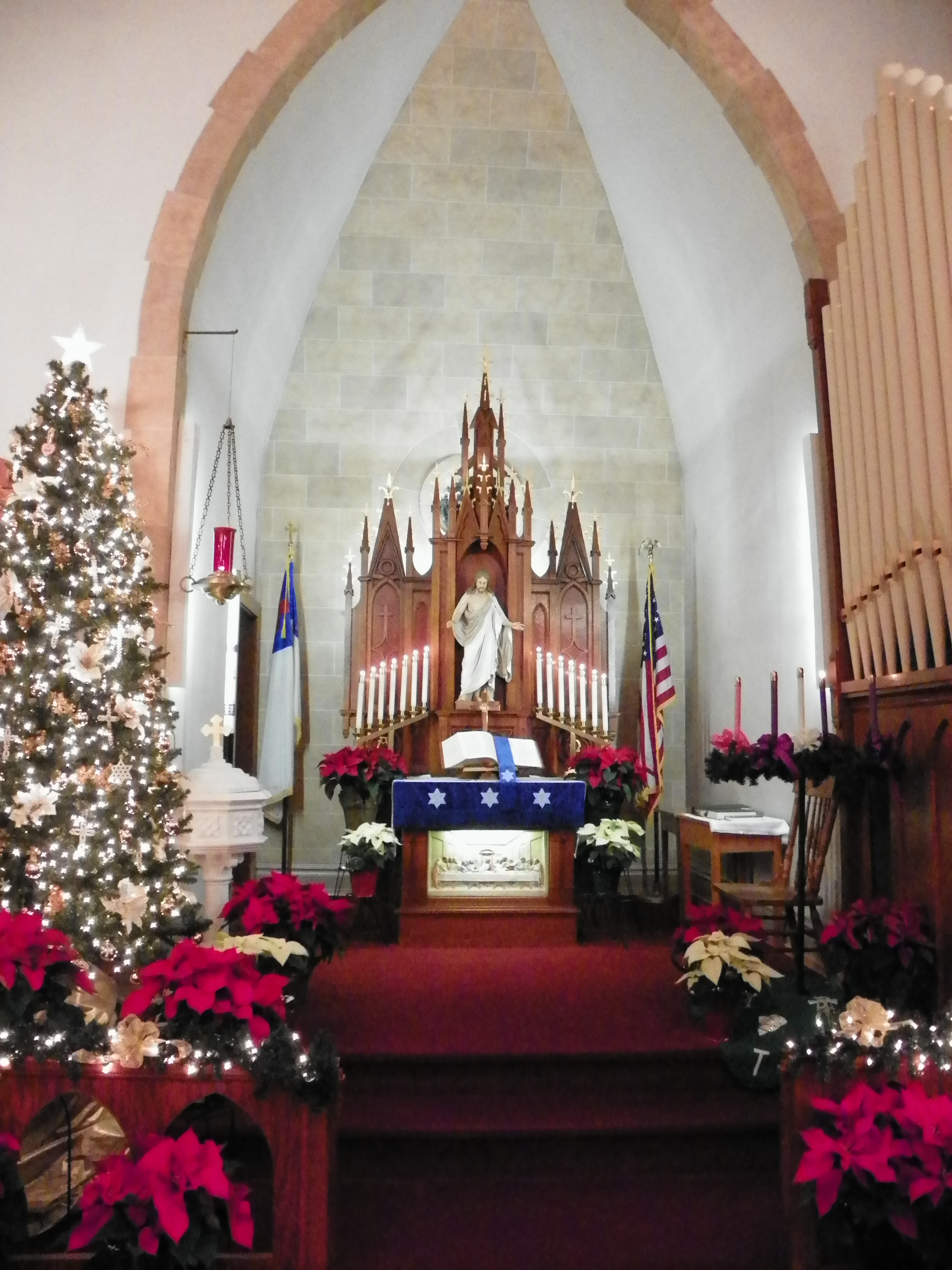
St. John interior

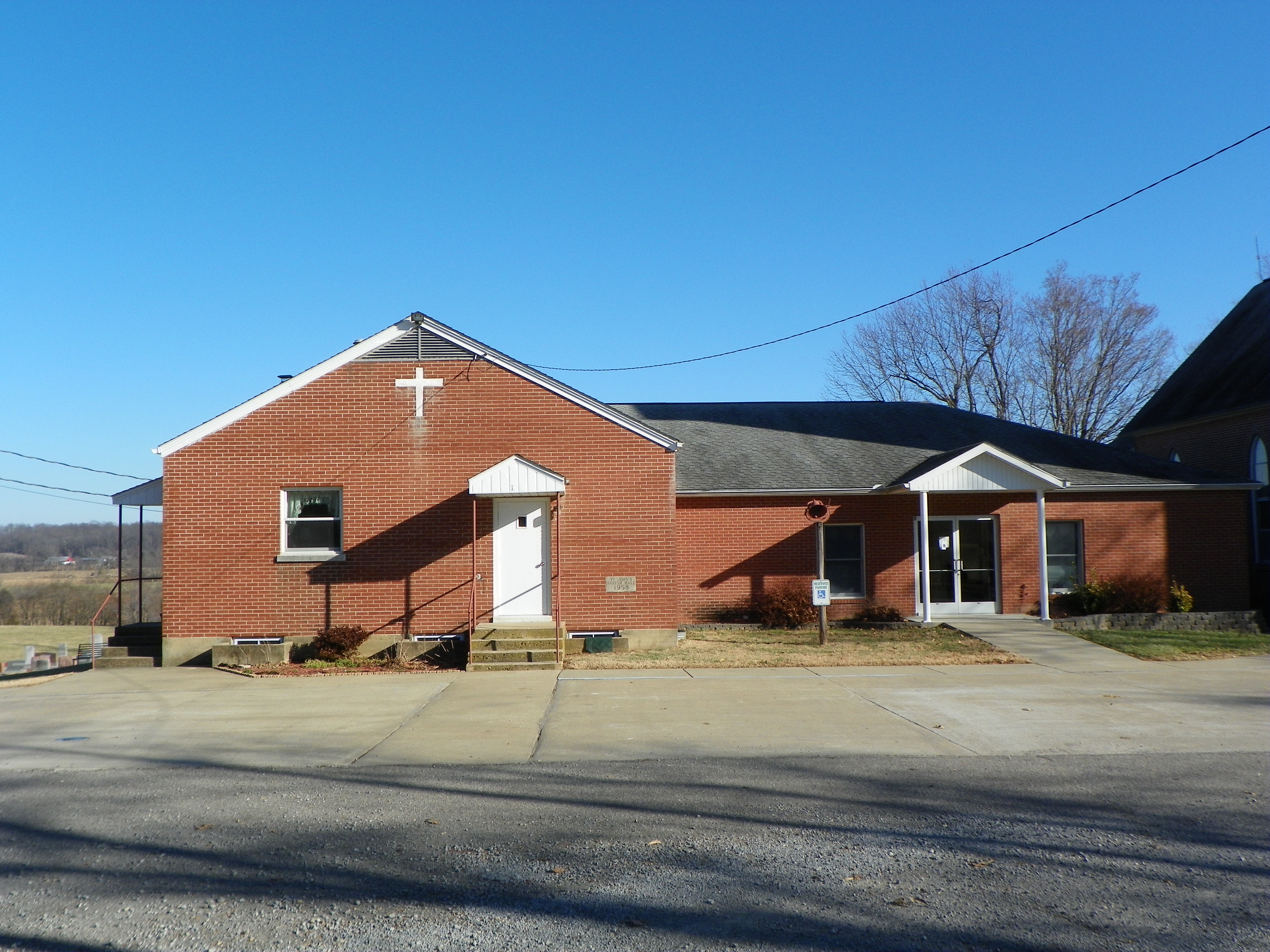
Parochial school
