= Flatrock =

Flatrock may refer to:

- Flatrock, Newfoundland and Labrador, Canada
- Flatrock Township, Henry County, Ohio, United States

== See also ==
- Flat Rock (disambiguation)
- Flatrock Creek (disambiguation)
- Flatrock River
