= St. Maurus Roman Catholic Church (Biehle, Missouri) =

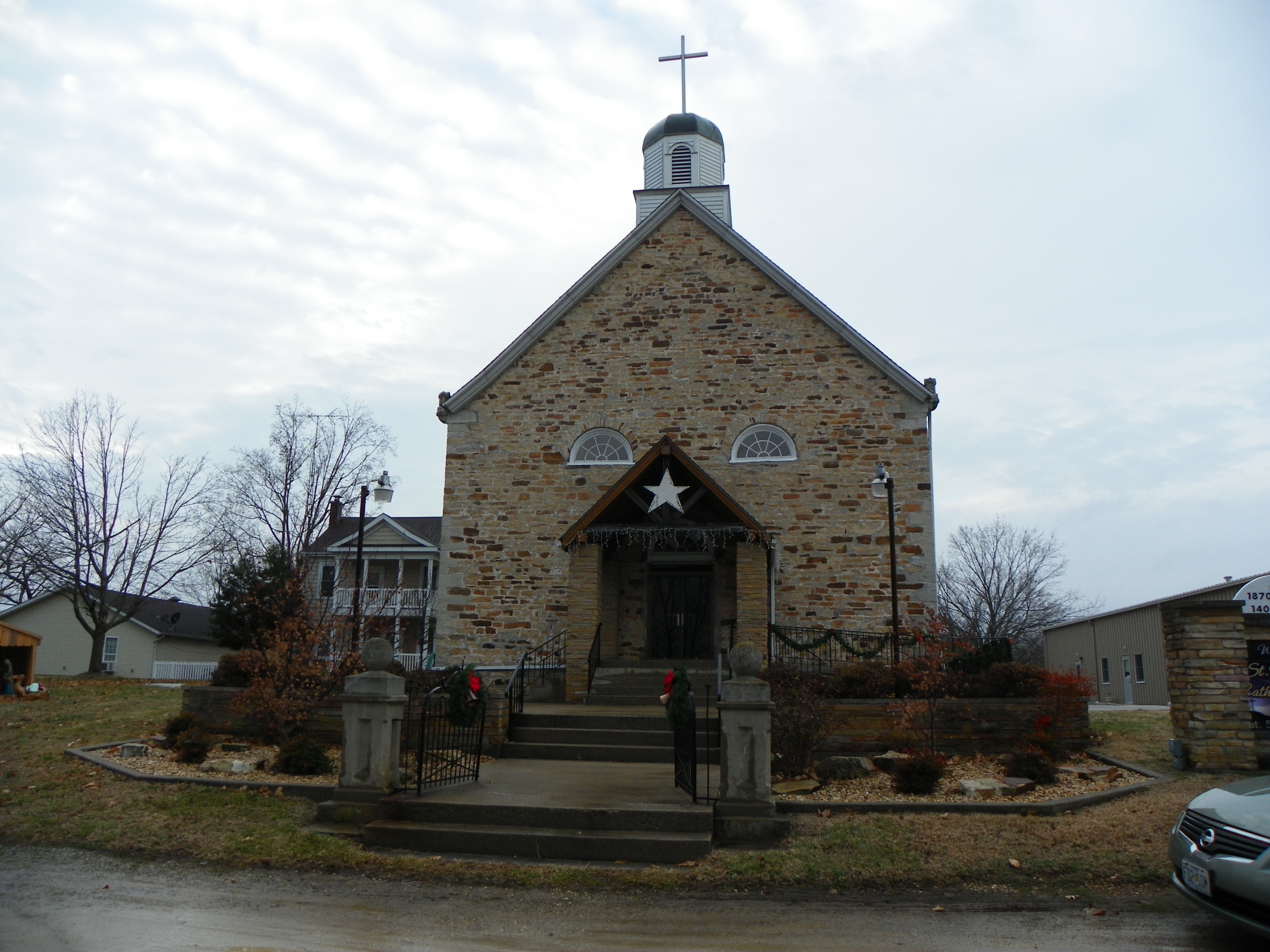

- Location within Missouri
- 37°36′19″N 89°50′24″W
- Location: 10198 Hwy B Biehle, Missouri
- Country: United States
- Denomination: Roman Catholic Church

History
- Founded: 1850s
- Consecrated: 1870

Architecture
- Groundbreaking: 1867
- Completed: 1870

Administration
- Archdiocese: Archdiocese of St. Louis
- Deanery: Ste. Genevieve

Clergy
- Archbishop: Most Rev. Robert Carlson

St. Maurus Church is parish of the Roman Catholic Church in Biehle, Missouri, USA, within the deanery of Ste. Genevieve of the Archdiocese of St. Louis.

== History ==
In 1844, Catholic German immigrants from the region of Baden came to the area known as Biehle Station. In the 1850s they built a log house for their children, which also served as a church for Mass when a priest was able to make the journey from Apple Creek or Perryville. In 1867, the community gathered and planned to erect a new church, was built on land donated by Maurus Biehle, hence the name of the church.

Maurus Biehle (1821-1897) donated the land and rock for the building that was cut from the bluff near Apple Creek just behind Biehle’s barn. In May 1869, the new stone church was dedicated, to Saint Maurus, patron saint of Mr. Biehle. The log church was then used as a rectory. In 1880, a new brick building was constructed for the priest, and the log residence was then used to house the school teacher. Father Joseph Hellwing became the first full-time priest.

On March 18, 1925, a tornado swept through the area. Several homes and farms were damaged or destroyed, resulting in two deaths. The church’s sanctuary was unroofed and the main altar was destroyed. The steeple was lifted off the roof and buried in the ground between the school and church. The bell was cracked and two of the outdoor shrines were demolished. When the church was repaired, the old steeple was replaced by a new cupola shaped spire.

In 1928 a new rectory was built.

== Parish ==
The parish serves 308 Catholics.

== Gallery ==
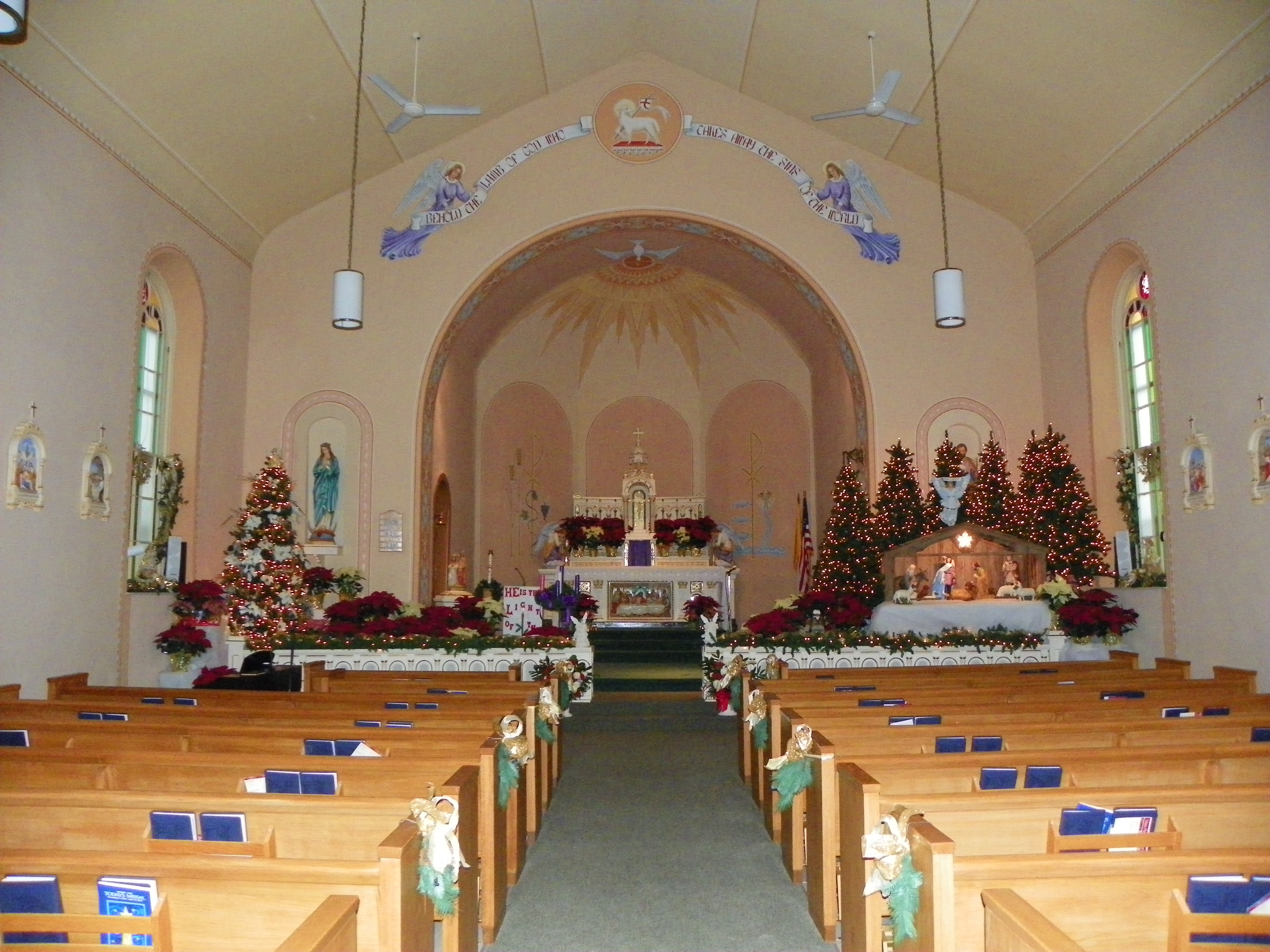
Church interior

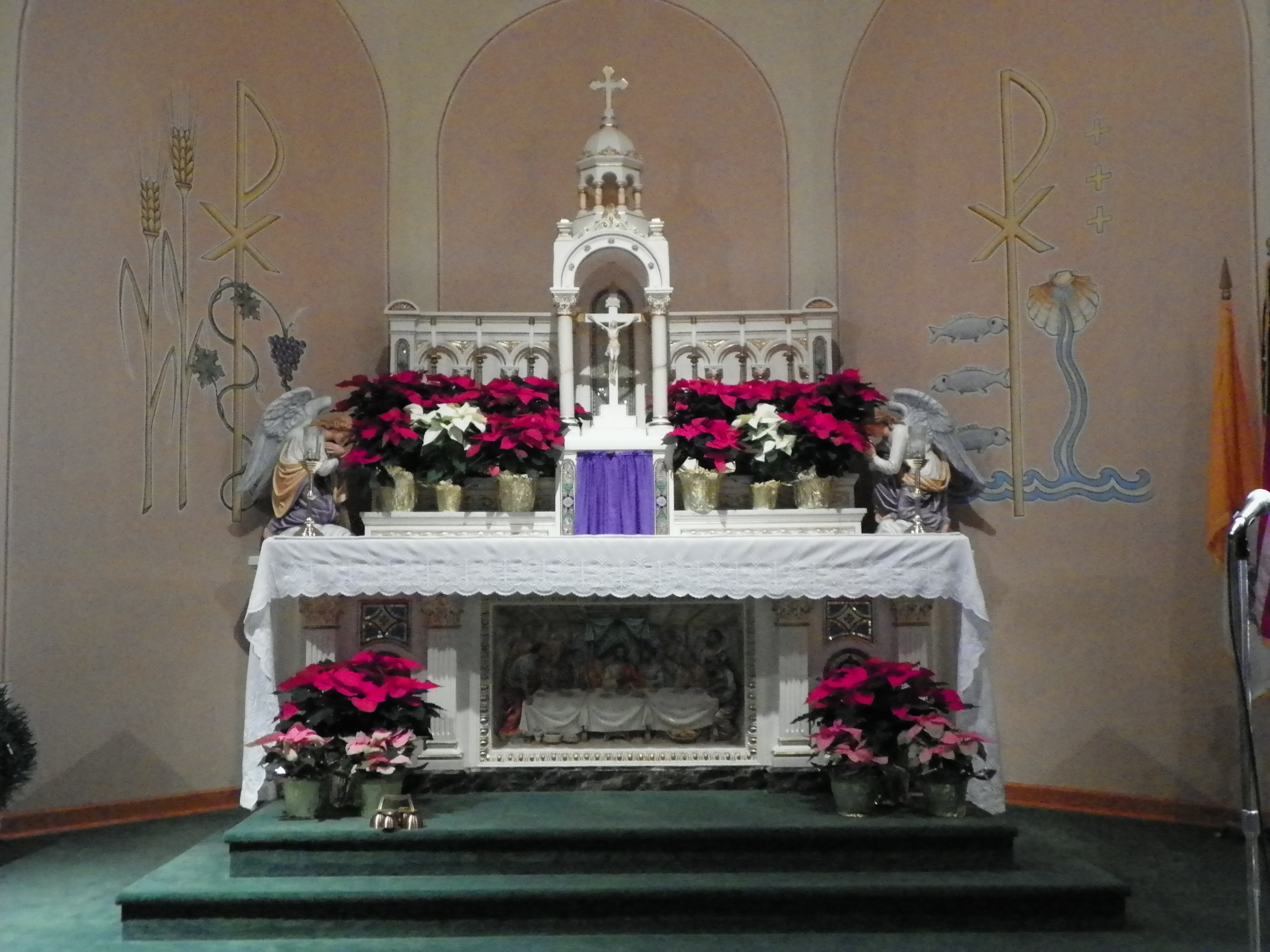
Altar

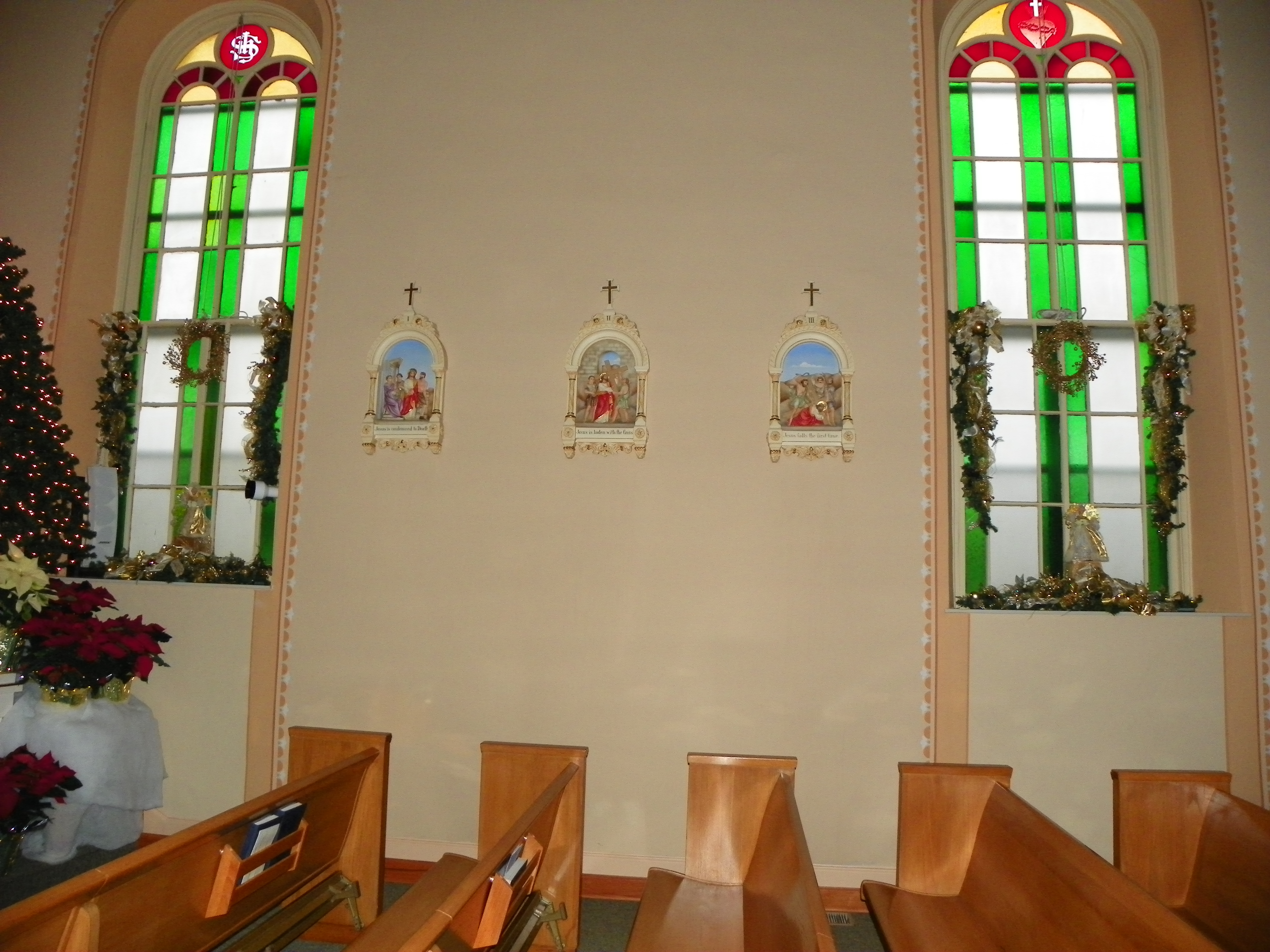
Interior
