= Apple Creek (Mississippi River tributary) =

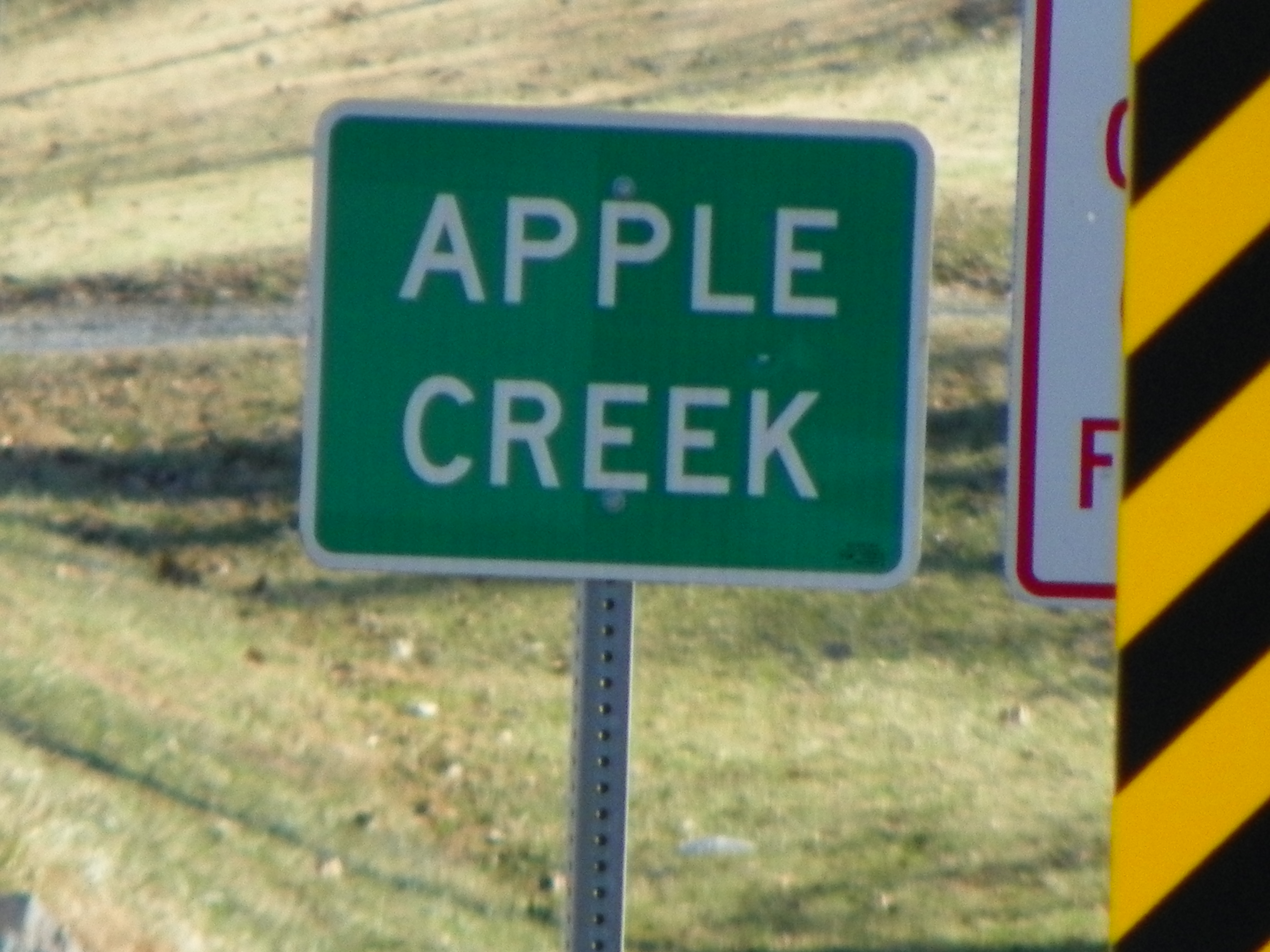
- Apple Creek (stream) sign from Highway 61
- Etymology: French: Rivière à la Pomme meaning "Apple River"

Location
- Country: United States
- State: Missouri

Physical characteristics
- Source
  - coordinates: 37°38′13″N 89°58′33″W
  - elevation: 820 ft (250 m)
- Mouth: Mississippi River
  - coordinates: 37°33′56″N 89°31′37″W
  - elevation: 322 ft (98 m)

Apple Creek is a stream that rises in western Perry County, Missouri and empties into the Mississippi River, forming the boundary between Perry and Cape Girardeau counties.

== Name ==
The name of Apple Creek derives from the French name Rivière à la Pomme. Since the Shawnee Indians cultivated farms and had a number of villages along this creek, it is probable that the early French travelers and hunters gave the name "Rivière à la Pomme" (later Americanized to Apple River or Apple Creek), from the apple trees which grew there.

== History ==
Although it is not known who the original native inhabitants were of the Apple Creek area, the area eventually become home to the Shawnee and Delaware Indians. Having originated in present-day Delaware and Pennsylvania, the Shawnee and Delaware Indians had been pushed off their lands by white settlement. The Spanish encouraged Shawnee and Delaware immigration, and granted them two large tracts of land in the Apple creek watershed, with the intention of the Shawnee and Delaware acting as a buffer against the Osage Indians, who were not on friendly terms with the Spanish authorities. Some 1,200 Shawnee and 600 Delaware were convinced to relocate to the Apple Creek watershed, and in 1784 the group of Shawnee and Delaware migrated and settled down in the area of Old Appleton. The "Grand Village Sauvage" was to the west of present-day Old Appleton and the "Petit Village Sauvage" was to the east of Old Appleton. In the early 1800s, American settlers began encroaching on the Shawnee and Delaware lands around Apple Creek. The Shawnee also requested the Spanish authorities to grant them protection from the Osage in 1807.

By 1815 the situation with white settlers had worsened so much that territorial governor William Clark and United States President James Madison ordered all white intruders removed from Shawnee and Delaware lands. However, this order was largely ignored by the authorities. By 1816, the encroachment by white settlers left the US Federal Government no choice but to relocate the Shawnee and Delaware to lands further west.

== Physical geography ==
The headwaters of Apple Creek arise just east of Missouri Route 51 approximately five miles southwest of Perryville. The stream flows generally southeast past the communities of Millheim and Biehle and crosses into the northwest corner of Cape Girardeau County and meanders past the community of Friedheim back to the northeast to become the county boundary between Cape Girardeau and Perry counties. The stream crosses under I-55 and U.S. Route 61 south of Uniontown and continues east to enter the Mississippi River between Neely's Landing to the south and Grand Tower to the north.

Apple Creek has a number of tributaries:

- Allie Creek
- Blue Shawnee Creek
- Buckeye Creek
- Flatrock Creek
- Froggy Branch
- Gerier Lake
- Hughes Creek
- Little Apple Creek
- Indian Creek
- Rocky Branch
- Shawnee Creek
- South Fork Apple Creek

== Cultural geography ==
Apple Creek rises in the southern part of Perry County and flows east to form the boundary line between Perry and Cape Girardeau counties. A number of bridges cross Apple Creek, including Apple Creek CR 630 bridge the Apple Creek Railroad bridge, the wrought-iron Old Appleton Bridge, and the pony truss Old Appleton US 61 Bridge. A town by the same name lies north of Apple Creek in Perry County, Missouri. The town of Old Appleton, Missouri, was also earlier known as Apple Creek, but changed its name to Old Appleton in the years leading up to the establishment of its post office in 1876.

== Communities ==
- Apple Creek
- Biehle
- Millheim
- Old Appleton

== Photo gallery ==
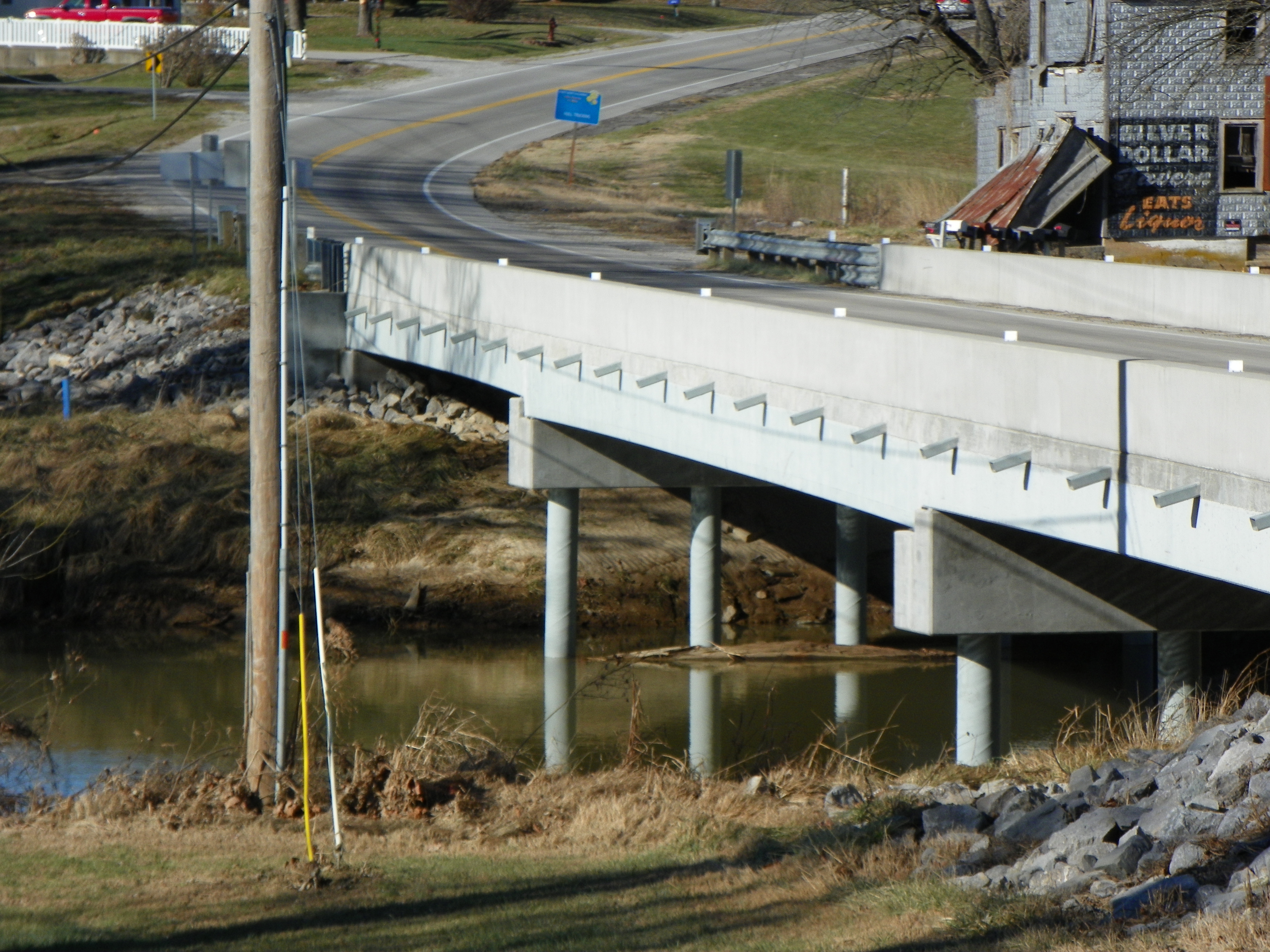
Highway 61 bridge over Apple Creek

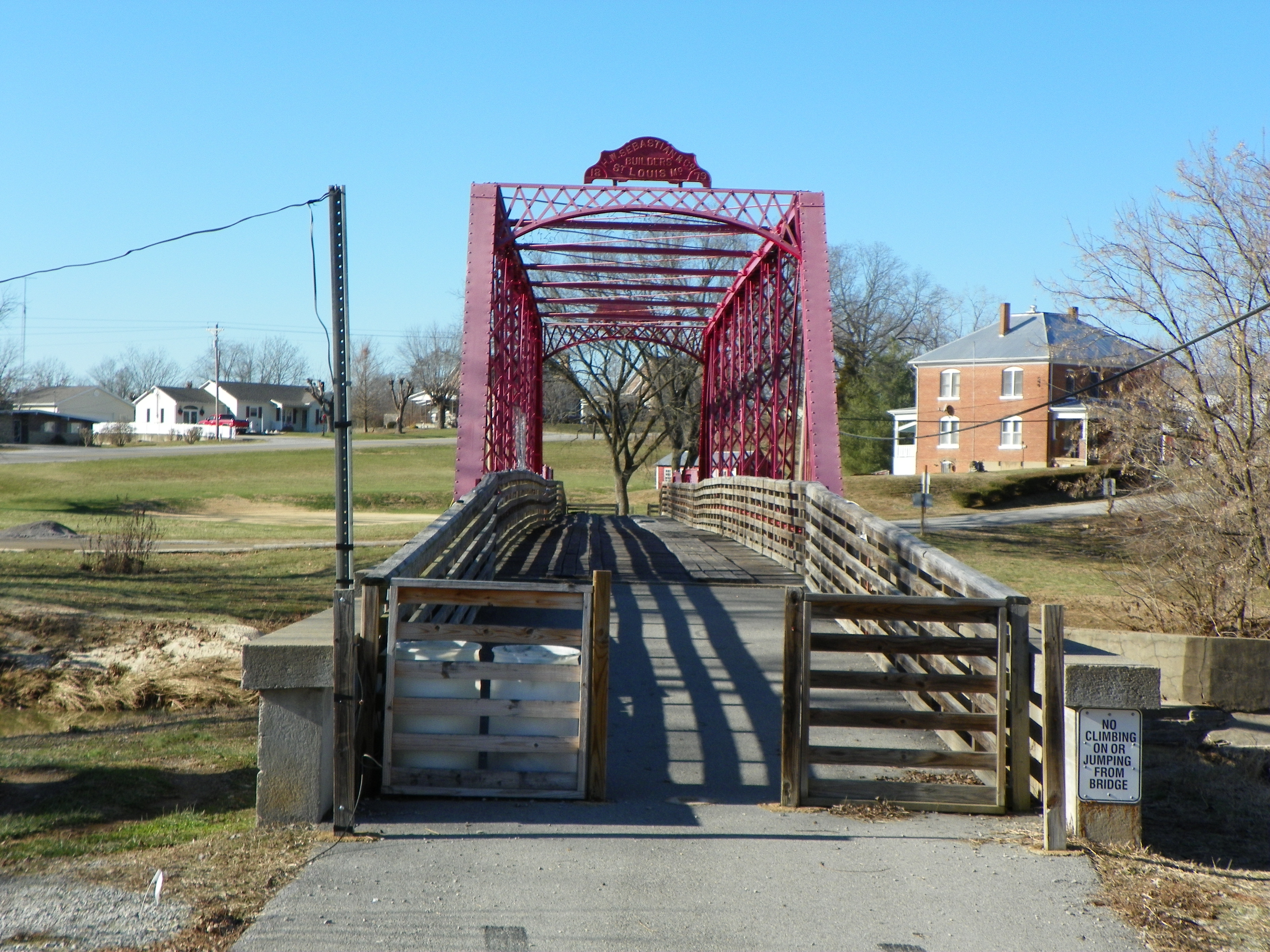
Apple Creek foot bridge

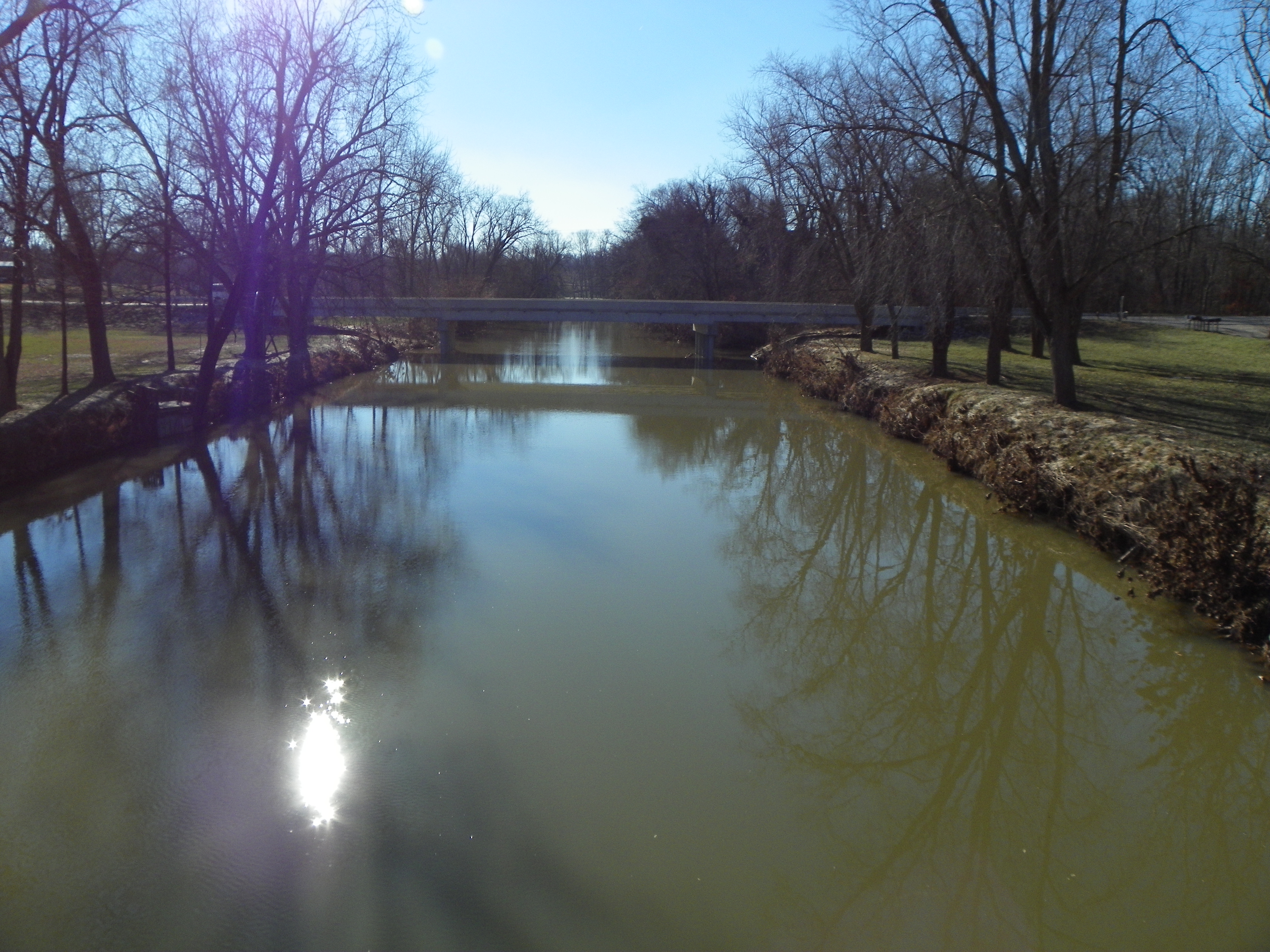
Highway 61 over Apple Creek

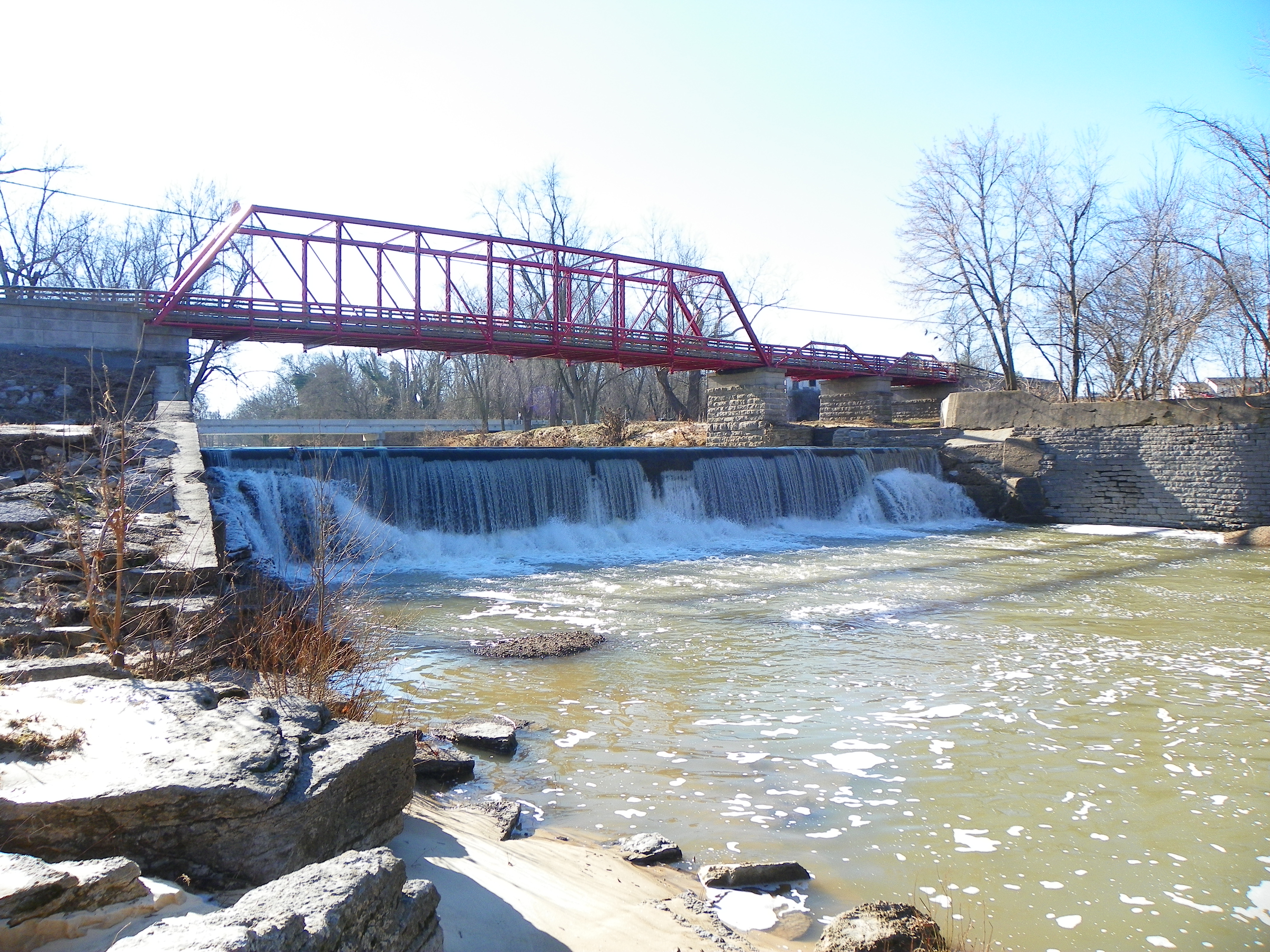
Apple Creek foot bridge
