= Cinque Hommes Township, Perry County, Missouri =

Township in the US state of Missouri

Cinque Hommes, Missouri
- Civil Township
- Location of Perry County
- Coordinates: 37°38′35″N 89°51′41″W
- Country: United States
- State: Missouri
- County: Perry

Area
  - Total: 55.5 sq mi (143.7 km^{2})
  - Land: 55.5 sq mi (143.7 km^{2})
  - Water: 0.39 sq mi (1.0 km^{2})
- GNIS Feature ID: 767154

Cinque Hommes is one of the eight townships located in Perry County, Missouri, in the United States of America.

== Etymology ==
Cinque Hommes Township is named after Cape Cinque Hommes on the Mississippi River. The original name was St. Cosme. However, the pronunciation of "St. Cosme" and "Cinque Hommes" is exactly the same in French, and the early Frenchmen who came after father St. Cosme, misunderstanding, called it by the latter name.

== History ==
Cape St. Cosme or Cape Cinque Hommes — a point on the Mississippi River — was conferred for Father Jean Francois Buisson de Saint Cosme (1667-1702), a missionary priest from the Quebec Seminary of Foreign Missions, who visited the spot in 1698 and erected a cross on Grand Tower. Jean St. Cosme was the son of Michael Buisson, a native of Cosme le Vert in the Diocese of Mans in France, and of Susanne Licheraffe. He was ordained a Seminarian priest at the age of twenty-three. Father St. Cosme was stationed first at Tamarois, or Tamaroa, in Illinois, and also labored in Acadia, Louisiana, and among the Natchez Indians in lower Louisiana. He was massacred by a party of the Sitimaches or Chetimacha Indians while descending the Mississippi in 1702.

The pronunciations of St. Cosme and Cinque Hommes (French: Five Men) is the same in French, and the early Frenchmen who came after father St. Cosme, misunderstanding, called it by the latter name. There is absolutely no tradition connected with five men, in either French or English.

In 1807 the Ste. Genevieve District was divided into six townships: Benton, Bellevue, St. Michaels, Big River, Ste. Genevienve and Cinque Hommes. With Missouri Statehood came the subdivision of the territory into counties. Perry County was organized in 1821. Perry County was divided into 3 townships: Brazeau, including the territory between the Cinque Hommes and Apple Creek; Bois Brule, in the northeast part of the county; and Cinque Hommes in the remainder of the county.

== Geography ==
Cinque Hommes covers an area of 55.5 square miles (143.7km2) and contains one incorporated village (Biehle), and four unincorporated communities: Highland, Millheim, Schumer Springs, and part of Shakertowne. Cinque Hommes Creek flows through the township and was also named after Cape Cinque Hommes.

== Demographics ==
=== 2000 census ===
As of the census of 2000, there were 1,210 people living in the township. The racial makeup of the town was 98.30% White, 0.3% American Indian and Alaska Native, and 0.80% from other races.

=== 2010 census ===
As of the census of 2010, there were 1,403 people, 519 households, residing in the township. The population density was 25 people per square mile. The racial makeup of the town was 98.60% White, 0.6% American Indian and Alaska Native, and 0.80% from other races.
