= Pocahontas, Missouri =

- Village
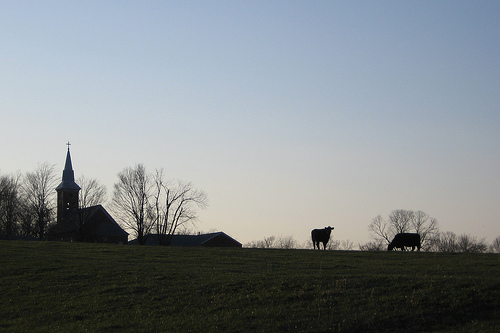
- Pocahontas at dusk

- Location of Pocahontas, Missouri
- Coordinates: 37°30′04″N 89°38′20″W
- Country: United States
- State: Missouri
- County: Cape Girardeau

Area
  - Total: 0.10 sq mi (0.27 km^{2})
  - Land: 0.10 sq mi (0.27 km^{2})
  - Water: 0 sq mi (0.00 km^{2})
- Elevation: 584 ft (178 m)

Population (2020)
  - Total: 97
  - Density: 942.0/sq mi (363.72/km^{2})
- Time zone: UTC-6 (Central (CST))
  - Summer (DST): UTC-5 (CDT)
- ZIP code: 63779
- Area code: 573
- FIPS code: 29-58628
- GNIS feature ID: 724682

Pocahontas is a village in Cape Girardeau County, Missouri, United States. The population was 97 at the 2020 census. It is part of the Cape Girardeau–Jackson, MO-IL Metropolitan Statistical Area.

== Name ==
According to tradition, Samuel Green opened a post office and started the town. As a result, the government required him to provide a name for the town. Samuel Green had fallen in love with a princess of the Shawnee and Delaware tribes living along Apple Creek, but she had left the region along with the tribes when they moved west. Green intended to name the town after this woman whom he longed for. Unfortunately, the name of this princess was difficult to pronounce and nearly as impossible to spell, so when registering the town’s name, Green decided to substitute his love’s name for the name of the historic Indian princess Pocahontas, of colonial Virginia fame.

"Joseph Abernathy who looked like an Indian and according to tradition was a descendant of Pocahontas, was the head of another branch of the Abernathy family. He too was born in NC and moved to MO at a very early date. The town of Pocahontas was named in honor of him and in recognition of this tradition."

== History ==
The early inhabitants of the area were the Mississippian Mound Builders, who were part of the Mississippian culture. The Mound Builders went into decline in the 12th and 13th centuries, resulting in a depopulation of the area. In the latter part of the 18th century, French and Spanish officials allowed the immigration of Shawnee and Delaware Indians from Ohio. In the 1820s, these Indians were moved further west, with only a few remaining behind. The last of the Indians to stay were removed from the area in 1857.

Early American settlers to the area were the Abernathy and Little families, who farmed the land around present-day Pocahontas. Samuel Green, an Englishman, purchased land from Joseph Abernathy and operated the Green Station general store and post office. The Applecreek Presbyterian Church was established in 1821 and celebrates its 200 year anniversary in 2021, German and Austrian immigrants began to settle around Pocahontas. St. John Iowa Synod Lutheran Church was founded in 1870, and in 1889 Zion Lutheran Church Missouri Synod was built. It was incorporated as a town in 1893. A flour mill was constructed by John Hatcher, and today the mill is still operated as the Bowman Milling Company. A public school and two Lutheran parochial schools were also established. As of 2015, the town had four stores, several shops, a planing mill and a lumber yard.

== Geography ==
Pocahontas is located in north-central Cape Girardeau County, approximately thirteen miles north-northeast of Cape Girardeau and seven miles due west of Neelys Landing on the Mississippi River. U.S. Route 61 passes one mile west of the community. The village is located between the headwaters of Blue Shawnee Creek and Muddy Shawnee Creek.

According to the United States Census Bureau, the village has a total area of 0.10 square miles (0.26 km^{2}), all land.

== Demographics ==
Historical population
Census	Pop.	Note	%±
1880	47		—
1900	100		—
1910	125		25.0%
1920	156		24.8%
1930	115		−26.3%
1940	119		3.5%
1950	130		9.2%
1960	128		−1.5%
1970	127		−0.8%
1980	130		2.4%
1990	90		−30.8%
2000	127		41.1%
2010	114		−10.2%
2020	97		−14.9%
U.S. Decennial Census 2020

=== 2010 census ===
As of the census of 2010, there were 114 people, 44 households, and 30 families living in the village. The population density was 1,140.0 inhabitants per square mile (440.2/km^{2}). There were 52 housing units at an average density of 520.0 per square mile (200.8/km^{2}). The racial makeup of the village was 99.12% White and 0.88% Black or African American.

There were 44 households, of which 34.1% had children under the age of 18 living with them, 56.8% were married couples living together, 6.8% had a female householder with no husband present, 4.5% had a male householder with no wife present, and 31.8% were non-families. 18.2% of all households were made up of individuals, and 9.1% had someone living alone who was 65 years of age or older. The average household size was 2.59 and the average family size was 3.00.

The median age in the village was 41 years. 22.8% of residents were under the age of 18; 7% were between the ages of 18 and 24; 25.5% were from 25 to 44; 30.7% were from 45 to 64; and 14% were 65 years of age or older. The gender makeup of the village was 50.9% male and 49.1% female.

=== 2000 census ===
As of the census of 2000, there were 127 people, 45 households, and 32 families living in the town. The population density was 1,280.9 inhabitants per square mile (494.6/km^{2}). There were 52 housing units at an average density of 524.5 per square mile (202.5/km^{2}). The racial makeup of the town was 100.00% White. Hispanic or Latino of any race were 0.79% of the population.

There were 45 households, out of which 37.8% had children under the age of 18 living with them, 62.2% were married couples living together, 6.7% had a female householder with no husband present, and 26.7% were non-families. 20.0% of all households were made up of individuals, and 6.7% had someone living alone who was 65 years of age or older. The average household size was 2.82 and the average family size was 3.36.

In the town the population was spread out, with 30.7% under the age of 18, 8.7% from 18 to 24, 29.1% from 25 to 44, 21.3% from 45 to 64, and 10.2% who were 65 years of age or older. The median age was 32 years. For every 100 females, there were 84.1 males. For every 100 females age 18 and over, there were 95.6 males.

The median income for a household in the town was $36,250, and the median income for a family was $41,667. Males had a median income of $29,500 versus $18,333 for females. The per capita income for the town was $13,650. There were no families and 3.7% of the population living below the poverty line, including none under 18 and 12.5% of those over 64.

== Classification ==
Under Missouri Revised Statute 72-050, towns with populations under 500 at the time of passage (1939) were declared to be villages. Having been incorporated in 1893, Pocahontas was unaffected by this statute, and is classified as a town despite its small population.

== Education ==
It is in the Jackson R-2 School District, which operates Jackson High School.

== Photo gallery ==
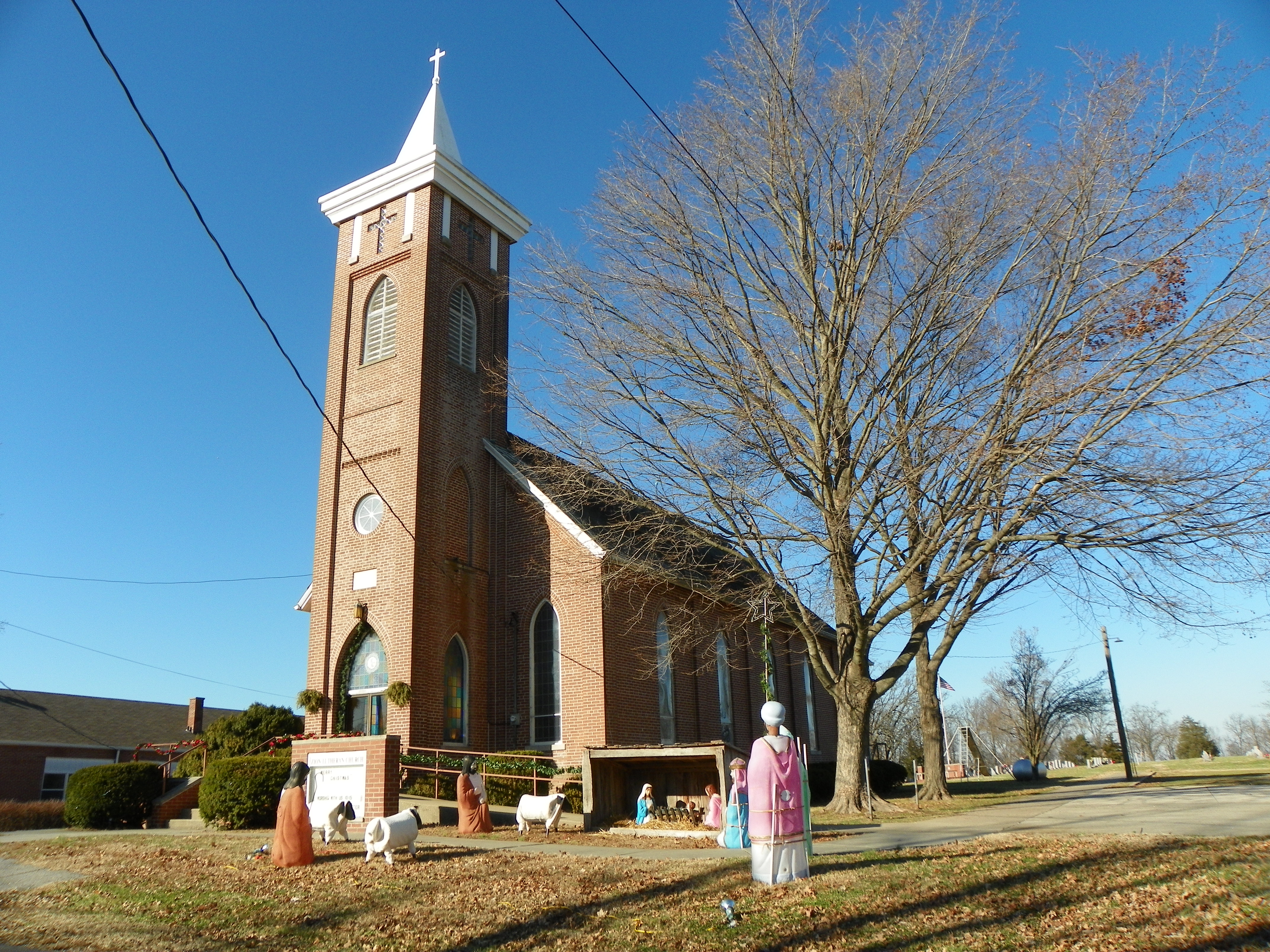
Zion Lutheran Church, Missouri Synod

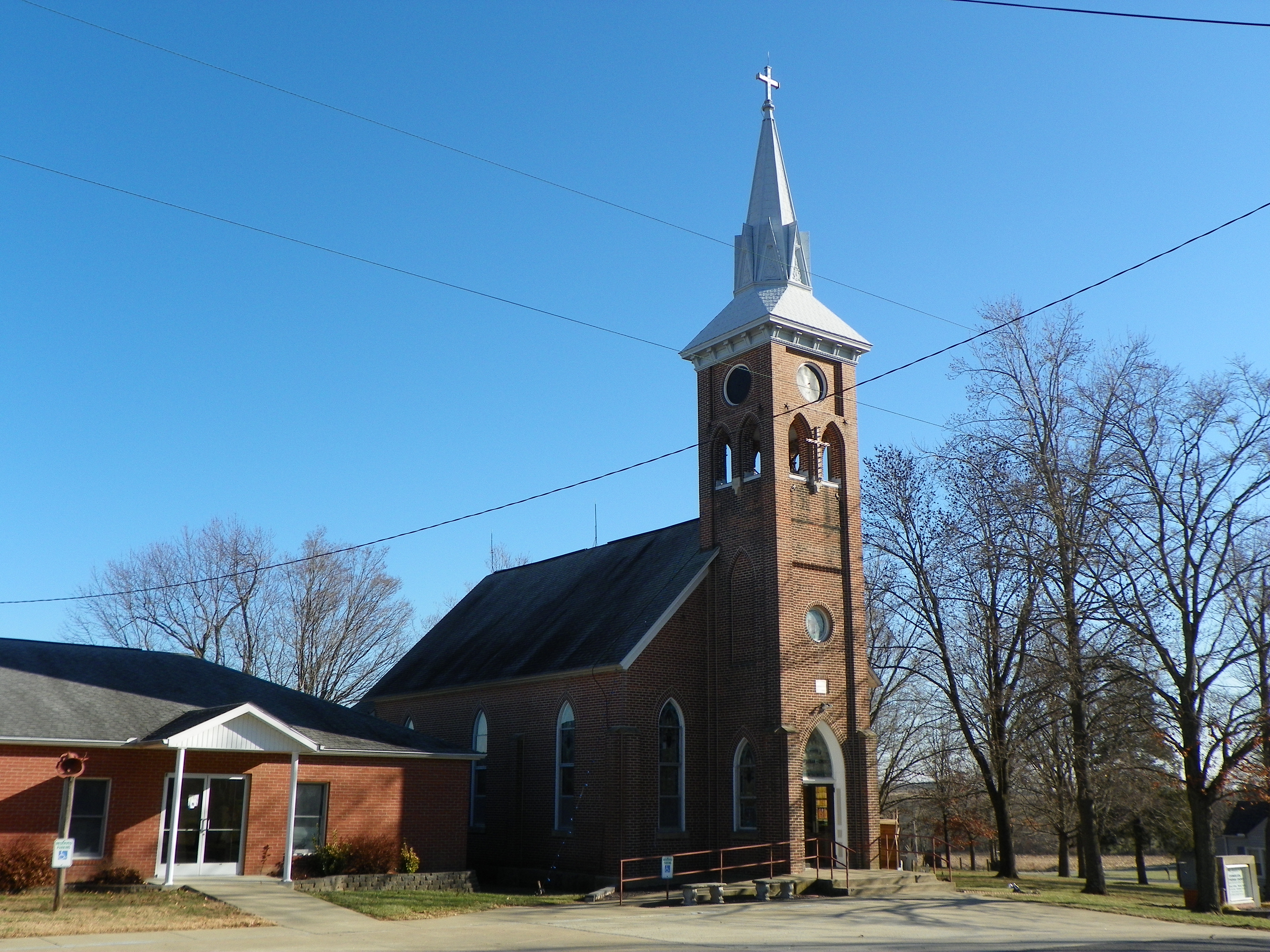
St. John's Evangelical Lutheran Church

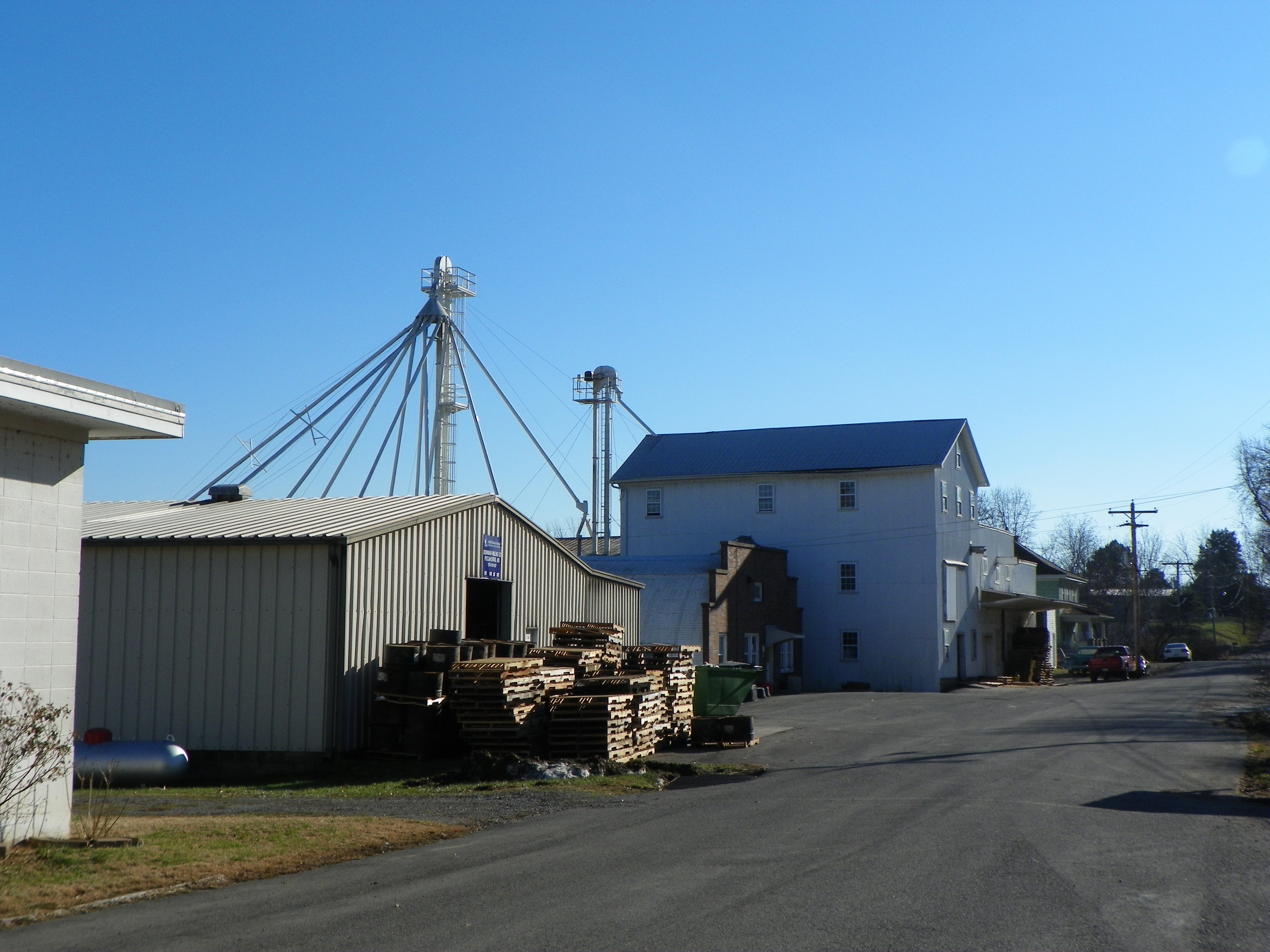
Pocahontas Feed Mill

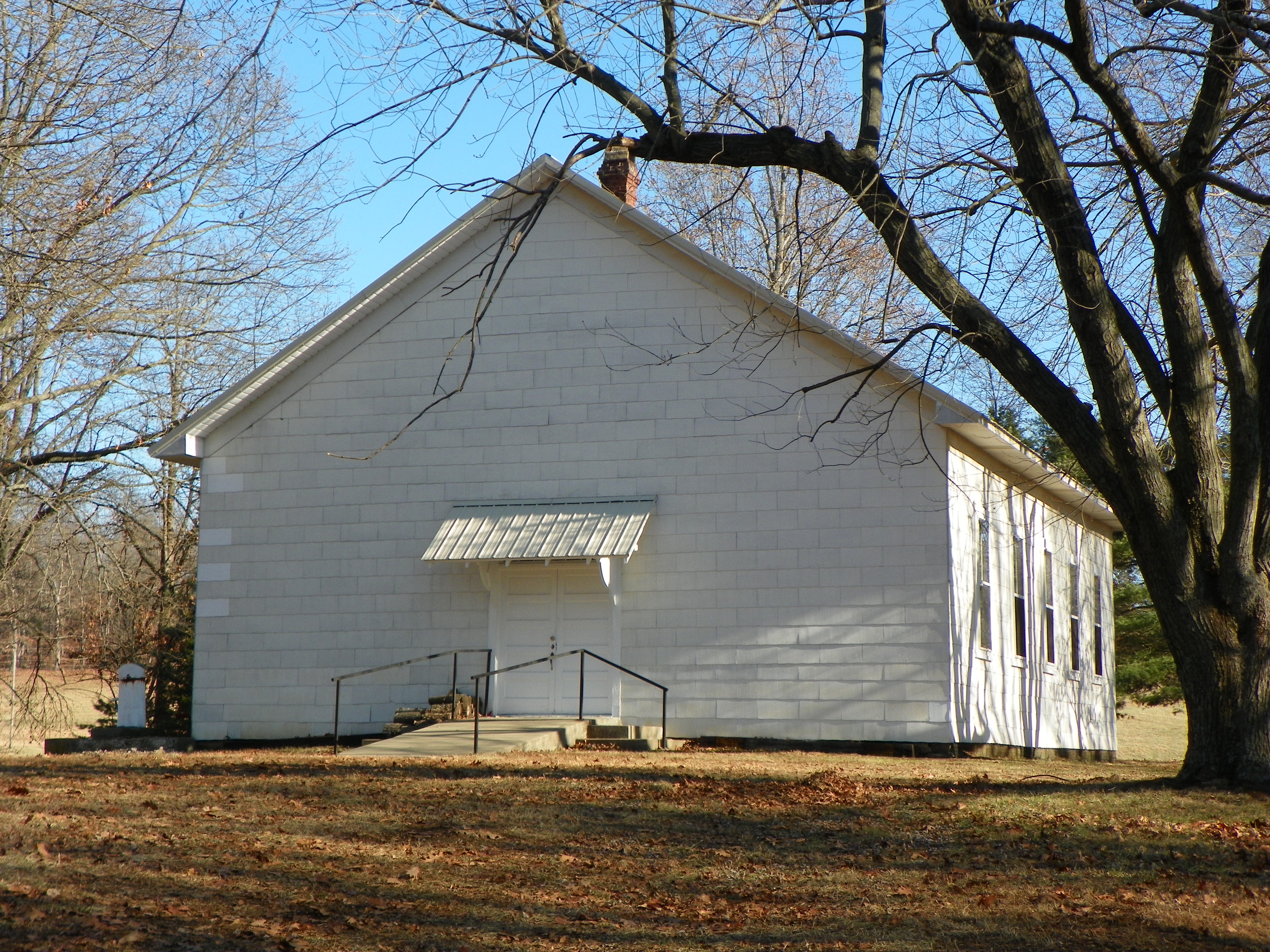
Apple Creek Presbyterian Church
