= Capes on the Mississippi River =

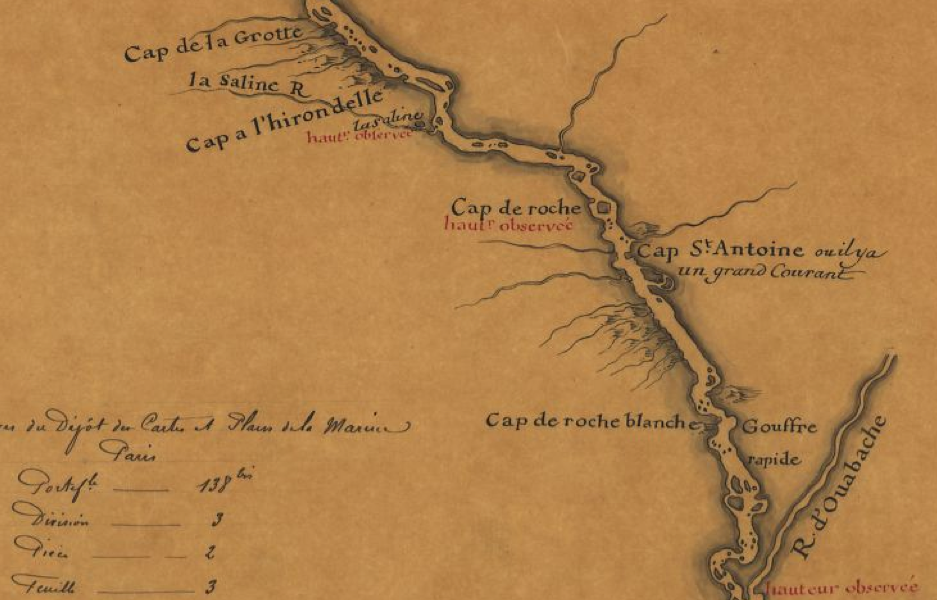
Capes on the Middle Mississippi - Carte de la rivière de Mississippi, by Guillaume de L'Isle

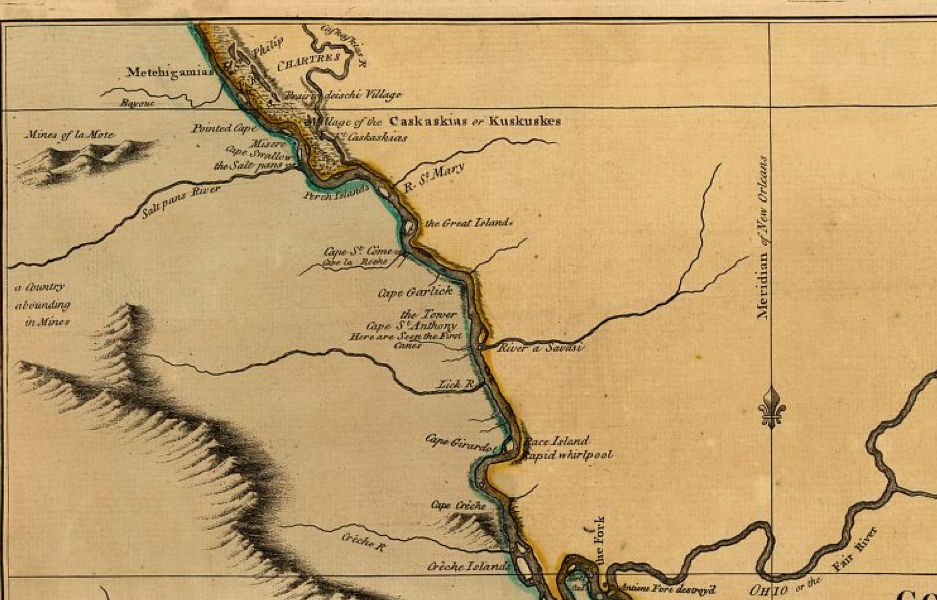
Map by Lieut. Ross - 1772

The term cape has a different tradition of usage in the American Midwest along the Mississippi River. The middle Mississippi River Valley once formed part of the French Colonies of Quebec and Louisiana, also referred to as Upper Louisiana (Haute-Louisiane) or the Illinois Country (Pays des Illinois). The Illinois Country also included the left bank of the Mississippi River in present-day Missouri.

The French explorers and mapmakers used the word cape (or in French, "cap") to describe the bluffs and promontories along the Mississippi River. A "cap" could sit next to any body of water, not just the ocean. Spanish authorities also used the term cabo (cape) for points on the Mississippi River. Along the Mississippi River between St. Louis and Cairo there are a number of capes of French origin.

Capes on the Mississippi River and tributaries
Name	Original French Name	Translation	State	Location
Cape Cinque Hommes or Cape St. Cosme	Cap des Cinque Hommes or Cap St. Cosme	cape of five men or cape of St. Cosme	MO	37°41′33.2″N 89°31′45.3″W
Cape Creche	Cap Crèche	cape manger	MO	
Cape La Croix	Cap de la Croix	cape of the cross	MO	37°14′53.51″N 89°28′05.76″W
Cap à la Cruche	Cap à la Cruche	cape pitcher	MO	
Cape Fair	Cape Faire	--	MO	36°43′48″N 93°30′37″W
Cape Garlick	Cap à l'Ail	cape garlic	MO	
Cape Girardeau	Cap de Girardot	cape of Girardot	MO	37°18′21″N 89°31′05″W
Cap au Gris	Cap au Gris	cape of gray	MO	38°59′56″N 90°41′30″W
Cape de la Grotte	Cap de la Grotte	cape of the caves	MO	
Cap aux Pistolets	Cap aux Pistolets	cape of the pistols	MN	
Cape La Roche	Cap de la Roche	cape of the rock	MO	
Cape de Roche Blanche	Cap de Roche blanche	cape of the white rock	MO	
Cape Rock	--	--	MO	37°19′43″N 89°29′45″W
Cape St. Anthony	Cap de St. Antoine	cape of Saint Anthony	IL	37°37′57″N 89°30′7″W
Cape Swallow	Cap l'hirondelle	cape swallow	MO	
Pointed Cape	Cap de la Pointe	cape of the point	MO	

== See also ==
- Cape (geography)
