= Indian Creek (Mississippi River tributary) =

Stream in the U.S. state of Missouri

Indian Creek is a stream in Cape Girardeau County in the U.S. state of Missouri. It is a tributary of the Mississippi River.

The stream headwaters arise at 37°29′23″N 89°38′27″W approximately one-half mile south of Pocahontas just east of Missouri Route C at an elevation of approximately 590 feet. The stream flows southeast and then east passing under and then flowing parallel to Missouri Route 177 to its confluence with the Mississippi at 37°28′58″N 89°29′22″W at an elevation of 338 feet. The stream forms the northern boundary of the Trail of Tears State Park just prior to its confluence.

Indian Creek took its name from the Shawnee Indians in the area.

== See also ==
- List of rivers of Missouri
