= Jackson High School (Missouri) =

High School in Missouri, U.S.

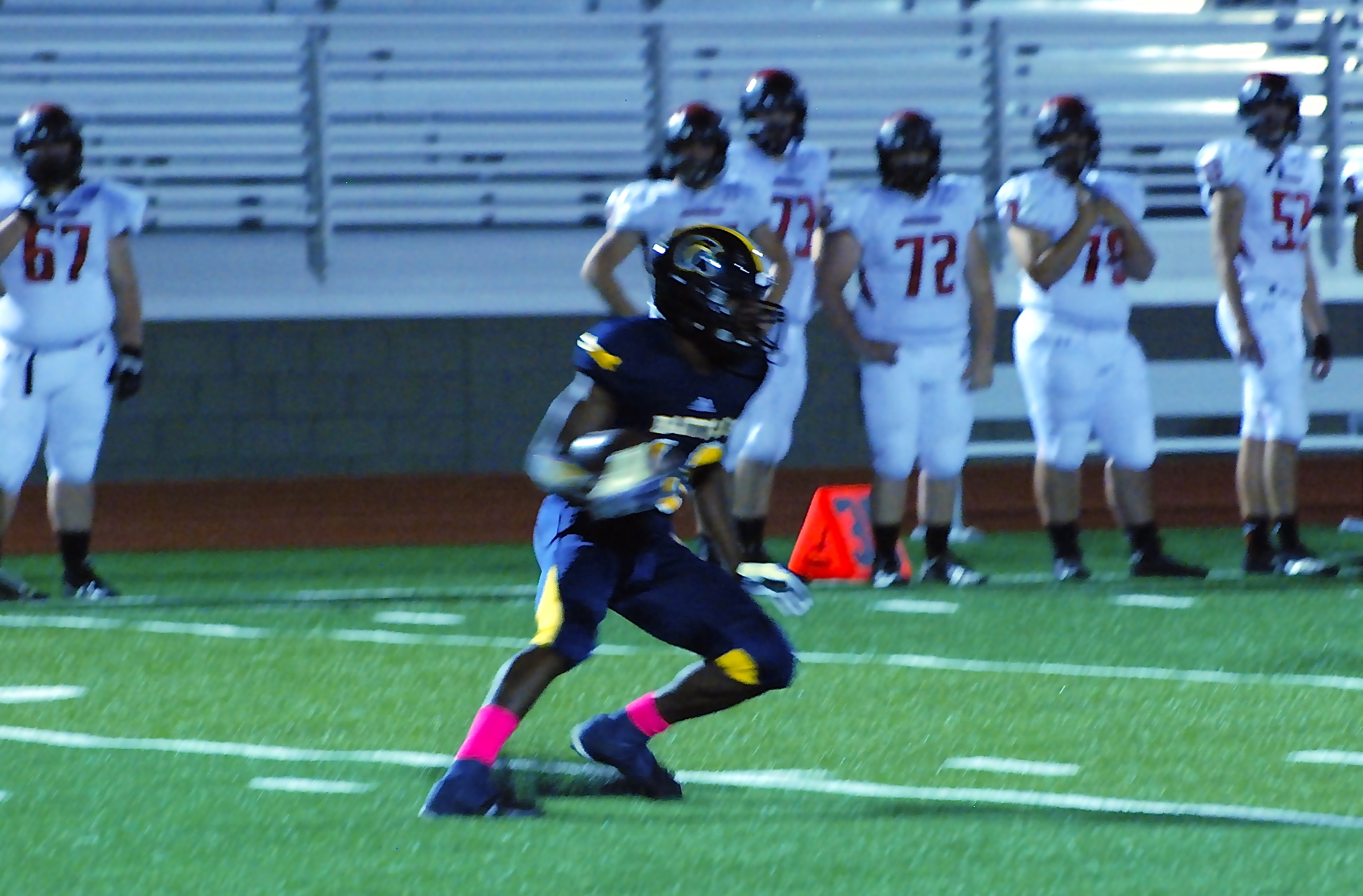
- Jackson High School football player, 2013

Location
- 315 S Missouri, Jackson, MO 63755; United States
- 37°22′46″N 89°40′15″W

Information
- School district: Jackson R-2 School District
- NCES School ID: 291560000738
- Principal: Dr. Anitra Bahner
- Grades: 9–12
- Enrollment: 1,848 (2023–2024)
- Colors: Red and black
- Team name: Indians
- Website: shs.jacksonr2schools.com

Jackson High School (also referred to as Jackson Senior High or simply JHS), is located in Jackson, Missouri, United States. It consists of grades 9–12 and is a part of the Jackson R-2 School District.

The district includes most of Jackson, Burfordville, Gordonville, Millersville, New Wells, Pocahontas, most of Shawneetown, and small sections of Cape Girardeau.

== History ==
It was established in 1920. One of the original buildings of the school was called Old A. This building stood as a historical landmark until its demolition in 2017 as a result of the voter approved no tax bond, Prop J, which was passed in 2017. A new building has been constructed on the same ground that Old A occupied. The new building is made of new brick and the same limestone that was salvaged from Old A. The building consists of most freshman classes and has the highest technology in the whole school.

On completion in 2018, the new building hosts primarily freshman students and has the latest classroom technology. Jackson High School is now a 9–12 senior high school in Southeast Missouri with a student population of more than 1,600 students.

== Notable alumni ==
- Gary Friedrich (1943–2018), writer for Marvel Comics
- Linda M. Godwin (born 1952), astronaut
- Roy Thomas (born 1940), writer and editor for Marvel Comics
- Connor Tollison (born 2002), college football center for the Missouri Tigers
