= Blue Shawnee Creek =

Stream in the US state of Missouri

Blue Shawnee Creek is a stream located in Cape Girardeau County in the U.S. state of Missouri. The Blue Shawnee and the Muddy Shawnee Creek merge to form the Shawnee Creek.

The stream headwaters arise about one mile south of Pocahontas (at 37°29′31″N 89°38′59″W) and the stream flows north-northeast past Pocahontas for about five miles to its merger with the Muddy Shawnee about one-half mile north of the community of New Wells.

Blue Shawnee Creek is named for the main stream of which this creek is a branch, and "blue" indicates the clarity of the water, reflecting the sky.

== See also ==
- List of rivers of Missouri
