= Old Appleton Bridge =

- U.S. National Register of Historic Places
- Old Appleton Bridge in November 2026

- Location within Missouri Location within the United States
- Location: Main Street over Apple Creek, Old Appleton, Missouri
- Coordinates: 37°35′58″N 89°42′50″W
- Area: less than one acre
- Built: 1879
- Built by: Sebastian, H.W. & Co.
- Architectural style: Pratt Truss Iron Bridge
- NRHP reference No.: 09000648
- Added to NRHP: August 25, 2009

Old Appleton Bridge is a historic Pratt Truss Iron Bridge located at Old Appleton, Cape Girardeau County and Perry County, Missouri. It was built in 1879, and consists of a wrought iron, pin-connected, Pratt through truss main span, with two pin-connected, three panel Pratt pony-truss approach spans. It rests on limestone block masonry piers. The total length of the bridge is 161 feet (49 m).

It was listed on the National Register of Historic Places in 2009.
