= Shawneetown, Missouri =

Unincorporated community in Missouri, U.S.

- unincorporated community
- Location of Cape Girardeau, Missouri
- Coordinates: 37°33′04″N 89°39′07″W
- Country: United States
- State: Missouri
- County: Cape Girardeau
- Township: Shawnee Township

Area
  - Total: 0.59 sq mi (1.53 km^{2})
  - Land: 0.59 sq mi (1.53 km^{2})
  - Water: 0 sq mi (0.00 km^{2})
- Elevation: 518 ft (158 m)

Population (2020)
  - Total: 132
  - Density: 223.7/sq mi (86.36/km^{2})
- Time zone: UTC-6 (Central (CST))
  - Summer (DST): UTC-5 (CDT)
- ZIP code: 63755
- Area code: 573
- FIPS code: 29-67124
- GNIS feature ID: 731650

Shawneetown is an unincorporated community in Shawnee Township in northern Cape Girardeau County, Missouri, United States. As of the 2020 census, Shawneetown had a population of 132. It is located twenty miles north of Cape Girardeau and is part of the Cape Girardeau–Jackson, MO-IL Metropolitan Statistical Area.

== Etymology ==
Shawneetown sits on the site of a former Shawnee community, hence the name.

== History ==
Shawneetown was site of one of the six Shawnee and Delaware villages along Apple Creek in both Perry and Cape Girardeau counties and Indian Creek. The village was inhabited by Shawnee immigrants from Ohio and Indiana and Delaware immigrants originally from Delaware and New Jersey, but residing with the Shawnee in Ohio and Indiana. The Shawnee and Delaware first immigrated into the area, on request by the Spanish authorities, in 1787, to act as a buffer between the French settlements to the north and the Osage Indians to the south. The French settlers called their village Village Sauvage (French: savage or wild village). The Shawnee and Delaware were forced to give up their Spanish land grants and leave the area in 1825. The vacant land was later resettled by Americans. Shawneetown operated its own post office in the years 1871–1907, and 1913–1946, and is also home to Trinity Lutheran church.

== Demographics ==
Historical population
Census	Pop.	Note	%±
2020	132		—
U.S. Decennial Census

Shawneetown first appeared as a census designated place in the 2020 U.S. census.

== Education ==
Most of Shawneetown is in the Jackson R-2 School District, while a portion is in Oak Ridge R-VI School District. The former district operates Jackson High School.
