= Flatrock Creek (Apple Creek tributary) =

Stream in the U.S. state of Missouri

Flatrock Creek is a stream in Cape Girardeau County in the U.S. state of Missouri. It is a tributary of Apple Creek.

The stream headwaters arise just east of US Route 61 approximately one mile west of Pocahontas at 37°30′11″N 89°39′28″W. The stream flows north past Shawneetown and on to its confluence with Apple Creek at 37°35′12″N 89°38′23″W.

Flatrock Creek was named for a large rock of the same name which was destroyed by railroad construction.

== See also ==
- List of rivers of Missouri
