= Flat Rock Creek =

Flat Rock Creek or Flatrock Creek may refer to one of the following rivers:

- Flat Rock Creek (Texas) in Kendall County, Texas
- Flatrock Creek (Apple Creek), a stream in Missouri
- Flat Rock Creek (Oklahoma) in Wagoner County, Oklahoma
- Flatrock Creek (Auglaize River) in northeastern Indiana and northwestern Ohio
- Flatrock River (Indiana), sometimes also known as Flatrock Creek
