= New Wells, Missouri =

Unincorporated community in Missouri, U.S.

- Census-Designated Place
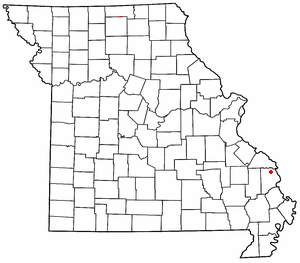
- Location of New Wells in Missouri
- Coordinates: 37°33′26″N 89°37′30″W
- Country: United States
- State: Missouri
- County: Cape Girardeau

Area
  - Total: 0.58 sq mi (1.51 km^{2})
  - Land: 0.58 sq mi (1.51 km^{2})
  - Water: 0 sq mi (0.00 km^{2})

Population (2020)
  - Total: 40
  - Density: 68.7/sq mi (26.51/km^{2})
- FIPS code: 29-52364
- GNIS feature ID: 731626

New Wells is an unincorporated community in northern Cape Girardeau County, Missouri, United States. It is located 20 miles (32 km) north of Cape Girardeau and is part of the Cape Girardeau–Jackson, MO-IL Metropolitan Statistical Area.

== Etymology ==
The source of the original name Johannisberg remains something of a mystery. There are many German places by that name, but none of them is listed as the original home of any of the Saxon colony that came to Perry County. It is not likely to have been the well-known Johannisberg on the Rhine, which is a Catholic stronghold, nor is it likely to have been Johannisberg in East Prussia, which also would not have had any connection with the Saxons. Austrian settlers referred to the community as Neu Wels, after the city in Austria, which was later Americanized to New Wells.

== History ==
Johannisberg was one of the seven colonies established in 1839 in the Saxon Migration to Perry County, Missouri. Johannisberg is said to have been an offshoot of the Dresden settlement. In May 1840, the members of the New York group of Saxon migrants who had arrived in December 1839, and who had been members of C. F. W. Walther's congregation at Dresden, branched off and founded a village seven miles (11 km) away in Cape Girardeau County. It is thought the split was caused by a quarrel over the sale of lots at Wittenberg to the general public. Members of the New York group violently opposed this move, which was proposed because of the failure of Wittenberg to grow as fast as had been hoped. They severed financial connections with the community, and withdrew into a separate settlement, although they continued other connections with the Saxons. Walther continued to serve both Dresden and Johannisberg until the end of 1841, but after his departure for St. Louis both were made branches of Altenburg. An account in the Western District Lutheran tells how in the late 1840s services were held on a hill near the town.

In 1852, fresh settlers arrived from Austria, and these for a while continued to attend church at Altenburg in Perry County. At this time the place began to be known to the people of Altenburg by the name of Österreich, German for Austria. But because Apple Creek often rose and prevented attendance at the church in Altenburg, a separate church was organized in 1853 for Johannisberg. L. F. Dippold, pastor at Johannisberg, wrote that the Austrian settlers never called the place Österreich, but rather called it Neu Wels after their home city of Wels, located 15 miles (24 km) southwest of Linz in Upper Austria, and later the name was Americanized to New Wells.

== Demographics ==
Historical population
| Census | Pop. | Note | %± |
|---|---|---|---|
| 2020 | 40 | | — |
U.S. Decennial Census

New Wells first appeared as a census designated place in the 2020 U.S. census.

== Education ==
New Wells is in the Jackson R-II School District, which operates Jackson High School.
