= Biehle, Missouri =

- Census-designated place
- Location of Biehle, Missouri
- Coordinates: 37°36′24″N 89°50′16″W
- Country: United States
- State: Missouri
- County: Perry
- Township: Cinque Hommes
- Incorporated: March 13, 1992
- Disincorporated: November 6, 2003

Area
  - Total: 0.22 sq mi (0.57 km^{2})
  - Land: 0.22 sq mi (0.57 km^{2})
  - Water: 0 sq mi (0.00 km^{2})
- Elevation: 515 ft (157 m)

Population (2020)
  - Total: 47
  - Density: 212.2/sq mi (81.92/km^{2})
- Time zone: UTC-6 (Central (CST))
  - Summer (DST): UTC-5 (CDT)
- ZIP code: 63775
- Area code: 573
- FIPS code: 29-05320
- GNIS feature ID: 2587053

Biehle is a former village in Perry County, Missouri, United States. The population was 47 at the 2020 census. The community was founded in 1876 and named after the Biehle family.

== History ==
In the 1840s, German Catholic immigrants from the Baden region of Germany settled in the area first known as Biehle Station. One of the earliest settlers was a German immigrant named Maurus Biehle. In the 1850s, a log church was built on land donated by Maurus Biehle. In May 1869, a new stone church, St. Maurus Catholic Church, was dedicated for the German Catholic parish, and in January 1870, Father Joseph Hellwing became the first full-time priest.

In 1925, the Tri-State Tornado struck the community, ripping the roof off a church, destroying many houses, and killing four people in town. The village was disincorporated in 2003.

== Geography ==
Biehle is located along Missouri Route B on a ridge above a sharp bend in Apple Creek. The Perry–Cape Girardeau county line lies three-quarters of a mile south of the community.

Biehle is located in Cinque Hommes township.

According to the United States Census Bureau, the CDP has a total area of 0.22 square miles (0.57 km^{2}), all land.

== Demographics ==
Historical population
Census	Pop.	Note	%±
2000	11		—
2010	48		336.4%
2020	47		−2.1%
U.S. Decennial Census 2020

=== 2010 census ===
As of the census of 2010, there were 48 people, 19 households, and 12 families living in the village. The population density was 218.2 inhabitants per square mile (84.2/km^{2}). There were 23 housing units at an average density of 104.5 per square mile (40.3/km^{2}). The racial makeup of the village was 100.00% White.

There were 19 households, of which 36.8% had children under the age of 18 living with them, 42.1% were married couples living together, 15.8% had a female householder with no husband present, 5.3% had a male householder with no wife present, and 36.8% were non-families. 31.6% of all households were made up of individuals, and 10.6% had someone living alone who was 65 years of age or older. The average household size was 2.53 and the average family size was 3.17.

The median age in the CDP was 32.5 years. 27.1% of residents were under the age of 18; 10.5% were between the ages of 18 and 24; 29.2% were from 25 to 44; 25.1% were from 45 to 64; and 8.3% were 65 years of age or older. The gender makeup of the CDP was 47.9% male and 52.1% female.

=== 2000 census ===
As of the census of 2000, there were 11 people, 5 households, and 4 families living in the village. The population density was 113.1 inhabitants per square mile (43.7/km^{2}). There were 5 housing units at an average density of 51.4 per square mile (19.8/km^{2}). The racial makeup of the village was 100.00% White.

There were 5 households, out of which 20.0% had children under the age of 18 living with them, 80.0% were married couples living together, and 20.0% were non-families. 20.0% of all households were made up of individuals, and none had someone living alone who was 65 years of age or older. The average household size was 2.20 and the average family size was 2.50.

In the village, the population was spread out, with 9.1% under the age of 18, 9.1% from 18 to 24, 45.5% from 25 to 44, 18.2% from 45 to 64, and 18.2% who were 65 years of age or older. The median age was 40 years. For every 100 females, there were 120.0 males. For every 100 females age 18 and over, there were 150.0 males.

The median income for a household in the village was $31,875, and the median income for a family was $55,625. Males had a median income of $32,083 versus $0 for females. The per capita income for the village was $23,000. None of the population and none of the families were below the poverty line.
