= Flat Rock Brook Nature Center =

Park in Bergen County, New Jersey, United States of America

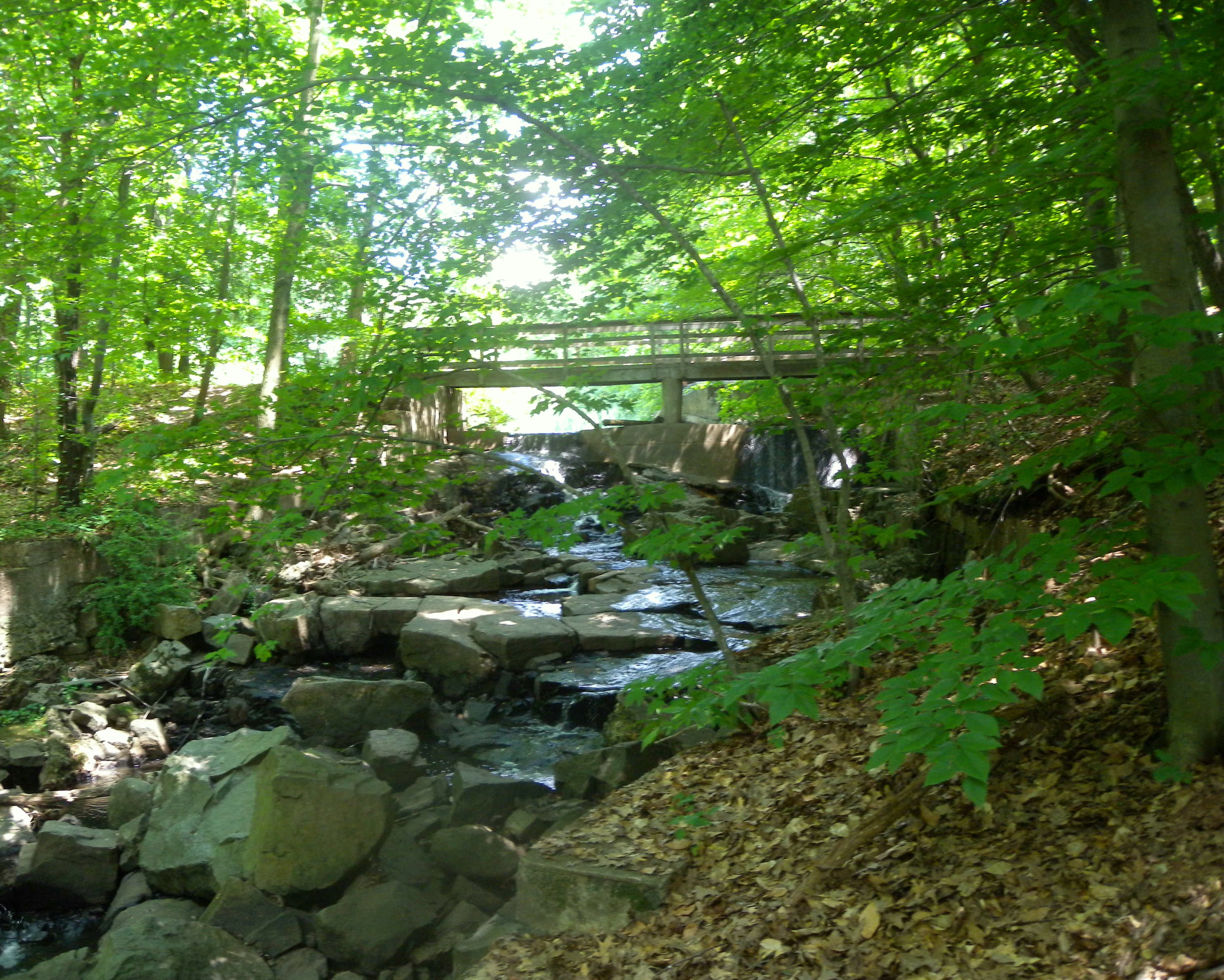
- Bridge over the brook
- Interactive map of Flat Rock Brook Nature Center
- Type: preserve and education center
- Location: 433 Van Nostrand Avenue; Englewood, NJ, USA
- Coordinates: 40°52′22″N 73°57′59″W
- Area: 150 acres (61 ha)
- Created: 1973
- Website: flatrockbrook.org

The Flat Rock Brook Nature Center is a 150-acre (0.61 km^{2}) preserve and education center situated on the western slope of the Palisades in Englewood, New Jersey, United States of America. The center was established in 1973 by citizens who were committed to land conservation and environmental education. This nature center has 3.6 miles of trails.

This natural woodland is one of the last remnants of the Palisades Forest. The Flat Rock Brook Nature Center is managed by the Flat Rock Brook Nature Association. Its purpose is to maintain and preserve the lands under its supervision as a natural sanctuary for plant and animal life in our urban area and as a natural environment available to the public for trail walks, nature study and other passive recreation.

It provides environmental education programs for all ages in order to generate understanding and appreciation of nature and to instill a sense of responsibility and knowledge of the means to protect the natural world and its resources for future generations.

A network of self-guiding trails leads to streams, wetlands, ponds, wildflower meadows, quarry cliffs, woodland, and even a park. Flat Rock Brook trails and picnic area are open free to the public every day from dawn to dusk.
