= Duskin Creek =

Stream in Cape Girardeau County, Missouri, U.S.

Coordinates: 37.458383°N 89.535374°W

Duskin Creek is a stream in Cape Girardeau County in the U.S. state of Missouri.

Duskin Creek most likely has the name of a local family.

== See also ==
- List of rivers of Missouri
