= Flat Rock (Columbus, Georgia) =

Coordinates: 32.5429°N 84.8789°W

Flat Rock is a residential neighborhood located in Columbus, Georgia. In it is Flat Rock Park.
