= Neely's Landing, Missouri =

Unincorporated community in Missouri, U.S.

Neely’s Landing, Missouri
- unincorporated community
- Location of Cape Girardeau, Missouri
- Coordinates: 37°30′08″N 89°30′07″W
- Country: United States
- State: Missouri
- County: Cape Girardeau
- Township: Shawnee Township
- Elevation: 354 ft (108 m)
- Time zone: UTC-6 (Central (CST))
  - Summer (DST): UTC-5 (CDT)
- ZIP code: 63755
- Area code: 573
- FIPS code: 29-67124

Neely's Landing or Neelys Landing is an unincorporated community in Shawnee Township in northern Cape Girardeau County, Missouri, United States. It is located seventeen miles north of Cape Girardeau and is part of the Cape Girardeau–Jackson, MO-IL Metropolitan Statistical Area.

== Etymology ==
Neely's Landing was named after Jacob Neely, who owned and operated a store and ferry at the landing in 1808. The landing was a stop for Mississippi River steam boats carrying passengers and freight on the Mississippi River. The name was given to the town because it was the name known to river boat pilots. The town has been locally referred to simply as Neelys and is often written without the apostrophe.

== History ==
The land around Neely's Landing was owned by John Hays in 1805. Hays operated a ferry known as Hay's Ferry. Jacob Neely started a ferry and store at the landing in 1808. By 1876, the town had 20 residents, and by 1898, the population had risen to 50. The first post office was established in 1860 by R. W. Harris. When the Frisco Railroad came through the town in 1904, the population had doubled due to the need for railroad workers. The Neely's Landing Quarry is located north of the town and extracts limestone.

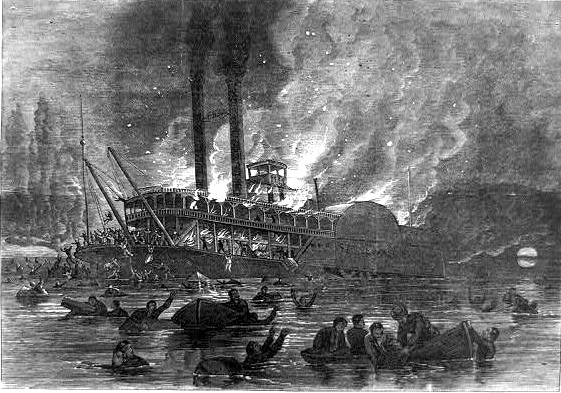
Burning of the steamer Stonewall, at Neely's Landing, 28 October 1869

On October 27, 1869, a tragedy occurred at Neely's Landing when the steamboat The Stonewall, which was carrying 300 passengers and heavily laden with tons of cargo and 200 head of livestock, caught fire. The exact location of the disaster was known to local residents as the Devil’s Tea Table and was even mentioned by Mark Twain in his Life on the Mississippi. The Stonewall was traveling southbound on the Mississippi River near Neely's Landing, its destinations being Cape Girardeau, Memphis and New Orleans. The exact cause of the fire is not known, but reports stated that either a candle fell over on a bale of hay or a lantern had overturned or a match was dropped by accident by a passenger onto hay on the lower deck. By the time the fire was discovered, the fire had spread out of control. When the mate and assistant mates were unable to extinguish the fire, the pilot on orders by the captain turned the boat to shore just below the mouth of Indian Creek, but struck a sandbar in the river. The steamboat then turned with the north wind flaming the fire. The panicked passengers were caught between the flames and the icy cold water, with the Missouri shore only laying 150 feet away. Between 200 and 300 passengers and crew perished in the disaster from either drowning or burning. Local residents pulled bodies out of the water and wrote down the hair color, clothing type, sex and apparent age so families could identify them. Between 60 and 70 victims who were never claimed by relatives were buried in a mass grave on the nearby Cotter farm.
