= Old Appleton, Missouri =

- Village
- Old Appleton's Truss Bridge

- Location of Old Appleton, Missouri
- Coordinates: 37°35′38″N 89°42′39″W
- Country: United States
- State: Missouri
- County: Cape Girardeau
- Township: Apple Creek

Area
  - Total: 0.12 sq mi (0.31 km^{2})
  - Land: 0.12 sq mi (0.31 km^{2})
  - Water: 0 sq mi (0.00 km^{2})
- Elevation: 446 ft (136 m)

Population (2020)
  - Total: 73
  - Density: 604.7/sq mi (233.49/km^{2})
- Time zone: UTC-6 (Central (CST))
  - Summer (DST): UTC-5 (CDT)
- ZIP code: 63770
- Area code: 573
- FIPS code: 29-54200
- GNIS feature ID: 2396830

Old Appleton is a village in Cape Girardeau County, Missouri, United States. The population was 73 at the 2020 census. It is part of the Cape Girardeau–Jackson, MO-IL Metropolitan Statistical Area.

== Name ==
The first settlement was made at Old Appleton in 1824.

The community of Old Appleton was originally known as Apple Creek, named after the stream Apple Creek on which the village is located. By the 1870s the village had become known as Appleton. In 1918, the word "Old" was incorporated into the name to eliminate confusion with Appleton City in St. Clair County, Missouri.

== History ==
Although it is not known who the original native inhabitants were of the Old Appleton area, the area eventually become home to the Shawnee and Delaware Indians. Having originated in present-day Delaware and Pennsylvania, the Shawnee and Delaware Indians had been pushed off their lands by white settlement. In the 1780s, Pierre Louis Lorimier, a French Canadian who had worked as an Indian-interpreter for the British, found it in his best interest to leave the American states. He settled Cape Girardeau in the Ste. Genevieve District with his wife, who was of mixed French and Shawnee ancestry. Lorimier was subsequently made the Indian Agent by the Spanish colonial authorities. Like Lorimier, the Shawnee and Delaware Indians had sided with the British, and found themselves in an unsavory situation. Lorimier appealed for land grants from the Spanish authorities for the settlement of Shawnee and Delaware Indians from American territory.

The Spanish granted Lorimier two large tracts of land in the Apple creek watershed, with the intention of the Shawnee and Delaware acting as a buffer against the Osage Indians, who were not on friendly terms with the Spanish authorities. Lorimer then convinced 1,200 Shawnee and 600 Delaware to relocate to the Apple Creek watershed, and in 1784 the group of Shawnee and Delaware migrated and settled down in the area of Old Appleton. The "Le Grand Village Sauvage" was to the west of present-day Old Appleton and the "Petit Village Sauvage" was to the east of Old Appleton. The Shawnee and Delaware villages had a significant amount of racial mixing with the French, and were said to have as much French ancestry as the French had Indian ancestry. Culturally, the Shawnee and Delaware had largely adopted French and American ways and lifestyles, and had built granaries and barns for the storing of their crops and housing of their cattle and horses. The Shawnee and Delaware built their log homes in the French fashion with posts set together and interstices filled with clay, with wood shingled roofs.

In the early 1800s American settlers began encroaching on the Shawnee and Delaware lands around Apple Creek. In 1807 the Shawnee requested protection from the Osage. Although the Americans had agreed to honor Spanish treaties and articles made with local tribes, the treaties were eventually ignored. In 1809, harassment and stealing by American settlers eventually drove the Shawnee and Delaware to visit the territorial governor Meriwether Lewis and pressed their "long-expressed wish" to exchange of their lands in the Apple Creek watershed with lands farther west. The Shawnee and Delaware stayed, but by 1815 the situation had worsened so much that territorial governor William Clark and US president Madison ordered all white intruders removed from Shawnee and Delaware lands. However, this order was largely ignored by the authorities. By 1816, the encroachment by white settlers left the US Federal Government no choice but to relocate the Shawnee and Delaware to lands further west.

In 1824, John McClain and John Schatz established a settlement on Apple Creek known as "Apple Creek". By the time the post office was established in 1876 the town had become known as Appleton.

Old Appleton was also home to several breweries, among them "The Old Appleton Brewery", until prohibition forced their closures.

In 1982, a flood on Apple creek destroyed McClain Mill and Old Appleton's original bridge. The historic bridge was restored in 2006. The Old Appleton Bridge was listed on the National Register of Historic Places in 2009.

== Geography ==
Old Appleton is located on the south bank of the Apple Creek and the northern border of Cape Girardeau County. Missouri Route 61 passes along the west side of the village. Uniontown lies just over one mile to the north along Route 61 in adjacent Perry County.

According to the United States Census Bureau, the village has a total area of 0.12 square miles (0.31 km^{2}), all land. The town lies on Apple Creek which forms the southern border of Perry County and the northern border of Cape Girardeau County.

== Demographics ==
Historical population
Census	Pop.	Note	%±
1880	100		—
1890	96		−4.0%
1900	99		3.1%
1910	98		−1.0%
1920	106		8.2%
1930	112		5.7%
1940	119		6.3%
1950	120		0.8%
1960	75		−37.5%
1970	77		2.7%
1980	80		3.9%
1990	82		2.5%
2000	82		0.0%
2010	85		3.7%
2020	73		−14.1%
U.S. Decennial Census 2020

=== 2010 census ===
As of the census of 2010, there were 85 people, 27 households, and 23 families living in the village. The population density was 708.3 inhabitants per square mile (273.5/km^{2}). There were 31 housing units at an average density of 258.3 per square mile (99.7/km^{2}). The racial makeup of the village was 100.00% White.

There were 27 households, of which 44.4% had children under the age of 18 living with them, 66.7% were married couples living together, 7.4% had a female householder with no husband present, 11.1% had a male householder with no wife present, and 14.8% were non-families. 14.8% of all households were made up of individuals, and 7.4% had someone living alone who was 65 years of age or older. The average household size was 3.15 and the average family size was 3.39.

The median age in the village was 30.2 years. 30.6% of residents were under the age of 18; 10.7% were between the ages of 18 and 24; 25.9% were from 25 to 44; 21.2% were from 45 to 64; and 11.8% were 65 years of age or older. The gender makeup of the village was 48.2% male and 51.8% female.

=== 2000 census ===
As of the census of 2000, there were 82 people, 28 households, and 22 families living in the town. The population density was 665.8 people per square mile (257.1 people/km^{2}). There were 35 housing units at an average density of 284.2 per square mile (109.7/km^{2}). The racial makeup of the town was 98.78% White, 1.22% from other races. Hispanic or Latino of any race were 1.22% of the population.

There were 28 households, out of which 46.4% had children under the age of 18 living with them, 78.6% were married couples living together, and 17.9% were non-families. 10.7% of all households were made up of individuals, and 3.6% had someone living alone who was 65 years of age or older. The average household size was 2.93 and the average family size was 3.22.

In the town the population was spread out, with 30.5% under the age of 18, 8.5% from 18 to 24, 36.6% from 25 to 44, 17.1% from 45 to 64, and 7.3% who were 65 years of age or older. The median age was 29 years. For every 100 females there were 90.7 males. For every 100 females age 18 and over, there were 103.6 males.

The median income for a household in the town was $47,500, and the median income for a family was $48,125. Males had a median income of $33,750 versus $22,188 for females. The per capita income for the town was $20,894. None of the population and none of the families were below the poverty line.

== Nearby Communities ==
Nearby communities
