= Le Grand Village Sauvage, Missouri =

Coordinates: 37.601°N 89.717°W

- Abandoned village
- Location of Perry County, Missouri
- Country: United States
- State: Missouri
- County: Perry
- Township: Union

Le Grand Village Sauvage (French translation: the big savage village), also called Chalacasa, was a Native American village located near Old Appleton in Perry County, Missouri, United States.

The village was inhabited by Shawnee and Delaware Indian immigrants from Ohio and Indiana.

== Name ==
The Shawnee usually called their villages Chillicothe or Chilliticaux, meaning 'a place of residence.' They named their largest town along Apple Creek Chalacasa, after their old town on the Scioto River in Ohio. The French referred to Chalacasa as Le Grand Village Sauvage (the big savage village) while the Americans referred to Chalacasa as The Big Village or The Big Shawnee Village.

== History ==
=== Immigration ===
In the 18th century, American settlement had forced many Native American tribes westward. The Spanish authorities in Upper Louisiana, also known as the Illinois Country, looked to these tribes as possible immigrants for settlement between Ste. Genevieve and Cape Girardeau.

The Spanish authorities encouraged Shawnee and Delaware immigration, and had hoped their settlement would act as a buffer against the unremitting raids and thefts by the Osage, another tribe to the south, as well as forming a bulwark against the possibility of American invasion. The Shawnee and Delaware, having been driven from their homelands in the Ohio Valley in Pennsylvania, settled in present-day Ohio and Indiana. Then in the 1780s they found themselves in a situation for having supported the British in the American War of Independence, and began looking to move elsewhere as early as 1784. In the 1780s, Don Louis Lorimier, a French-Canadian Métis, who had fought on the side of the British against the Americans during the American Revolution, had also found his situation precarious and decided to settle in Upper Louisiana. Lorimier had operated an Indian trading post in Ohio, and his close association with the Shawnee, enabled him to encourage a number of them to settle in Upper Louisiana. In 1787, Lorimier introduced a plan to bring the disposed Shawnee and Delaware to the Spanish territory.

In 1793, Baron de Carondelet authorized Don Louis Lorimier to establish these tribes in the New Bourbon district of the province of Upper Louisiana, on the Mississippi between the Missouri and Arkansas rivers. Subsequently, the Spanish government authorized Lorimier to induce them to make a settlement in the Spanish territory. The task was made easier on account of Shawnee and Delaware hatred of the Americans, who had conquered them through the victory of General Wayne and the Treaty of Greenville (1795).

=== Settlement ===
The settlements of the Shawnee and the Delaware were principally made between Cinque Hommes and Flora Creeks above Cape Girardeau, and centered around Apple Creek bordering Perry County and Cape Girardeau County. The concession granted them by the Spanish contained approximately 750 square miles, which included extensive prairies and woodland, karst plains and alluvial bottoms. The tract was large enough to support several Indian villages with surrounding hunting territory, although these semi-Americanized Indians were more dependent on field crops and domesticated animals than wild game.

The tribes were accustomed to acting together in important matters, but they established separate villages. The largest Shawnee village, le Grand Village Sauvage, contained about 400 inhabitants, and was built on the top of a hill above Apple Creek, to the west of the present site of Old Appleton. A trace, or small road, called the Shawnee Trace, extended from Don Louis Lorimier's trading post in Cape Girardeau to Le Grand Village Sauvage and continued north to La Saline, Ste. Genevieve and St. Louis. This trace was part of the Royal Road (Le Chemin du Roi) connecting several administrative posts of Upper Louisiana, and the Indian villages experienced a considerable amount of through them by officials and outsiders.

By 1804, the land had become too settled to afford sufficient game. Although the Shawnee and Delaware interpreted the entire grant as being exclusively theirs and excluding Americans, district commandants awarded concessions to white settlers within and as close as three miles to the villages. Apparently, the commandments assumed that it was their right to approve locations on unoccupied land, and they could have interpreted the miles of hunting land around the villages as unoccupied in the sense that other land in the district used by Americans for hunting was considered unoccupied. Instructions to award only land not in conflict with other concessions, which were so rigorously adhered to everywhere else, apparently did not hold for the Indian tract. By the end of the Spanish period, the tract contained approximately one hundred whites living on dispersed farms, most on the fringes of the tract.

The Shawnee and Delaware protested these incursions, but there was little they could do, as they had little influence with authorities beyond Lorimier. The first whites within the tract apparently did not disturb them, and some even served them as useful gunsmiths while other craftsmen traded with them.

Even under protest the Shawnee and Delaware fulfilled the purposes for which the Spanish invited their immigration. They were effective turning away the Osage and were used for the same purpose by the Americans as a buffer between the Osage and Cherokee years later in Oklahoma. From early on, the Shawnee said that Spanish Illinois (Upper Louisiana) was not a tranquil place due to the Osages, and they threatened to return to the United States. The Shawnee were particularly disturbed that the Spanish expected them to fight the Osages, while at the same time, the Spanish continued to trade and bestow gifts on the Osages, but offered no aid to the Shawnee and Delaware when they were attacked by the Osages.

=== Witch-Hunts ===
A Shawnee medicine man named, Tenskwátawa, known to the Whites as "the Shawnee prophet," began to preach a new doctrine which exhorted the Indians to return to the communal life of their ancestors, abandoning all customs derived from the Whites. He attracted a large following among Indians who had already suffered major epidemics and dispossession of their lands. In 1805, Tenskwátawa led a religious revival following a series of witch-hunts following an outbreak of smallpox among the Shawnee.

These witch-hunts eventually reached the Shawnee in Upper Louisiana, and about 1808−1809, the Native American communities along Apple Creek became possessed with the belief that witchcraft was practiced among them and consequently burned to death some 50 women within 12 months. The charges against the women were usually based upon the report of someone who claimed he had seen the alleged witch in the form of an owl or some other bird, or in the form of a panther or beast of the forest. The frenzy was suddenly quelled by the appearance of Tecumseh, who was then busy with his plans to form a vast confederacy of all Indians, to check the advance of the white settlers.

=== American Encroachment ===
Between 1811 and 1814 trouble began grow with white settlement. Missouri's white population more than doubled between 1804 and 1814 as many white settlers crossed the Mississippi, leading to increasing harassment of the villages along Apple Creek. Between 1811 and 1814, the Shawnees along Apple Creek reported the loss of over sixty-five hogs, forty-nine cattle, and forty-eight horses. Apple Creek chief, Wapapilethe, upon returning from the winter hunt, found his house had been broken open and everything inside had been stolen. Wapapilethe personally knew a white man who had illegally settled on this property and robbed both him and other Shawnees, but could legally do nothing as Indians were barred from testifying against whites in court. The Apple Creek Shawnees, being legally powerless to stop the harassment and thefts, complained that "the whites do not steal these things merely for their value, but more to make us abandon our land and take if for themselves." In another case a Shawnee man had been beaten by a white who then confiscated his land and property. Despite the overwhelming evidence and protests from both the Shawnees and Pierre Menard, a country judge refused to prosecute the man and allowed the statute of limitations for his crimes to pass.

=== Emigration and Removal ===
Despite the fact that the Spanish government, and later the American government, granted the Indians title to their lands, and had ordered all whites to move from their lands, a number of the Shawnee and Delaware slowly moved west before the advance of the whites, establishing communities further west in Missouri, in Stoddard and Greene counties.

In the treaty made at St. Louis in 1815, the American government ordered all whites to move from the Shawnee and Delaware lands. This measure, however, was only of temporary relief. Between 1815 and 1819, the Shawnee population in southeastern Missouri plummeted from 1,200 to only 400. Only ten years after the signing of the Treaty of St. Louis the encroachment of white settlers had compelled these tribes to sell their Spanish grant and leave the State for a home farther west.

Missouri entered the union as the 24th state in 1821, and the federal government, in 1825, moved to extinguish any remaining Shawnee claims under the Spanish land grant. In November the 1,400 Shawnee in Missouri agreed to a treaty signed at St. Louis with William Clark, exchanging their lands along Apple Creek, near Cape Girardeau, for 2,500 square miles in eastern Kansas. They also received $14,000 in moving expenses plus $11,000 to pay debts owed to white traders. Further provision was made to allow any of the 800 Ohio Shawnee who so desired to join them in Kansas. When they settled on the south side of the Kansas River the following year, the Shawnee became the first of the eastern Algonquin tribes to settle in Kansas. Problems arose, however, when the very traditional Black Bob's band balked at uniting with the Ohio Shawnee. Instead of moving to Kansas after the treaty, they went south and settled in Arkansas. During the next two years, all efforts (including bribery) failed to persuade them to move. After threat of military force, they settled at Olathe in 1833.

== Population ==
The New Bourbon census of 1797 reported 70 Shawnee and 120 Delaware families in villages on the north side of Apple Creek in the New Bourbon Administrative district. Possibly as many families lived in the villages south of Apple Creek. Le Grand Village Sauvage had approximately 400 inhabitants. A combined population of 3,000 Shawnee and Delaware were estimated to live in these communities between Cinque Hommes and Flora creeks.

The Shawnee and Delaware on Apple Creek had a significant degree of racial mixing and had adopted French and American ways. The racial mixing included half whites of both French and American parentage, and whites, probably orphans and captives from warfare, who had been raised as Indians according to the Shawnee practice of adopting their captives. It was noted at the time by Spanish officials that the Apple Creek villages certainly had as much “white blood” in them as French villages had “Indian blood.”

== Architecture and Community ==
Some houses were log constructed in the vertical French poteaux en terre (posts-in-the-ground) or poteaux-sur-sol (post-on-a-sill) style, with perpendicular log posts set closely together in the ground or on a sill, and with clay chinked in-between filling the interstices. Other houses were built in the American log cabin style, with horizontal squared logs, some two stories high and shingled. There were granaries and barns for cattle and horses. Villages gave the appearance of permanence. Cultivated fields of corn, barley, pumpkins, melons, and potatoes, enclosed by rail fences, surrounded the villages. The Shawnee and Delaware had barnyard fowl, cattle, hogs, and horses.

The Shawnee and Delaware were attentive to dress, and the women wore their hair tied close to their heads and covered with skin. They were more careful of their children, more than associated with other Indians. They also cut the cartilages of their ears so as to lengthen them as much as possible, and suspended silver trinkets in the form of stars from their ears. On their necks they wore crosses, and on their heads they wore bands and crowns covered with spangles. They used great quantities of vermilion and black, with which they painted their bodies on festive days.
