= Millheim, Missouri =

Unincorporated community in Missouri, U.S.

- unincorporated community
- Location of Perry County, Missouri
- Coordinates: 37°37′03″N 89°53′14″W
- Country: United States
- State: Missouri
- County: Perry
- Township: Cinque Hommes
- Elevation: 594 ft (181 m)
- Time zone: UTC-6 (Central (CST))
  - Summer (DST): UTC-5 (CDT)
- ZIP code: 63775
- Area code: 573
- FIPS code: 29-48372
- GNIS feature ID: 722402

Millheim is an unincorporated settlement in Cinque Hommes Township in Perry County, Missouri, United States.

== Etymology ==
The name Millheim is most probably an American corruption of the German Müllheim, meaning ‘mill home’. One theory is that the name was conferred on the mill, although it is possible the name is taken from one of the cities in Germany's Rhine or Ruhr regions, or is one of the German names brought by the Saxon migration to Perry County.

== History ==
A well-known mill was built at the present-site of Millheim as early as 1856 by Rudolph Conrad and Mike Eddleman, and a post office was established in 1891.

== Geography ==
Millheim is situated in Cinque Hommes Township, and is located approximately eight miles south of Perryville.
