= Shawnee Creek (Apple Creek tributary) =

Stream in the U.S. state of Missouri

Coordinates: 37.576717°N 89.593987°W

Shawnee Creek is a stream in Cape Girardeau County in the U.S. state of Missouri. It is a tributary of Apple Creek.

Shawnee Creek was named after the Shawnee Indians.

== See also ==
- List of rivers of Missouri
