= Bois Brule Creek (Cinque Hommes Creek tributary) =

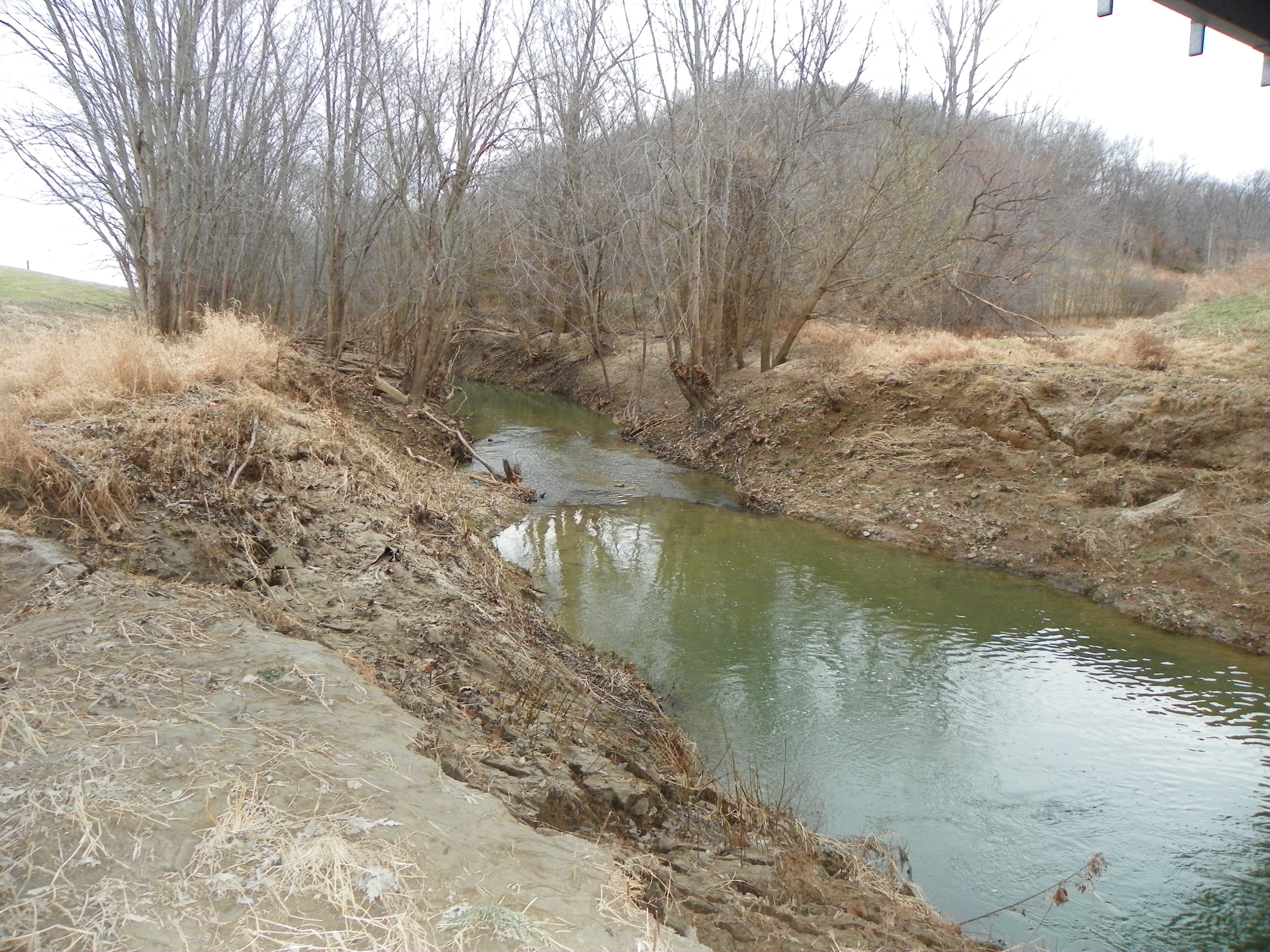
- Etymology: French for “Burnt Wood”

Location
- Country: United States
- State: Missouri

Physical characteristics
- Mouth: Mississippi River
  - location: Mississippi River, MO
  - coordinates: 37°47′20″N 89°44′50″W
  - elevation: 354 ft (108 m)

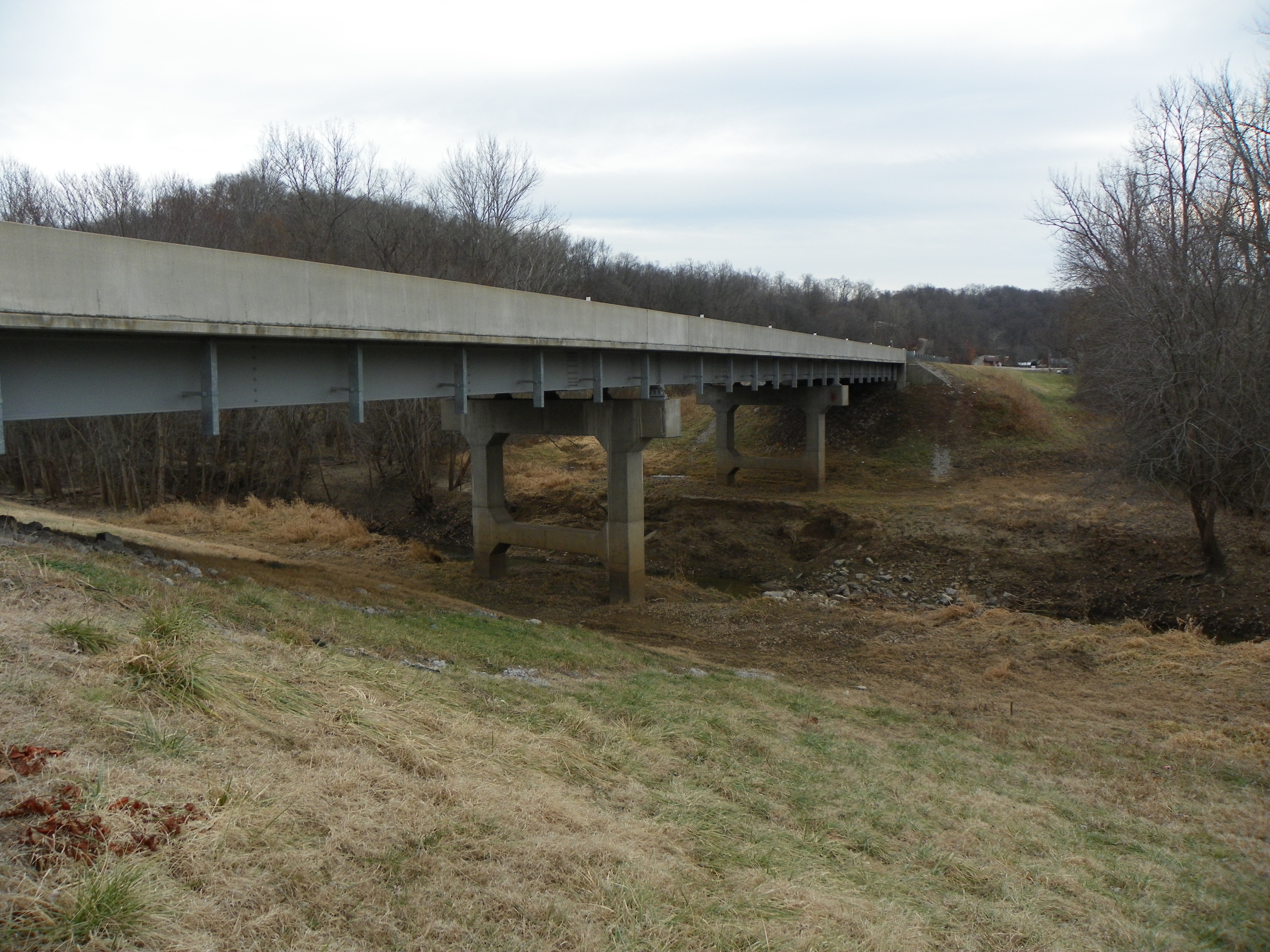
Highway 51 bridge at McBride, Missouri

Bois Brule Creek is a tributary of Cinque Hommes Creek in Perry County, Missouri.

== Name ==
The name Bois Brule (French: Bois Brûlé) means “Burnt Wood” was given to both the creek and the flood plain by early French settlers. The name was applied by the French to describe a burnt tract of forest found in the area.

== Physical geography ==
Bois Brule Creek is a tributary of Cinque Hommes Creek and flows into Cinque Hommes Creek in Bois Brule Bottoms north of Menfro, Missouri at 354 feet (108 meters). The stream's feature ID is 741394. A number of drainage ditches empty into Bois Brule Creek, draining excess water out of Bois Brule Bottoms.

=== Tributaries ===
- Blue Spring Branch
- McClanahan Creek

== Cultural geography ==
Bridges that traverse Bois Brule Creek are the Bois Brule Creek CR 212 Bridge, the Bois Brule Creek CR 216 Bridge, the Route E Mystery Bridge, and the Route 51 Bois Brule Bridge at McBride, Missouri.

== History ==
The first European settlers in the vicinity of Bois Brule Creek were French colonial settlers. However, in 1798, a number of Irish Catholics were given permission to settle in the Bois Brule area. The Bois Brule Township was organized in 1821 and named after the creek and bottoms, and was one of Perry County's original three townships.

== Communities ==
- McBride

== See also ==
- List of rivers of Missouri
