= Bois Brule Creek =

Bois Brule Creek may refer to:

- Bois Brule Creek (Cinque Hommes Creek), a stream in Missouri
- Bois Brule Creek (Osage River), a stream in Missouri
