= St. John the Evangelist Roman Catholic Church =

St. John the Evangelist Roman Catholic Church may refer to:

- St. John the Evangelist Roman Catholic Church (Baltimore, Maryland), listed on the National Register of Historic Places in Baltimore, Maryland
- St. John the Evangelist Roman Catholic Church (Lithium, Missouri)
- St. John the Evangelist Roman Catholic Church (Zigzag, Oregon), listed on the National Register of Historic Places in Clackamas County, Oregon
