= Bois Brule Bottom =

Floodplain in Missouri, U.S.

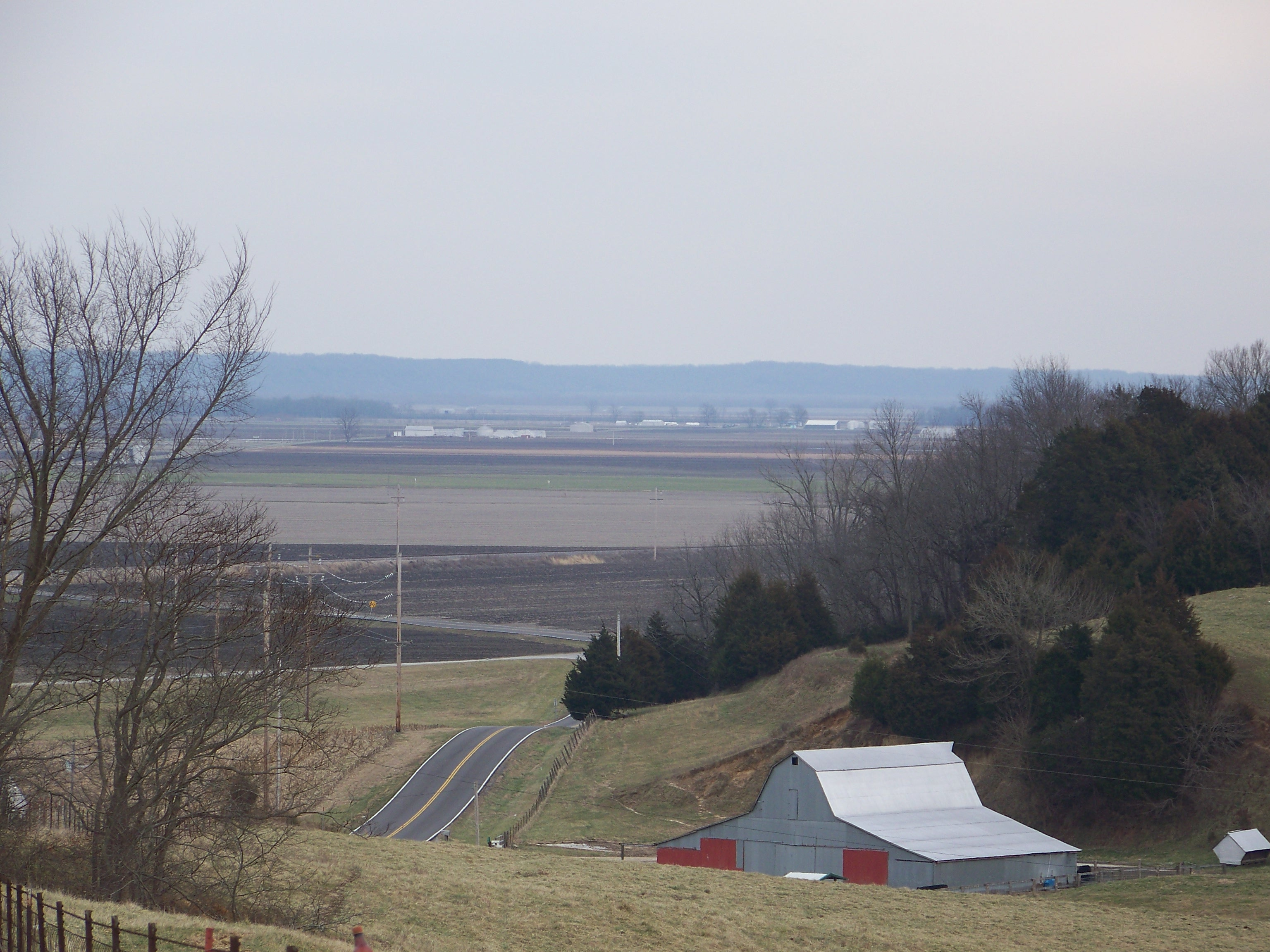
- Bois Brule Bottoms
- Interactive map of Bois Brule Bottom
- Type: Alluvial floodplain
- Location: Perry County, Missouri, United States
- Coordinates: 37.84°N 89.79°W

The Bois Brule Bottom (French: Bois Brûlé) is an alluvial floodplain in Bois Brule Township in Perry County, Missouri stretching between Bois Brule Creek to the west and the Mississippi River to the east.

The American Bottom stretches from St. Louis south along the east side of the Mississippi River all the way to the mouth of the Kaskaskia River, just north of Fort Kaskaskia, Illinois. At Morrow Island the American Bottom is broken by the Mississippi River, and on the west side of the Mississippi River the alluvial plain continues as the "Le Grande Champ" or Big Field Bottom, which includes Kaskaskia Island. South of Kaskaskia Island the alluvial flood plain continues on as the Bois Brule Bottom. The Bois Brule Bottom is bounded on the north by an old channel of the Mississippi River which flows around Kaskaskia Island, and is bounded on the south by Cinque Hommes Creek (also known as St. Cosme creek), with the Mississippi River lying to the east. The Brazeau Bottom continues further south along west side of the Mississippi River.

== Etymology ==
Bois Brûlé, French for "Burnt Wood" was given to the flood plain by early French settlers. The name was applied by the French to describe a burnt tract of forest.

== History ==
=== Indigenous people ===
The first Native American groups known to have inhabited the area were the Mound Builders. The Mound Builders constructed large earthen mounds in the area, particularly along the Mississippi River. By the 12th and 13th centuries, the Mississippian culture was in decline and eventually disappeared. Later Native American groups in the Bois Brule Bottom area were the Kaskaskia Indians who originated from the area of present-day Peoria, Illinois, but had migrated south to the area of Kaskaskia, Illinois. In the late 1770s and 1780s, remnants of the Illinois Nation, the Peoria tribe, left the east bank of the Mississippi River to escape British and American oppression, with some settling in New Ste. Genevieve and about 100 settling in the Bois Brule Bottom.

=== French settlement ===
The first Europeans to colonize the Middle Mississippi River region were the French. Both the present-day Illinois and Missouri shores along the Mississippi River were referred to as the Illinois Country and was governed as a district of New France. A number of Métis and French colonial communities had been established just to the north of Bois Brule Bottom: Kaskaskia, Ste. Genevieve, Chartres, Prairie du Rocher, Nouvelle Bourbon, and St. Phillipe. In 1763, the Spanish gained control of the Upper Louisiana and ruled the area as a part of New Spain. Among the first settlers in Bois Brule was Jean Baptiste Barsaloux, a traveling merchant, who lived in the Bois Brule Bottom in 1787, and applied to the Spanish Colonial officials for a concession for himself and his father Girard Barsaloux.

=== American settlement ===
In the late 1700s and early 1800s the Spanish authorities granted American Catholics from Kentucky, also known as Maryland Catholics, to settle in the Bois Brule Bottom. These Maryland Catholics included Levy Wiggins, William Boyce, and Isadore Moore. The American Catholics chose to live separately from the French and Creoles in the district, and many had left the bottoms by 1820. A number of other Americans also settled in Bois Brule Bottom. The Fenwick Settlement was founded in the late 1790s by Maryland Catholics who had previously settled in Kentucky. These included the Fenwick brothers: Walter, Ezekial, Thomas and James.

Another group of settlers were Irish Catholics who settled in the late 1790s along Bois Brule Creek. Despite the fertile soil, early settlers faced a number of problems. The land was level with thick gluey soil, which led to bayous, mosquitos, chills, malaria, typhoid and brain fever, to name a few of the maladies.

In 1804 ownership of the territory of Upper Louisiana was transferred to the United States, and by the 1820s American settlers began pouring into the region. After Missouri statehood in 1821, Bois Brule Bottom, originally part of the Ste. Genevieve District, was reorganized as a township in Perry County, Missouri.

== Floods ==
Flooding has been a constant concern of residents of Bois Brule Bottom since settlement began. Under French and Spanish colonial administration, each settler was required to build and maintain levees on his land. Significant number of floods occurred throughout the 1800s and 1900s, but the Great Flood of 1993 devastated the Bois Brule Bottom. Most of the communities failed to recover.

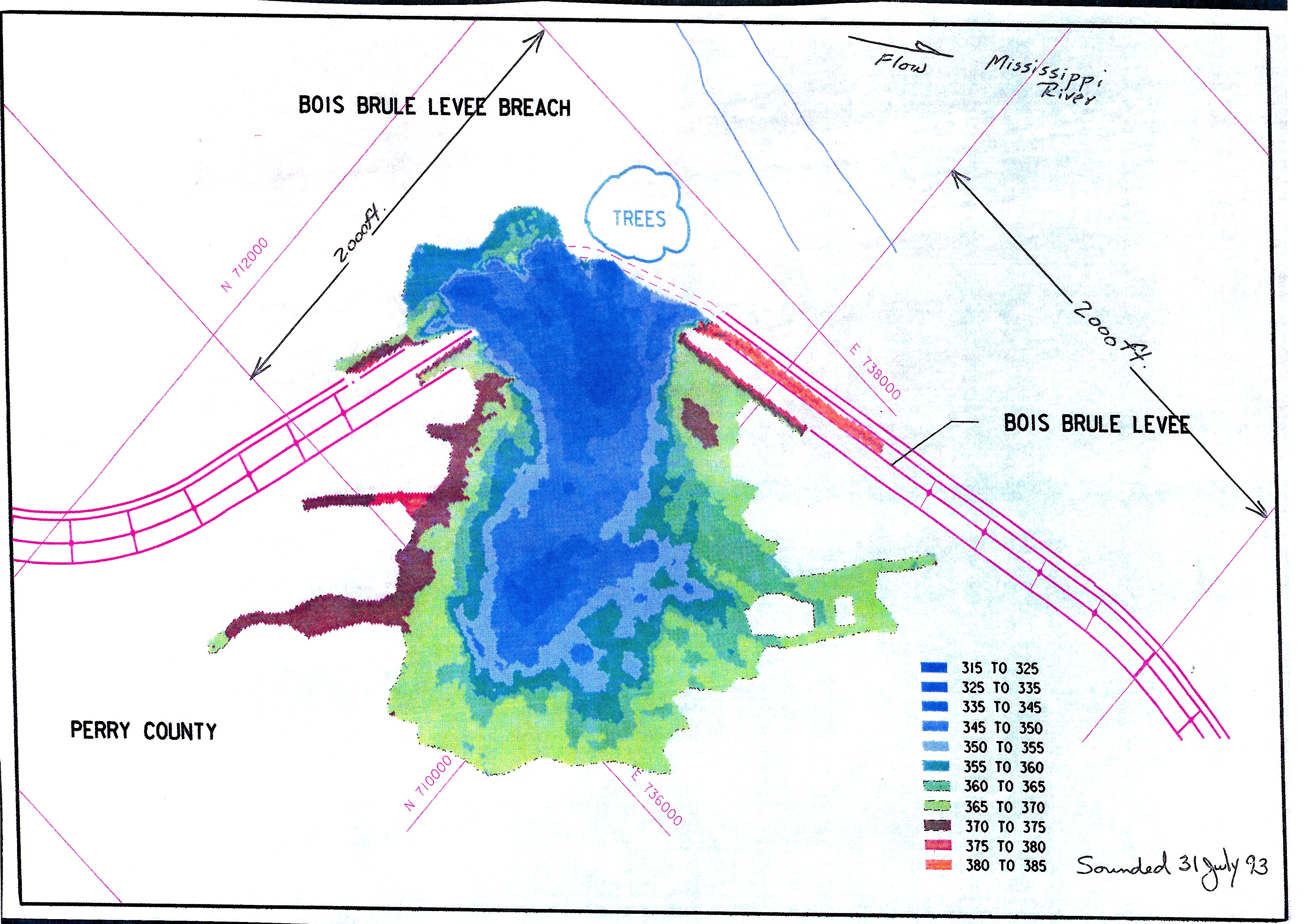
An illustrated map of the Bois Brule Bottoms Levee Breach, Flood of 1993

The US Army Corps of Engineers operates the Bois Brule Levee and Drainage District, and cares for the maintenance of the levees and chutes.

== Geography ==
The Bois Brule Bottom has an elevation of 360 ft. (109 m.) The bottomland is approximately six miles wide and eighteen miles long, with very rich soil, very suited to farming. Bois Brule Bottom is bordered to the north by the Old River, which is the old channel of the Mississippi River that had shifted course following the Great Flood of 1844 and separates Bois Brule Bottom from Kaskaskia Island. Cinque Hommes Creek forms the border to the south, with Bois Brule Creek and the Mississippi bluffs bordering along the west, and the Mississippi River to the east.

== Gallery ==
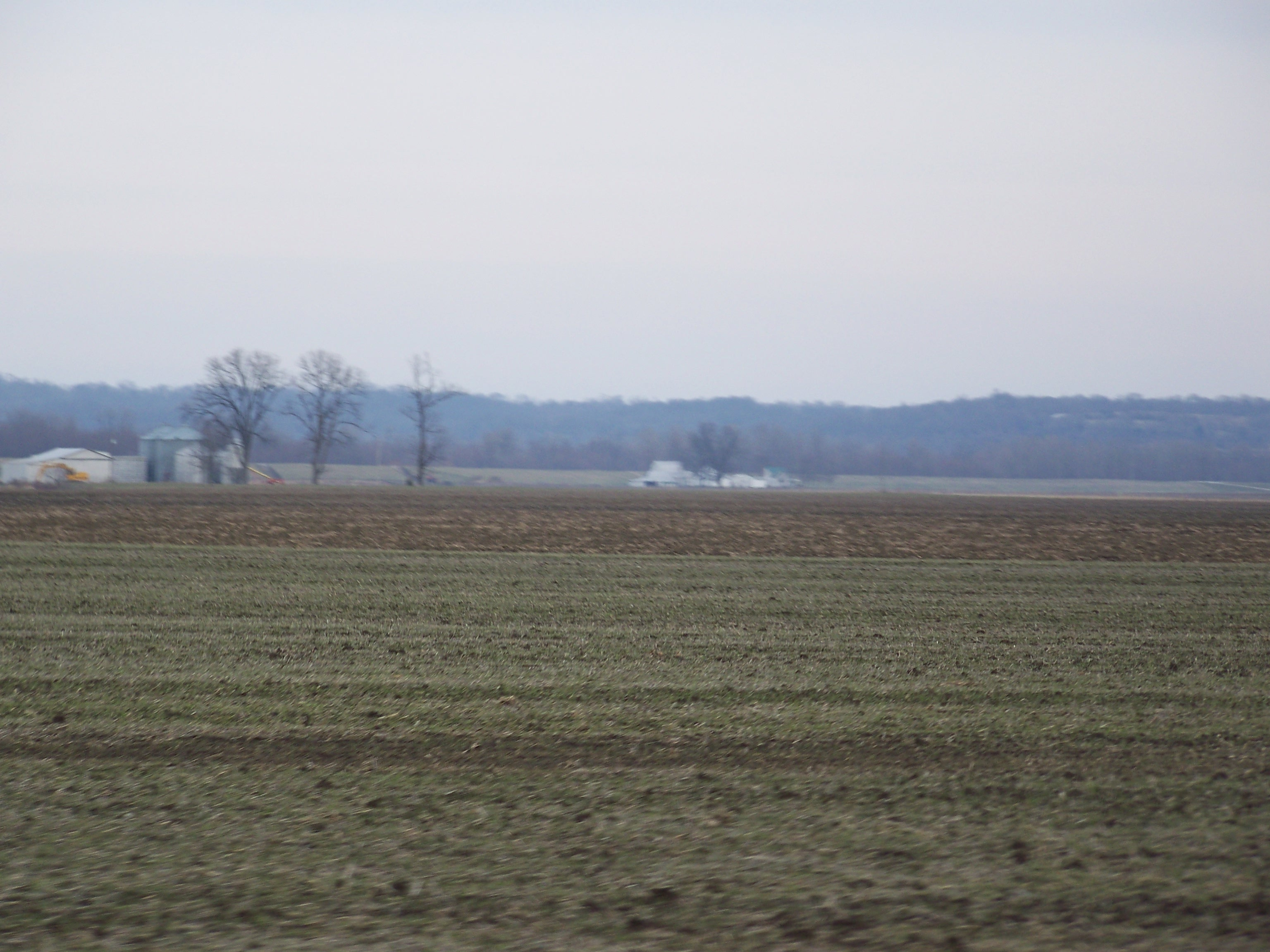
Bois Brule Bottoms

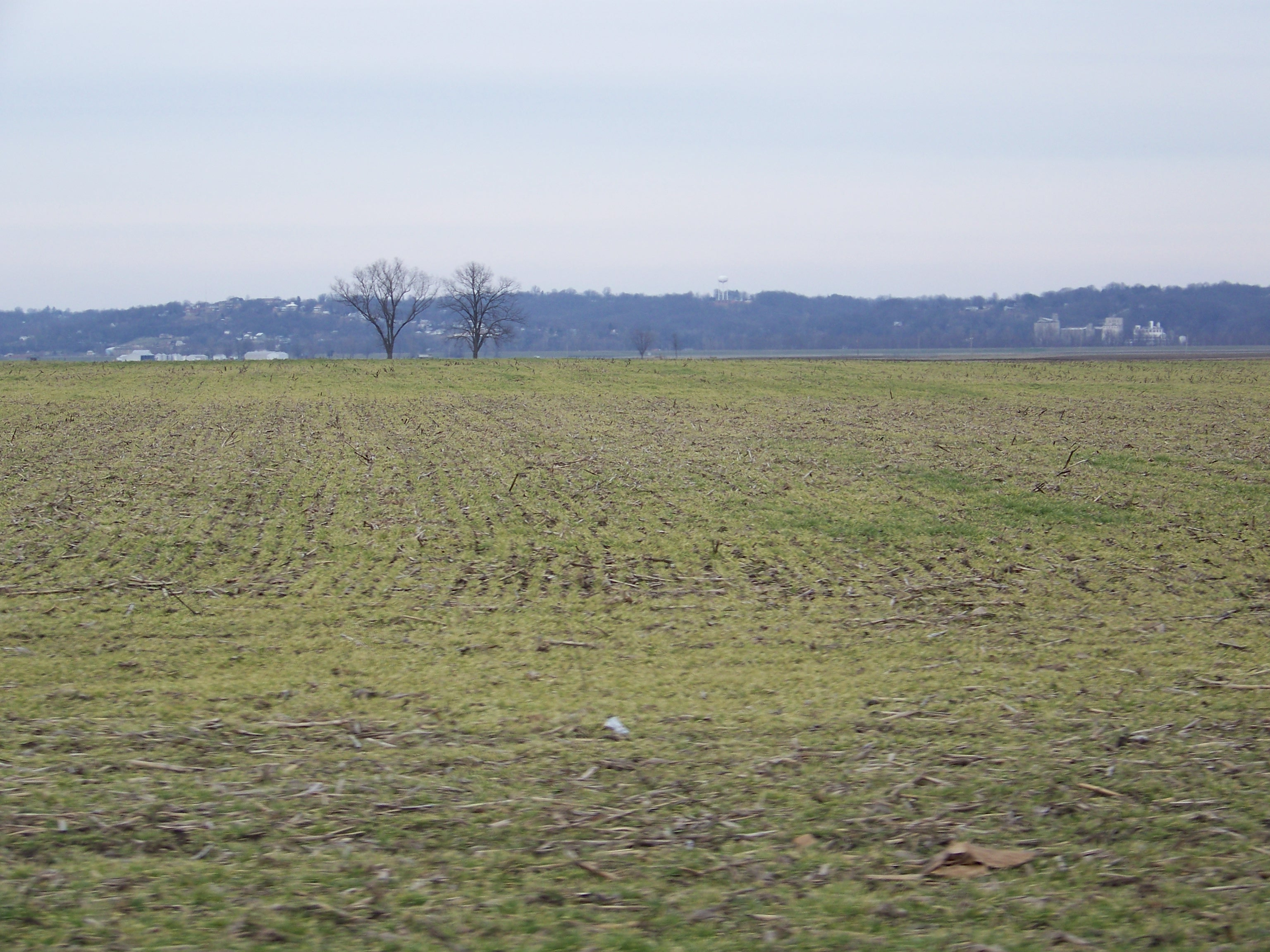
Fields in Bois Brule

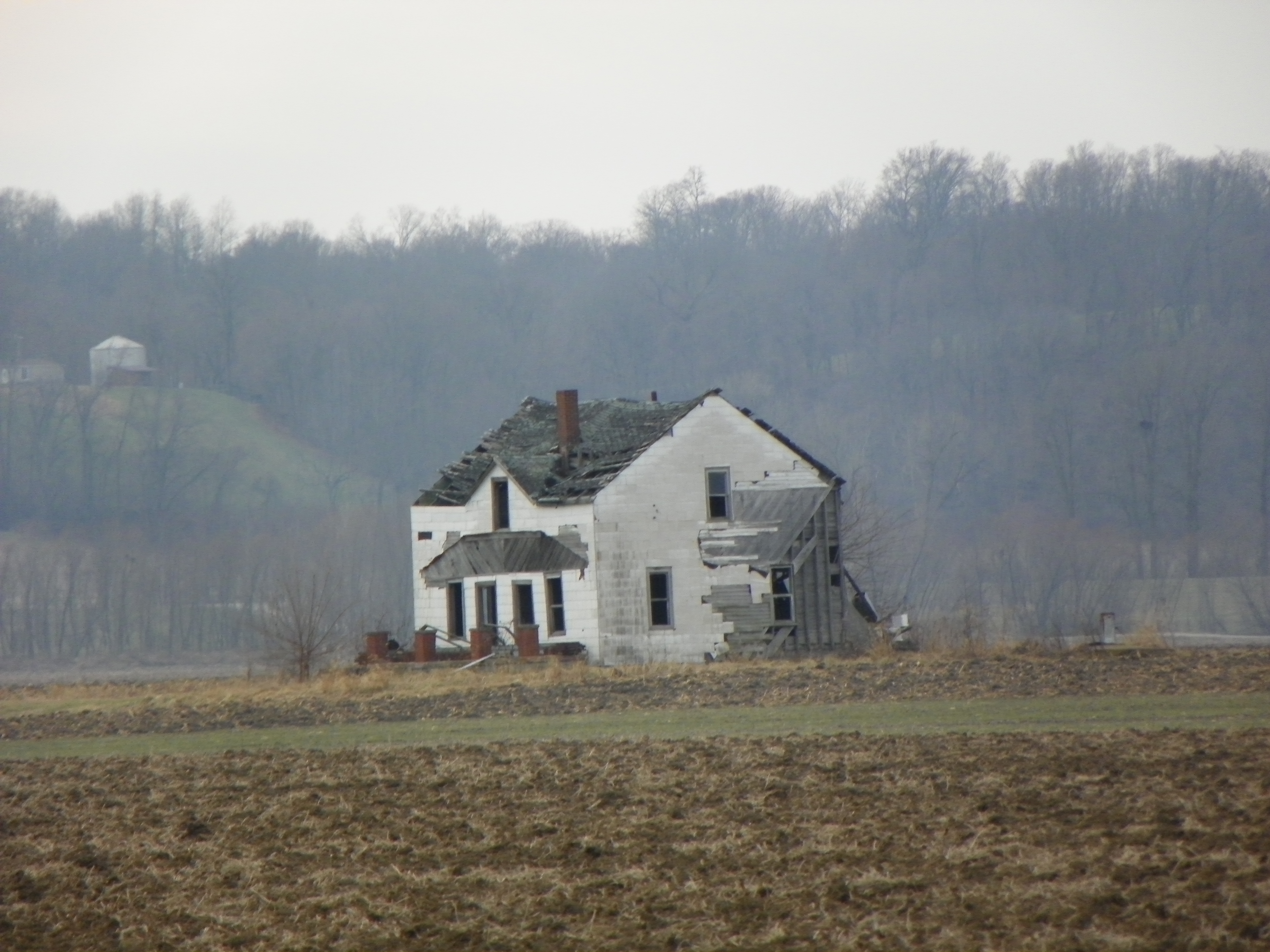
Abandoned flooded out house

== Communities in the Bois Brule Bottom ==
- Belgique
- Claryville
- McBride
- Menfro

== See also ==
- Perry County, Missouri
- American Bottom
- Brazeau Bottom
- Le Grand Champ Bottom
