= Claryville =

Clayrville may refer to:

- Claryville, Kentucky
- Claryville, Missouri
- Claryville, New York
