= The Nativity of the Blessed Virgin Mary, Roman Catholic Church (Belgique, Missouri) =

The Nativity of the Blessed Virgin Mary, Roman Catholic Church (Belgique Missouri)
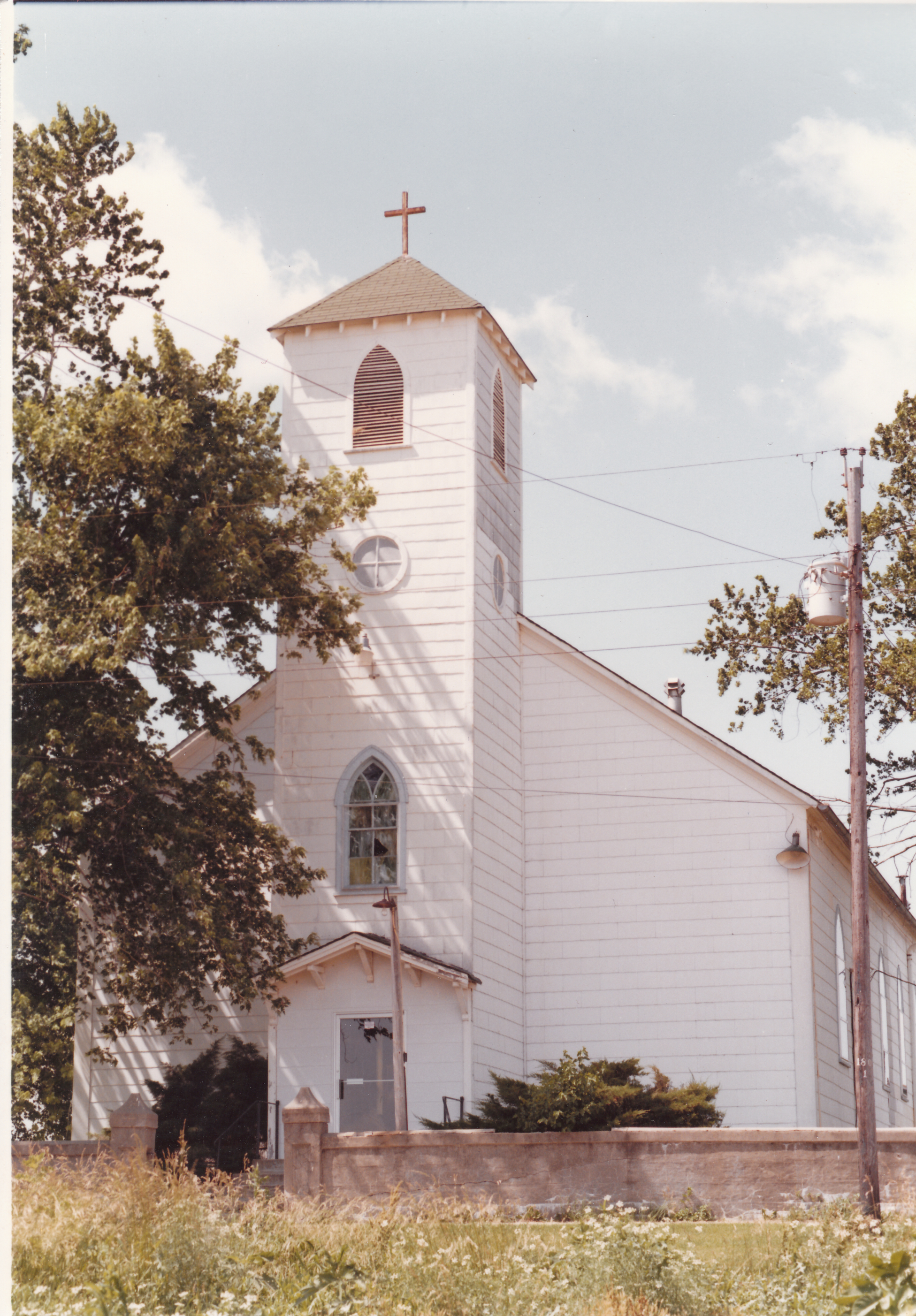

- Location within Missouri
- 37°50′15″N 89°46′52″W
- Location: Belgique, Missouri
- Country: United States
- Denomination: Roman Catholic Church

History
- Founded: 1884
- Consecrated: 1884

Architecture
- Groundbreaking: 1884
- Completed: 1885

Administration
- Archdiocese: Archdiocese of St. Louis

The Nativity of the Blessed Virgin Mary Church was a Roman Catholic church in Belgique, Missouri, United States.

== History ==
The Nativity of the Blessed Virgin Mary Church was founded in 1884 by Catholic settlers from Belgium. Father D.L. De Ceumynck, an immigrant from Belgium, served as the church's first priest. The first church building was erected in 1885. In 1893 a new church was built and the older building was then used as the school. In 1963, the pastor at Belgique was assigned to administer to the Catholics at Claryville and Sereno parishes. In 1966, Belgique and Sereno were made missions of the Vincentian priests at Perryville. The Nativity of the Blessed Virgin Mary was closed in 1993, and its parishioners were invited to join the faith community at Our Lady of Victory in Sereno.

== Cemetery ==
The Nativity of the Blessed Virgin Mary Cemetery, also known as Belgique Catholic Cemetery, lies just south of Belgique along highway 51.

== Gallery ==
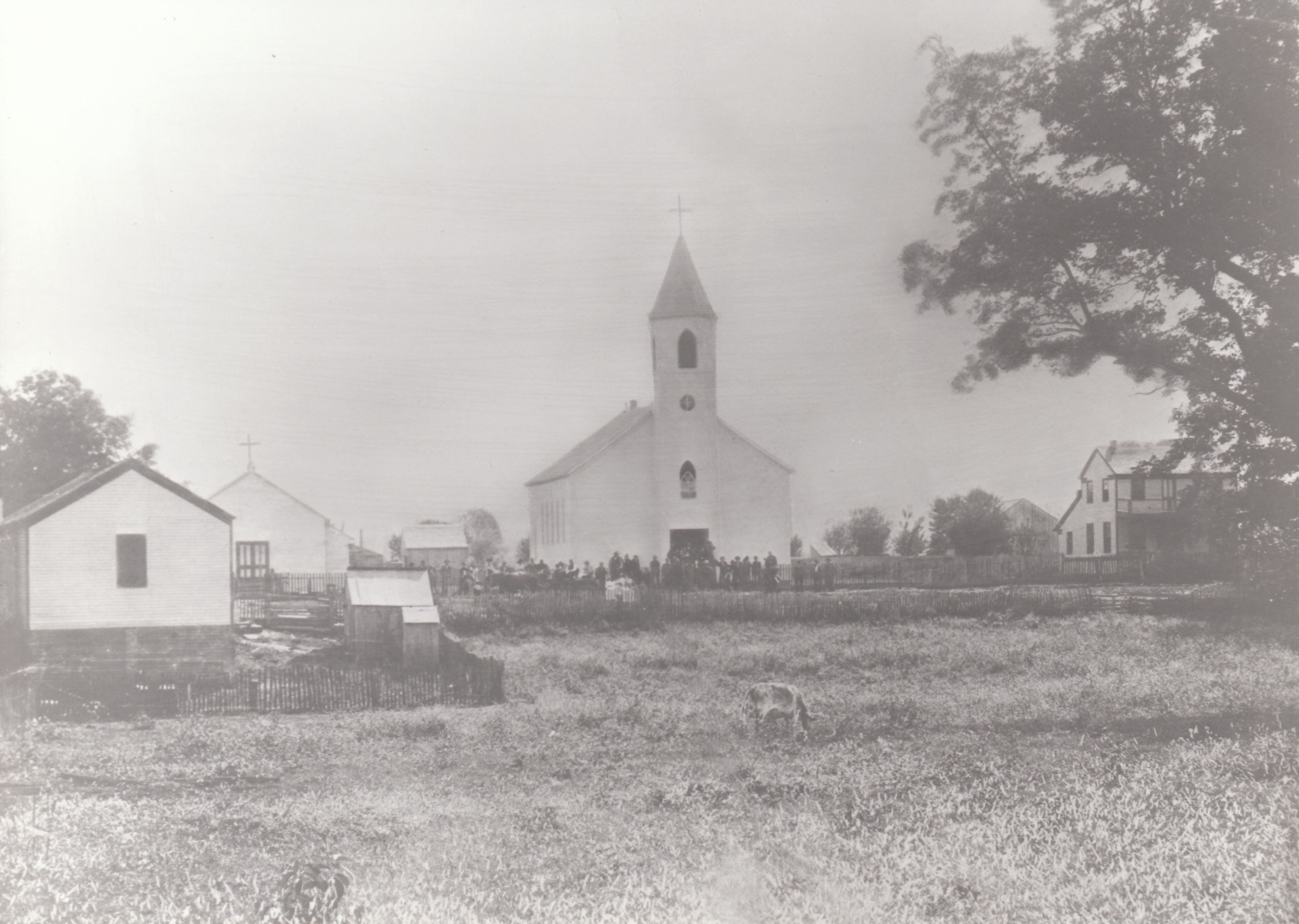
NBVM, 19th century

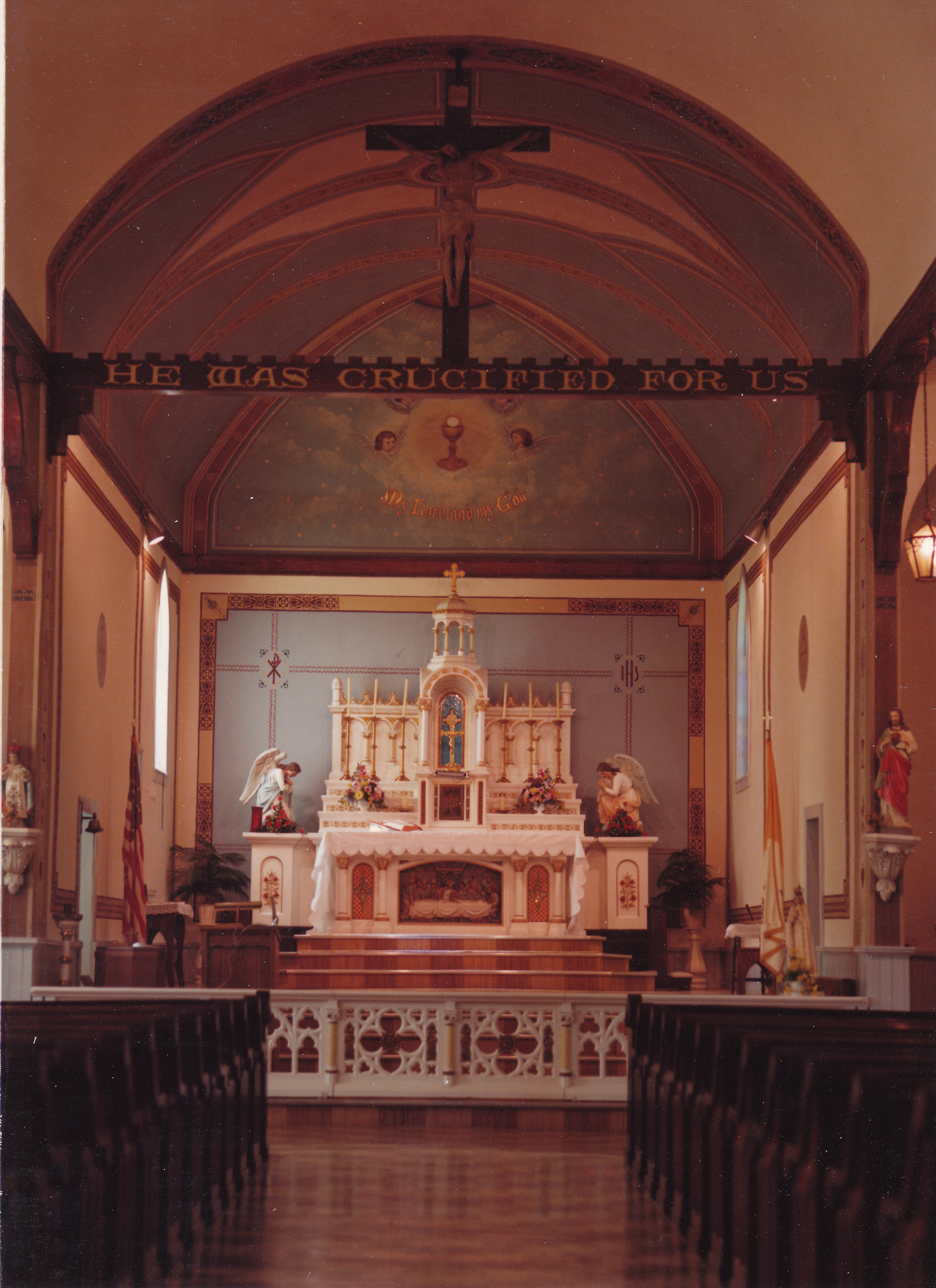
Interior of the NBVM, Belgique, 1984

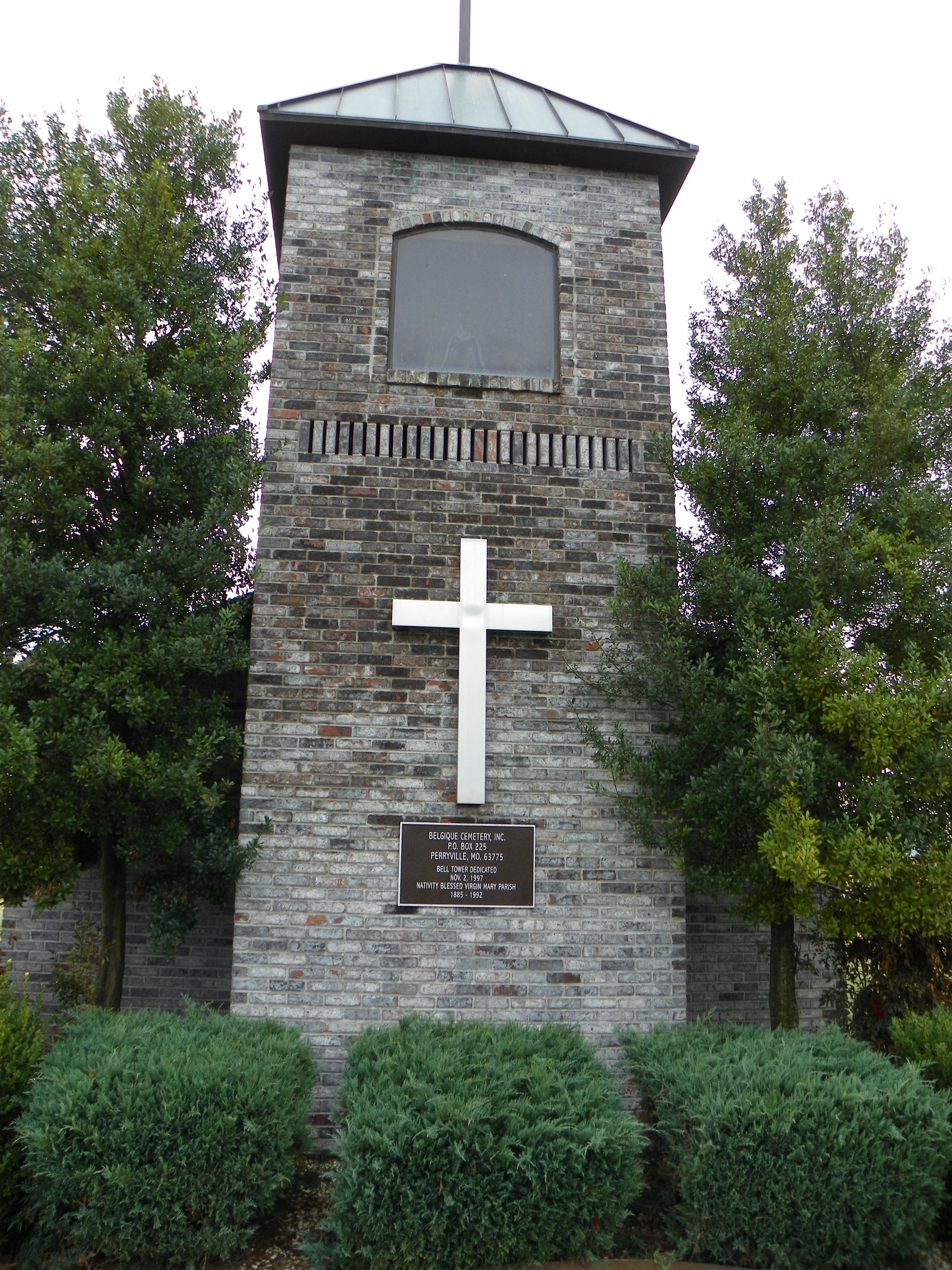
NBVM Cemetery Shrine
