= McBride, Missouri =

Unincorporated community in Missouri, U.S.

- unincorporated community
- Location of Perry County, Missouri
- Coordinates: 37°49′58″N 89°50′24″W
- Country: United States
- State: Missouri
- County: Perry
- Township: Bois Brule
- Elevation: 371 ft (113 m)
- Time zone: UTC-6 (Central (CST))
  - Summer (DST): UTC-5 (CDT)
- ZIP code: 63775
- Area code: 573
- FIPS code: 29-44786
- GNIS feature ID: 722028

McBride is an unincorporated community located in Bois Brule Township in Perry County, Missouri, United States. McBride is located approximately eight miles northeast of Perryville.

== Etymology ==
McBride was named after the McBride family, who were prominent landowners in the area.

== History ==
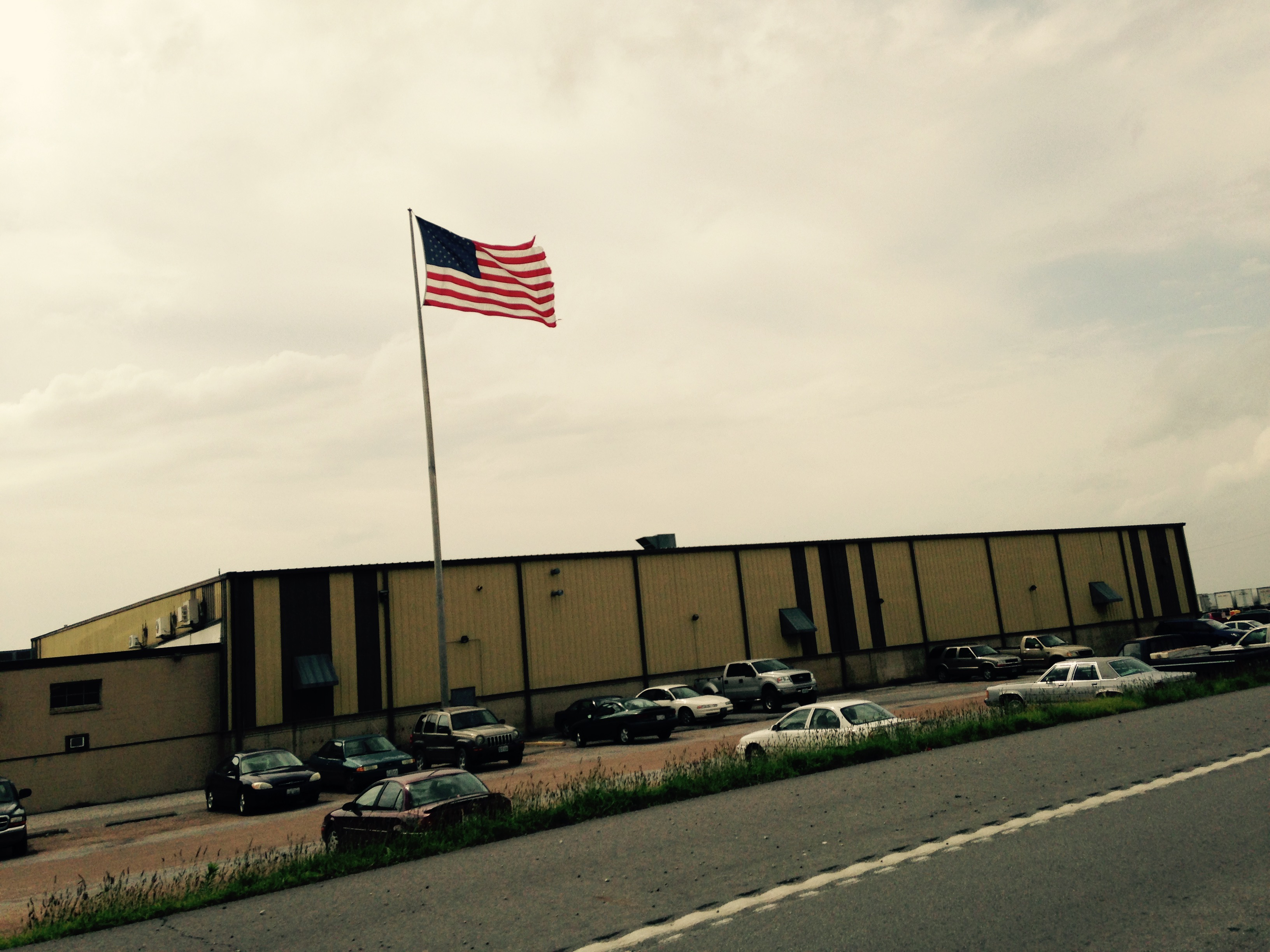
Gilster-Mary Lee

The first settlers in the area around McBride were the McBride family, headed by Stephan McBride, who came to Perry County in 1837. The McBrides were natives of Nelson and Marion counties, Kentucky. The town grew up along the Frisco Rail line and had its own depot. The flood of 1993 destroyed much of the community. Today, McBride is home to the Gilster-Mary Lee Popcorn and Cereal plant.

== Flooding ==
A number of floods over the years have left destruction on McBride, but the Great Flood of 1993 had devastated the community.

== Geography ==
McBride is situated in the Bois Brule Bottom along Bois Brule Creek. The nutrient-rich bottomland made the land ideal for agriculture.
