= Lithium, Missouri =

Unincorporated community in Missouri, U.S.

- Census-designated place
- Location of Lithium, Missouri
- Coordinates: 37°49′58″N 89°53′05″W
- Country: United States
- State: Missouri
- County: Perry
- Township: Saline
- Incorporated: 1883

Area
  - Total: 0.78 sq mi (2.01 km^{2})
  - Land: 0.77 sq mi (1.99 km^{2})
  - Water: 0.0077 sq mi (0.02 km^{2})
- Elevation: 381 ft (116 m)

Population (2020)
  - Total: 92
  - Density: 119.5/sq mi (46.14/km^{2})
- Time zone: UTC-6 (Central (CST))
  - Summer (DST): UTC-5 (CDT)
- ZIP code: 63775
- Area code: 573
- FIPS code: 29-43346
- GNIS feature ID: 2398452

Lithium is a census-designated place and former village located in Perry County, Missouri, United States. The population was 92 at the 2020 census. The 2000 Census found Lithium to have zero residents; an Associated Press article, quoted a local resident who said that about 50 people lived there and speculated that they may have been counted as part of Perry County's rural population.

== Etymology ==
Lithium's location is due to two natural mineral springs; one of the two springs contained lithium salts, giving the town its name.

== History ==
Lithium was first surveyed as a town in 1882, and was incorporated in 1883. The location of the town was determined by two mineral springs, which were highly prized on account of their medicinal qualities, which led to the construction of a bath house by Thomas King in 1883. A Baptist church, Lithium Baptist, was organized in 1885 and a Catholic church, St. John the Evangelist, was organized in 1896. By 1912 the town had two general stores, two mills, a brick yard and population of 98.

== Geography ==
According to the United States Census Bureau, the village has a total area of 0.06 square miles (0.16 km^{2}), all land.

== Demographics ==
Historical population
Census	Pop.	Note	%±
1900	93		—
1910	98		5.4%
1920	94		−4.1%
1930	61		−35.1%
1940	91		49.2%
1950	57		−37.4%
1960	54		−5.3%
1970	56		3.7%
1980	81		44.6%
1990	9		−88.9%
2000	0		−100.0%
2010	89		—
2020	92		3.4%
U.S. Decennial Census 2020

As of the census of 2000, there were no people living in the village.

=== 2010 census ===
As of the census of 2010, there were 89 people, 28 households, and 22 families residing in the village. The population density was 1,483.3 inhabitants per square mile (572.7/km^{2}). There were 32 housing units at an average density of 533.3 per square mile (205.9/km^{2}). The racial makeup of the village was 98.88% White and 1.12% from other races. Hispanic or Latino of any race were 1.12% of the population.

There were 28 households, of which 53.6% had children under the age of 18 living with them, 64.3% were married couples living together, 7.1% had a female householder with no husband present, 7.1% had a male householder with no wife present, and 21.4% were non-families. 7.1% of all households were made up of individuals, and 3.6% had someone living alone who was 65 years of age or older. The average household size was 3.18 and the average family size was 3.27.

The median age in the village was 27.5 years. 34.8% of residents were under the age of 18; 9% were between the ages of 18 and 24; 25.7% were from 25 to 44; 20.2% were from 45 to 64; and 10.1% were 65 years of age or older. The gender makeup of the village was 57.3% male and 42.7% female.

== Gallery ==
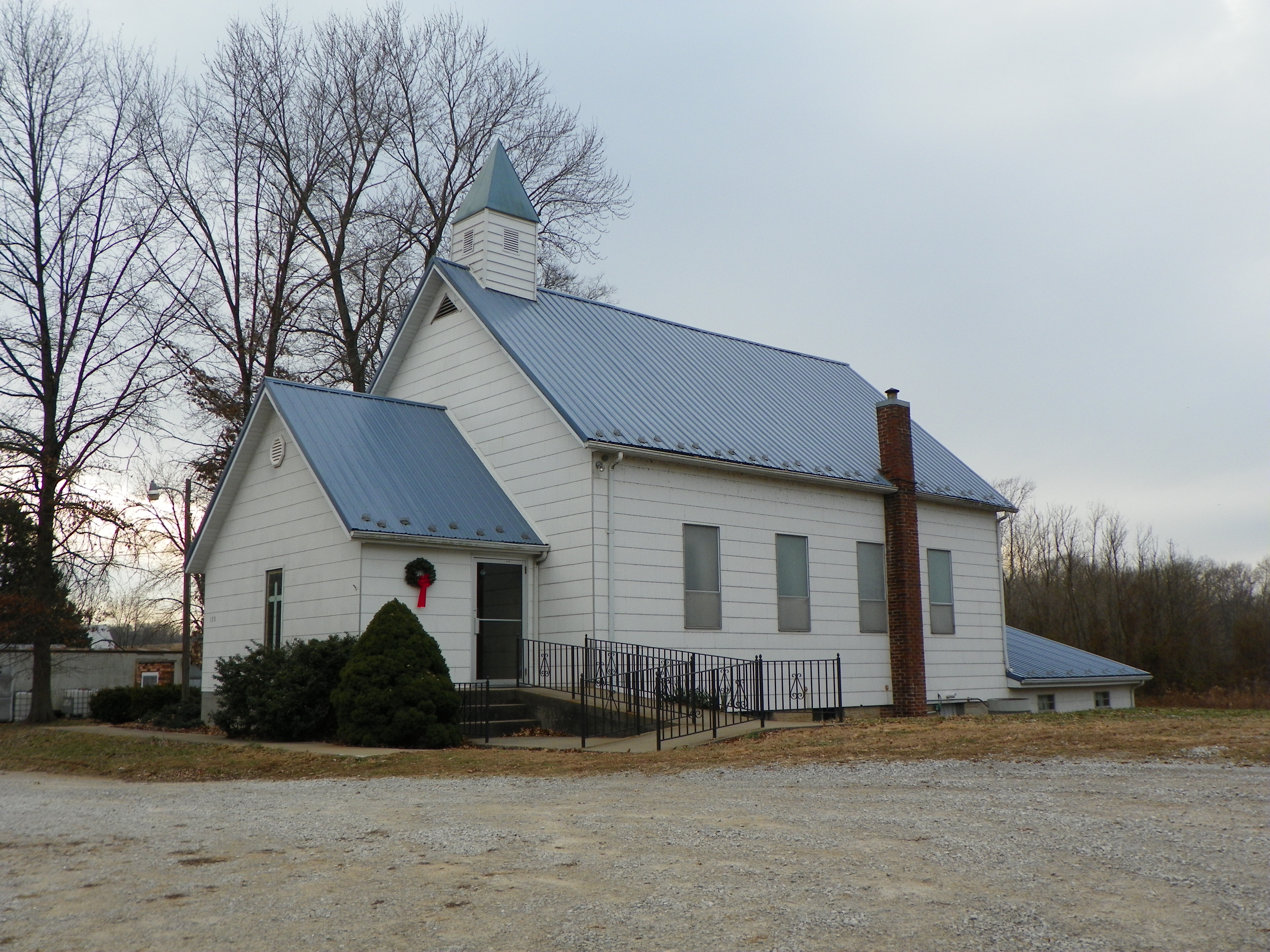
Lithium Baptist Church

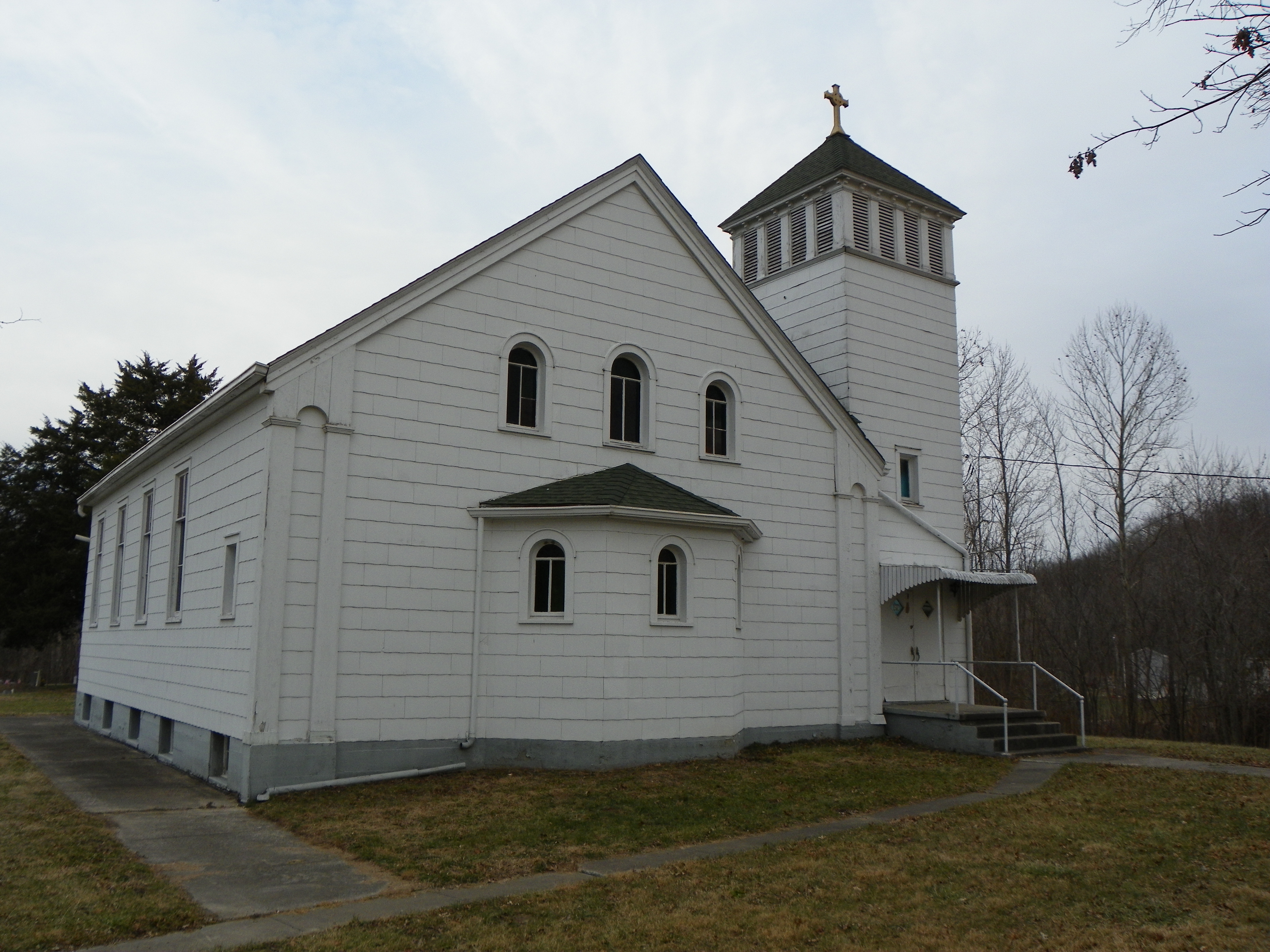
St. John the Evangelist Catholic Church
