= Belgique, Missouri =

Unincorporated community in Perry County, Missouri, United States

- Unincorporated community
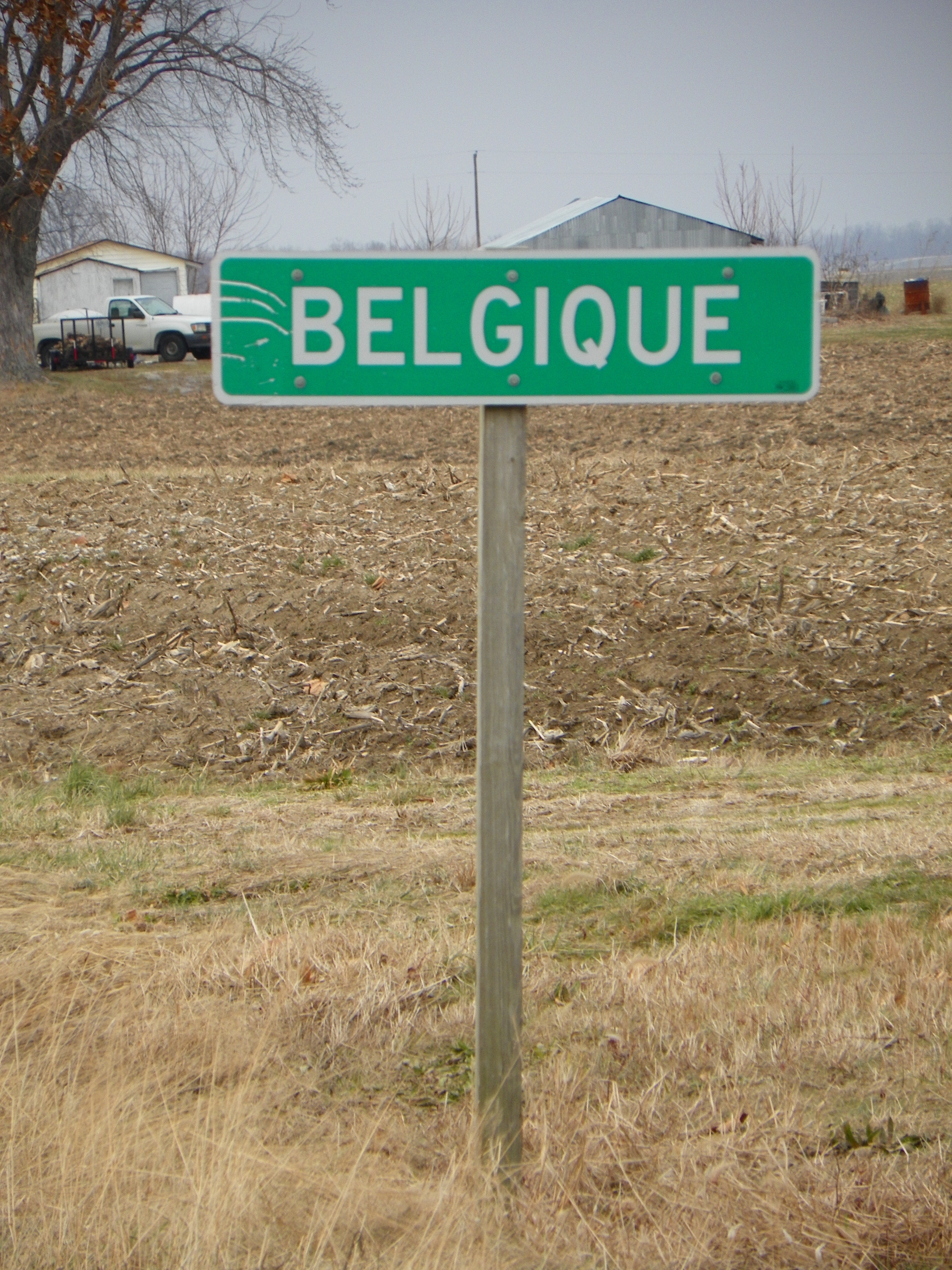
- Belgique, Missouri, roadsign

- Location of Perry County, Missouri
- Coordinates: 37°50′15″N 89°46′52″W
- Country: United States
- State: Missouri
- County: Perry
- Township: Bois Brule
- Named after: Belgium
- Elevation: 371 ft (113 m)
- Time zone: UTC-6 (Central (CST))
  - Summer (DST): UTC-5 (CDT)
- ZIP code: 63775
- Area code: 573
- FIPS code: 29-04042
- GNIS feature ID: 713893

Belgique is an unincorporated community in eastern Perry County, Missouri, United States. It is located approximately five miles south of Chester, Illinois in Perry County's Bois Brule Township.

== Etymology ==
Since a town already existed in Missouri which bore the name of Belgium, the Flemish residents opted to use the French name for their homeland.

== History ==
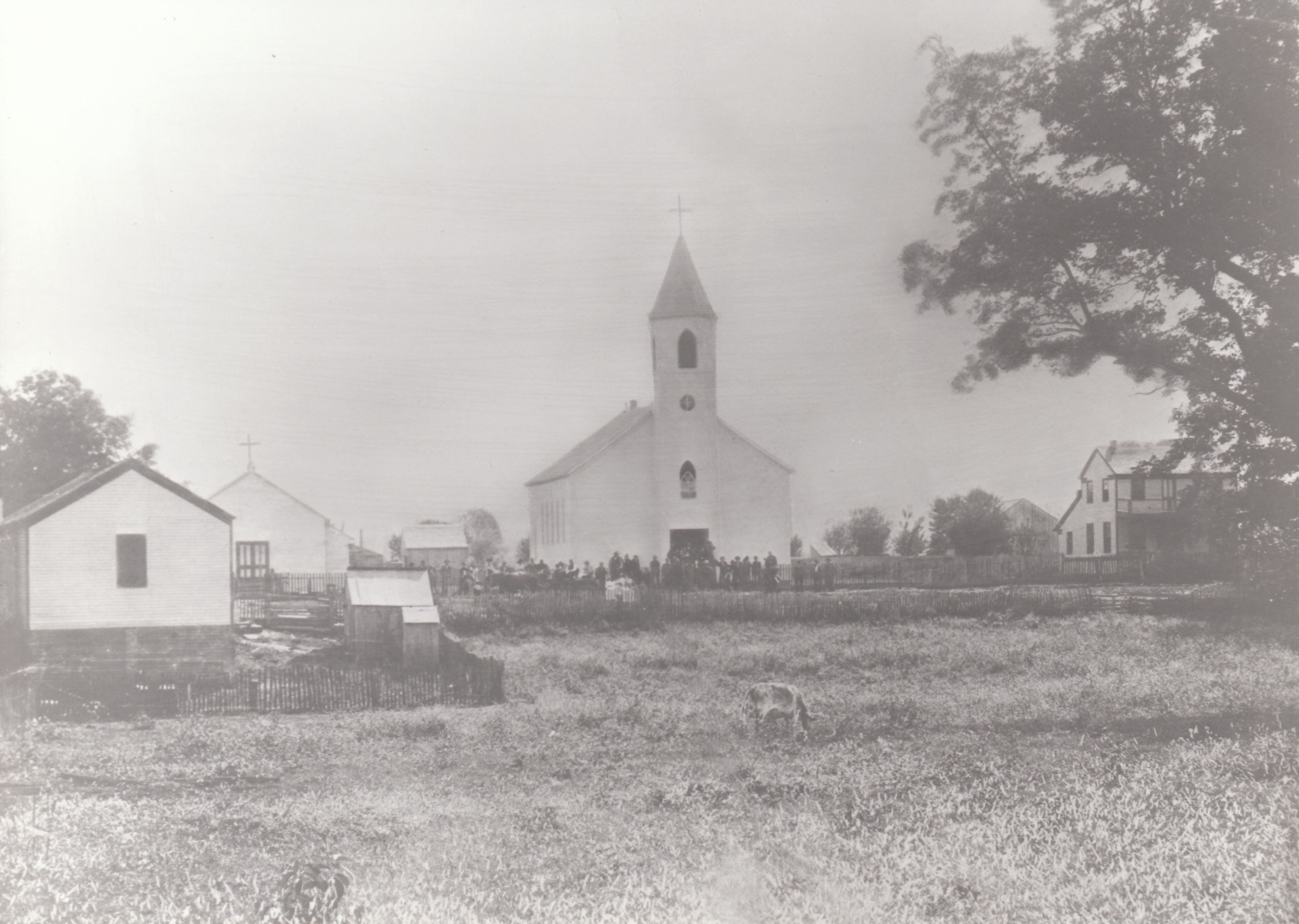
Belgique, 19th century

The town was originally settled by Catholic Flemings from Belgium. A Catholic church, The Nativity of the Blessed Virgin Mary, existed in Belgique from 1884 to 1992. A post office was established in 1890, but as the name "Belgium" had already been taken, the French name for Belgium "Belgique" was used instead. Its post office has closed and its mail now comes from Perryville. Since the flood of 1993 there is no longer an existing town.

== Geography ==
Belgique was located on the flat alluvial plain of the Bois Brule Bottom situated in the northern part of Perry County.

=== Floods ===
Of the many floods over the centuries, the most devastating flood was the Great Flood of 1993. The subsequent flood destroyed the village, leaving only a handful of residents to return to the area following the flood.

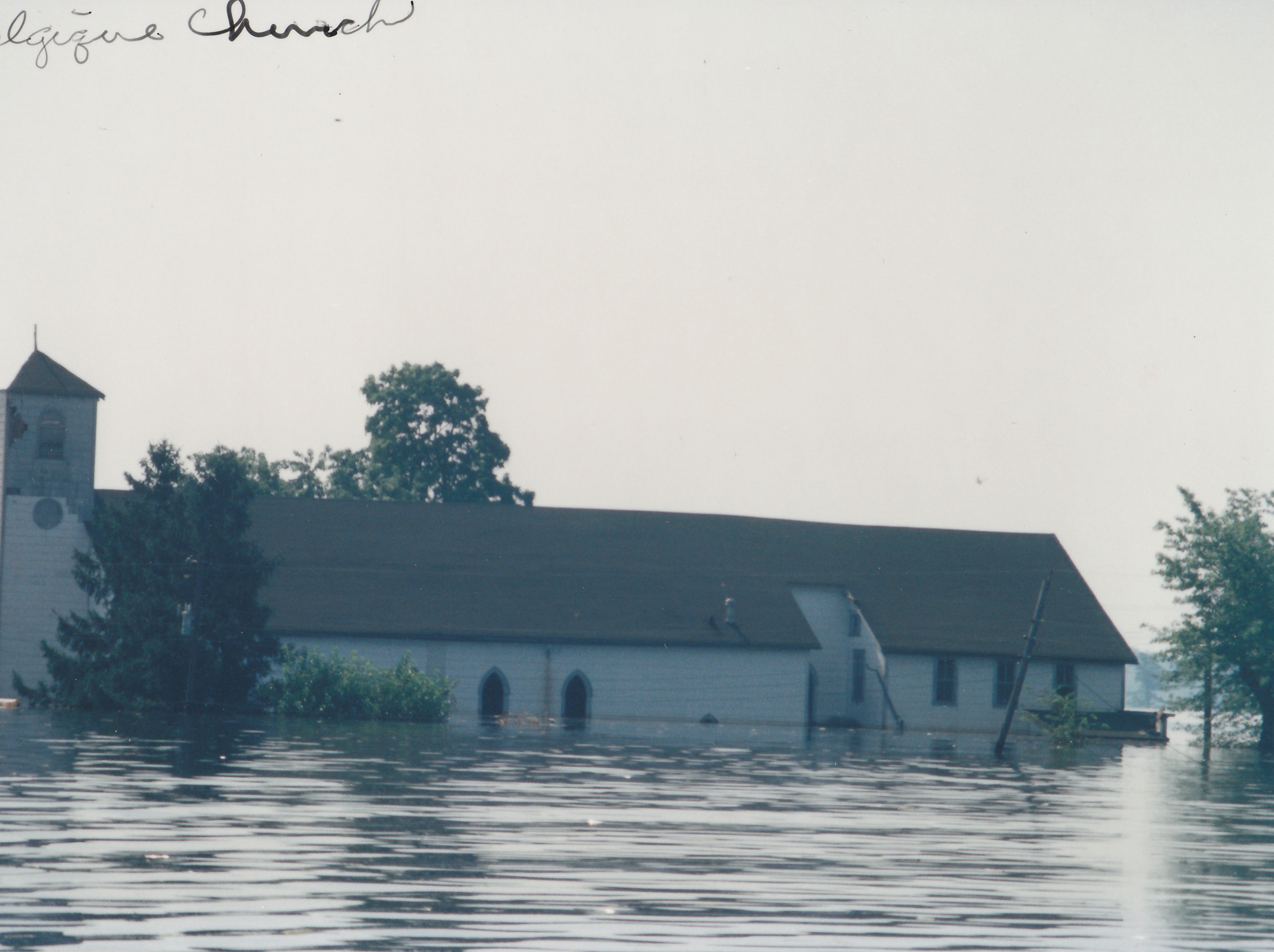
Flooded Church - Nativity of the Blessed Virgin Mary

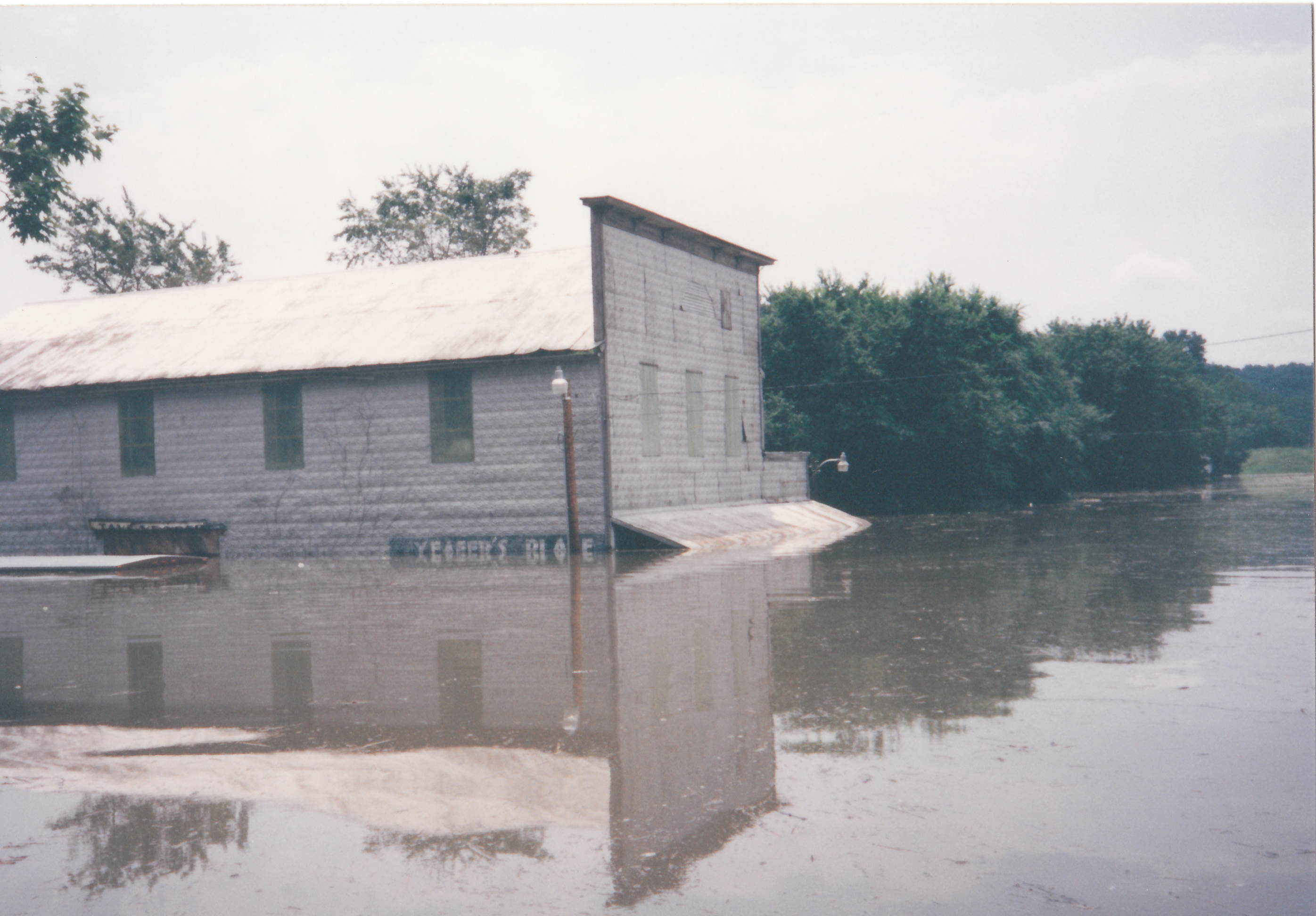
Flooded store

== Demographics ==
Historical population
| Census | Pop. | Note | %± |
|---|---|---|---|
| 1920 | 61 | | — |
| 1930 | 69 | | 13.1% |
| 1940 | 78 | | 13.0% |
| 1950 | 66 | | −15.4% |
| 1960 | 61 | | −7.6% |
| 1970 | 18 | | −70.5% |
Missouri Census Data Center

The municipality of Belgique was incorporated over a span of seven decades, and its most recent census was in 1970.
