= Lithium Baptist Church (Lithium, Missouri) =

Lithium Baptist Church, Lithium, Missouri
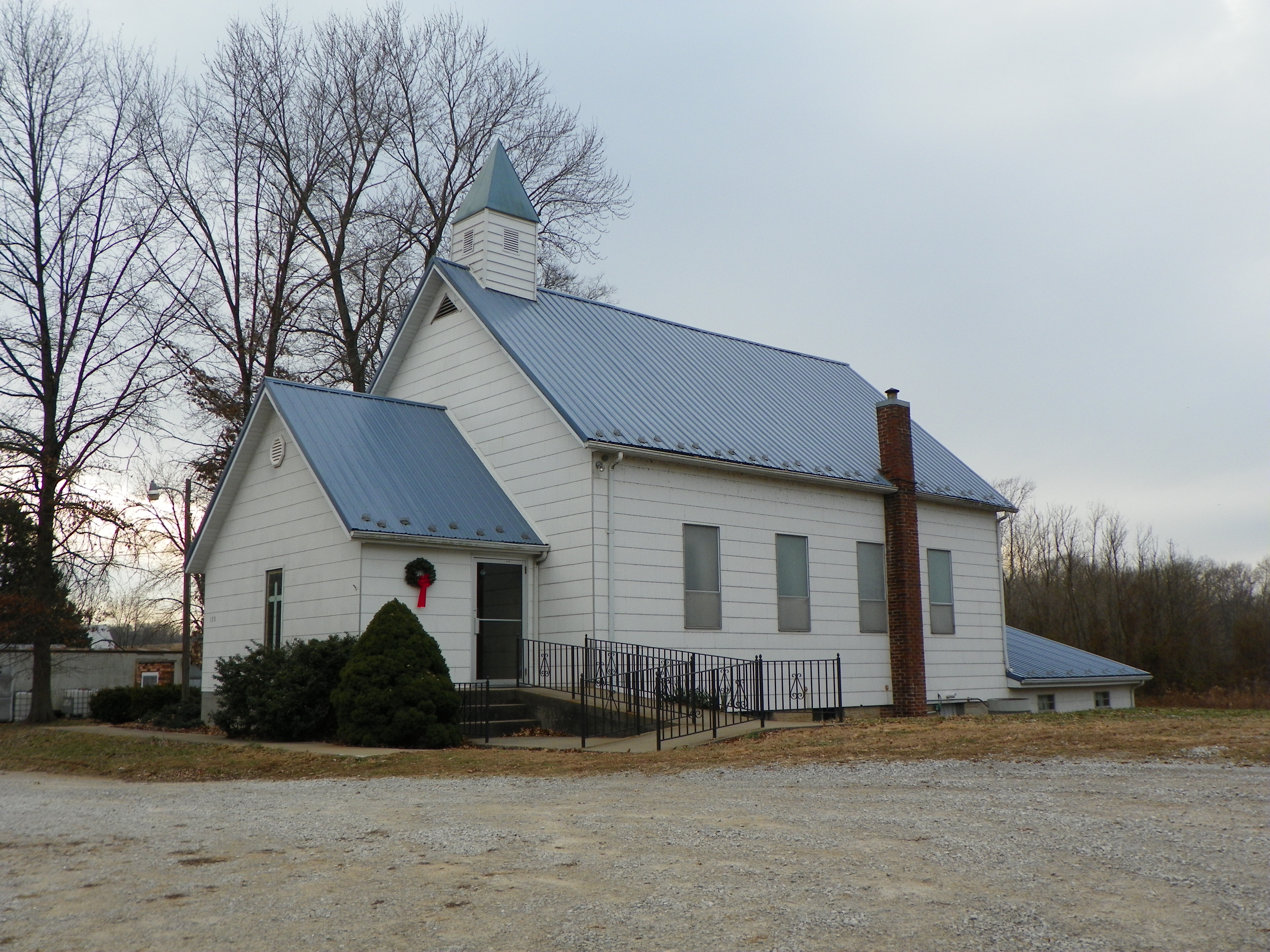

- Location within Missouri
- 37°44′47″N 89°43′40″W
- Location: 130 Blue Springs Ln, Lithium, Missouri
- Country: United States
- Denomination: Baptist

Clergy
- Pastor: Re. Craig Pedzoldt

Lithium Baptist Church is a Baptist church in Lithium, Missouri.

== History ==
Lithium Baptist church was organized in 1885. Lithium Baptist church is a member of the Cape Girardeau Baptist Association.
