= Bois Brule Township, Perry County, Missouri =

Township in the US state of Missouri

Bois Brule, Missouri
- Civil Township
- Location of Perry County
- Coordinates: 37°49′18″N 89°47′32″W
- Country: United States
- State: Missouri
- County: Perry
- Established: Places of the USA: Bois Brûlé Township

Area
  - Total: 64 sq mi (165 km^{2})
  - Land: 61 sq mi (157 km^{2})
  - Water: 3.1 sq mi (8 km^{2})
- GNIS Feature ID: 767151

Bois Brûlé is one of the eight townships located in Perry County, Missouri, in the United States of America.

== Etymology ==
Bois Brûlé comes from the French word Bois-Brûlés (Burnt Woods) which was named for the Mississippi River bottom land by the same name. The name for the area was given by French colonial habitants, and was frequently applied by the French to a burnt tract of forest.

== History ==
The early Native American inhabitants of the area were the Mississippian Mound Builders. The Mississippian Mound Builders were part of the Mississippian culture which went into decline in the 12th and 13th centuries.

In the 1770s, members of the Kaskaskia Tribe living in the Illinois Country began migrating into area. In the 1780s, the Shawnee and Delaware tribes, living in Ohio and Indiana but originating in Delaware and Pennsylvania, had been once again displaced and had immigrated with Colonial Spanish consent to the present-area of the Bois Brûlé bottoms. The Spanish authorities invited them to settle and act as a buffer to the native Osage Indians to the south.

The first European settler in the Bois Brûlé Bottoms was Jean Baptiste Barsaloux, a traveling merchant. In response to the presence of the Shawnee and Delaware, he moved to the area in 1787, and applied for a concession of land for himself and his father, Girard Barsaloux.

By 1779 immigration into the Spanish Colony was still restricted only to Catholics. At this time seven men of the “English Nation” as the Americans were known, petitioned Francois Valle and received permission from Lieutenant Governor Leyba to settle tin the Bois Brûlé bottom, as safety against incursions of Indians and to prevent the wandering away of cattle.

In 1798, a number of Irish Catholics were given permission to settle in the Bois Brûlé area.

The Bois Brûlé Township was organized in 1821 and was one of Perry County's original 3 townships.

The Bois Brûlé Post Office (1886-1902) was located at a landing on the Mississippi River sometimes called Anchor Landing.

== Geography ==
The Bois Brule Bottomlands cover an area eighteen miles long and 3 to 6 miles wide along the Mississippi River. To the north lie the Grand Champ bottomlands while hills and river bluffs lie to the south. There are 6 unincorporated communities in Bois Brûlé Township: Allans Landing, Belgique, Bishop's Landing, Claryville, McBride, Menfro and Sereno.

== Demographics ==
=== 2000 Census ===
As of the census of 2000, there were 501 people living in the township. The racial makeup of the town was 98.30% White, 0.3% American Indian and Alaska Native, and 0.80% from other races.

=== 2010 Census ===
As of the census of 2010, there were 540 people living in the township. The racial makeup of the town was 97.9% White, 0.19% American Indian and Alaska Native, and 1.30% from other races.
