= St. John the Evangelist Roman Catholic Church (Lithium, Missouri) =

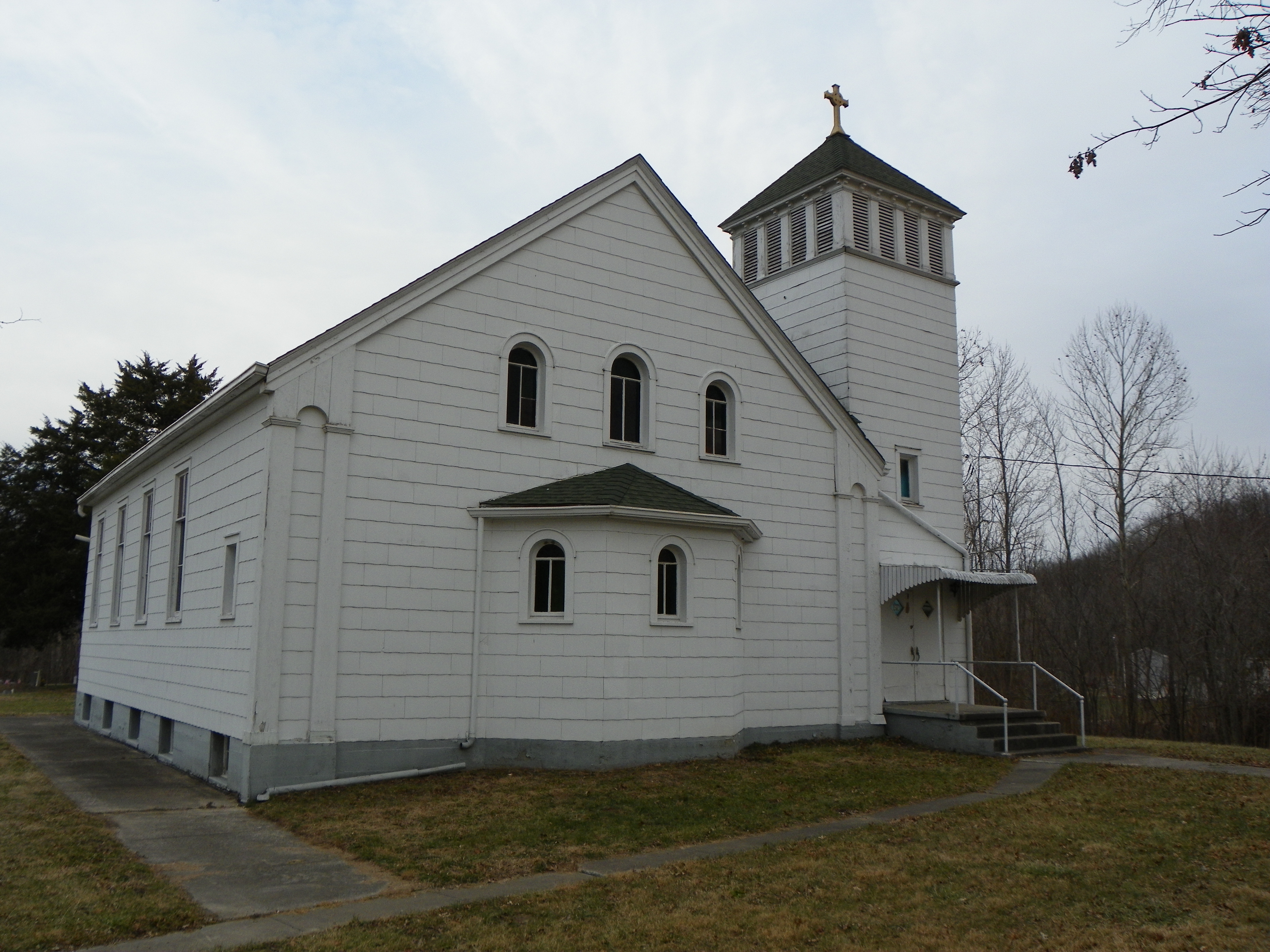

- Location within Missouri
- 37°49′56″N 89°53′02″W
- Location: Blue Spring Lane; Lithium, Missouri
- Country: United States
- Denomination: Roman Catholic Church

History
- Founded: 1904
- Consecrated: 1906

Architecture
- Groundbreaking: 1904
- Completed: 1906

Administration
- Archdiocese: Archdiocese of St. Louis

Clergy
- Archbishop: Most Rev. Robert Carlson

St. John the Evangelist Church is a disused Catholic church in Lithium, Missouri.

== History ==
The parish was originally established in 1904 as St. Theresa's. The first church and rectory were completed in 1906, and by the following year, it was serving as mission parish of Claryville, Missouri. In 1938, in deference to a donor who provided most of the money for the new church building, the parish was to be renamed St. John the Baptist. After the dedication of the new church that same year, a statue of the patron saint was commissioned by John Glennon, Archbishop of St. Louis. When it arrived and was uncrated, however, it recognized as St. John the Evangelist, and so it remained.

It was a mission parish of Claryville, then of Sereno, and by 1982, of Perryville. The church was closed in 1985 and its faith community invited to be part of Our Lady of Victory in Sereno.
