= Menfro, Missouri =

- unincorporated community
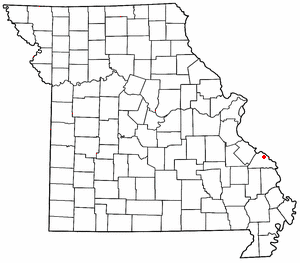
- Location of Menfro, Missouri
- Coordinates: 37°46′37″N 89°43′24″W
- Country: United States
- State: Missouri
- County: Perry
- Township: Bois Brule
- Elevation: 358 ft (109 m)
- Time zone: UTC-6 (Central (CST))
  - Summer (DST): UTC-5 (CDT)
- ZIP code: 63775
- Area code: 573
- FIPS code: 29-47324
- GNIS feature ID: 722232

Menfro is an unincorporated community in northeastern Perry County, Missouri, United States. It is located 8 miles (13 km) northeast of Perryville.

== Name ==
The town is said to have been named by St. Louis-San Francisco Railroad officials in 1904 "for the three men who were killed on the river, who were bringing in supplies for the railroad."

== History ==
Menfro was established on a small portion of Levi Wiggin's land grant #1328. In January 1877, this small plot of land was subdivided by the Perry County Surveyor and eventually became known as the Town of Menfro.

In September 1879, Valentine and Margaret Hoehn sold a portion of land grant #1328 to Frederick Moldenhauer. The Moldenhauer family still owns this tract of land which is home to the Moldenhauer Alfalfa Mill.

Menfro began as a stop on the St. Louis, Memphis & South Eastern Railroad, which began construction on 22 September 1902, with the intention of linking Perry County with St. Louis in time for the 1904 World's Fair. A post office was opened in 1904 (closed in 1996).

== Floods ==
The Town of Menfro is located on Cinque Hommes Creek, which is usually called "Menfro Creek" by the local population. Menfro Creek empties into the Mississippi River just a mile (1.6k) downstream from the Town of Menfro. When the water level in the Mississippi River rises, the Menfro Creek runs backwards, taking in the rising water from the Mississippi. As such, when the Mississippi River floods, so does Menfro.

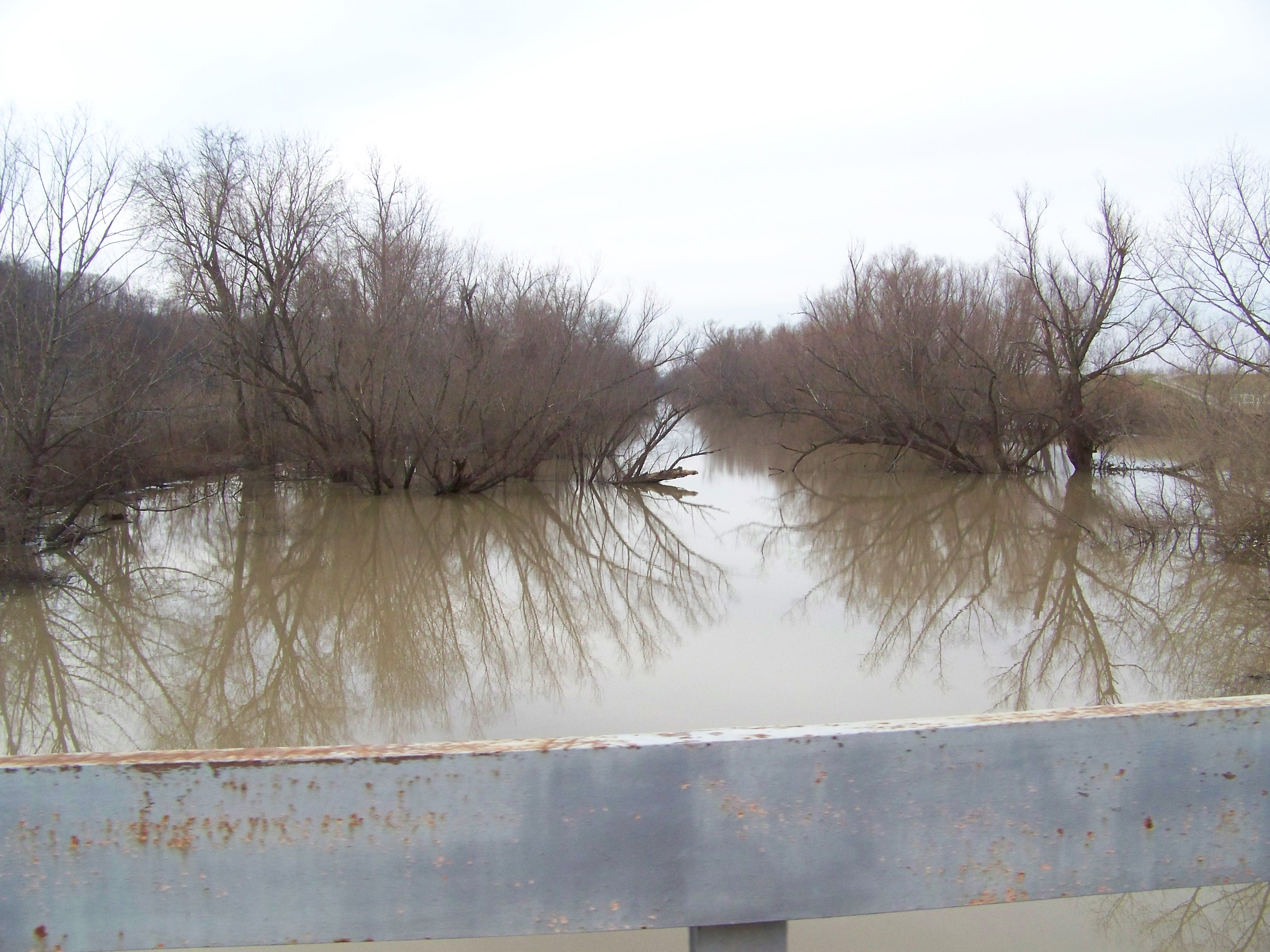
Flooded Cinque Hommes Creek at Menfro, Missouri.

Three major floods have affected Menfro (1943, 1973 and 1993). Each time, the Town of Menfro was destroyed. After the 1943 and 1973 floods the town was rebuilt; however, after the 1993 flood the town did not recover.

== Geography ==
Menfro is situated in the Mississippi River Valley within an alluvial flood plain called the Bois Brule Bottom. Being nestled between the limestone bluffs along the western edge of Bois Brule Bottom and Cinque Hommes Creek directly to the east has made Menfro susceptible to flooding.

== Demographics ==
Historical population
Census	Pop.	Note	%±
1920	107		—
1930	79		−26.2%
1940	93		17.7%
1950	80		−14.0%
1960	61		−23.7%
1970	37		−39.3%
Missouri Census Data Center
