= Claryville, Missouri =

- Unincorporated Community
- Location of Perry County, Missouri
- Coordinates: 37°53′32″N 89°49′44″W
- Country: United States
- State: Missouri
- County: Perry
- Township: Bois Brule
- Elevation: 374 ft (114 m)
- Time zone: UTC-6 (Central (CST))
  - Summer (DST): UTC-5 (CDT)
- ZIP code: 63775
- Area code: 573
- FIPS code: 29-14230
- GNIS feature ID: 735559

Claryville is an unincorporated community in Bois Brule Township in Perry County, Missouri, United States. It is located twelve miles northeast of Perryville, sixty-three miles south of Saint Louis, and lies adjacent to the Mississippi River.

== Etymology ==
The spelling of the name was first Clearyville, as it was named for John Cleary, a nearby farmer. The name was eventually changed to correspond to the pronunciation. Claryville was also known unofficially as West Chester.

John W. Clary received the land for his service to the United States of America in the Mexican–American War, under the authority of the ScripWarrant Act of 1847 (9 Stat. 123) He was awarded the maximum amount of land, which was 160 acres, in his grant.

== History ==
Claryville was first settled in 1869, and the town was platted in 1871. The first mayor was V.P. Tucker and its first merchant was E. J. Rhodes. As of 1912, the town had three general stores and a population of 140. Subsequent floods over the years have diminished the town's population.

== Geography ==
Claryville is situated in the Mississippi River Valley within an alluvial flood plain called the Bois Brule Bottom. Its location along the Mississippi River has made Claryville susceptible to flooding.

== Demographics ==
Historical population
Census	Pop.	Note	%±
1900	122		—
1910	140		14.8%
1920	99		−29.3%
1930	107		8.1%
1940	101		−5.6%
1950	16		−84.2%
1960	30		87.5%
Missouri Census Data Center
