= Le Grand Champ Bottom =

Floodplain in Missouri, U.S.

- Flood plain
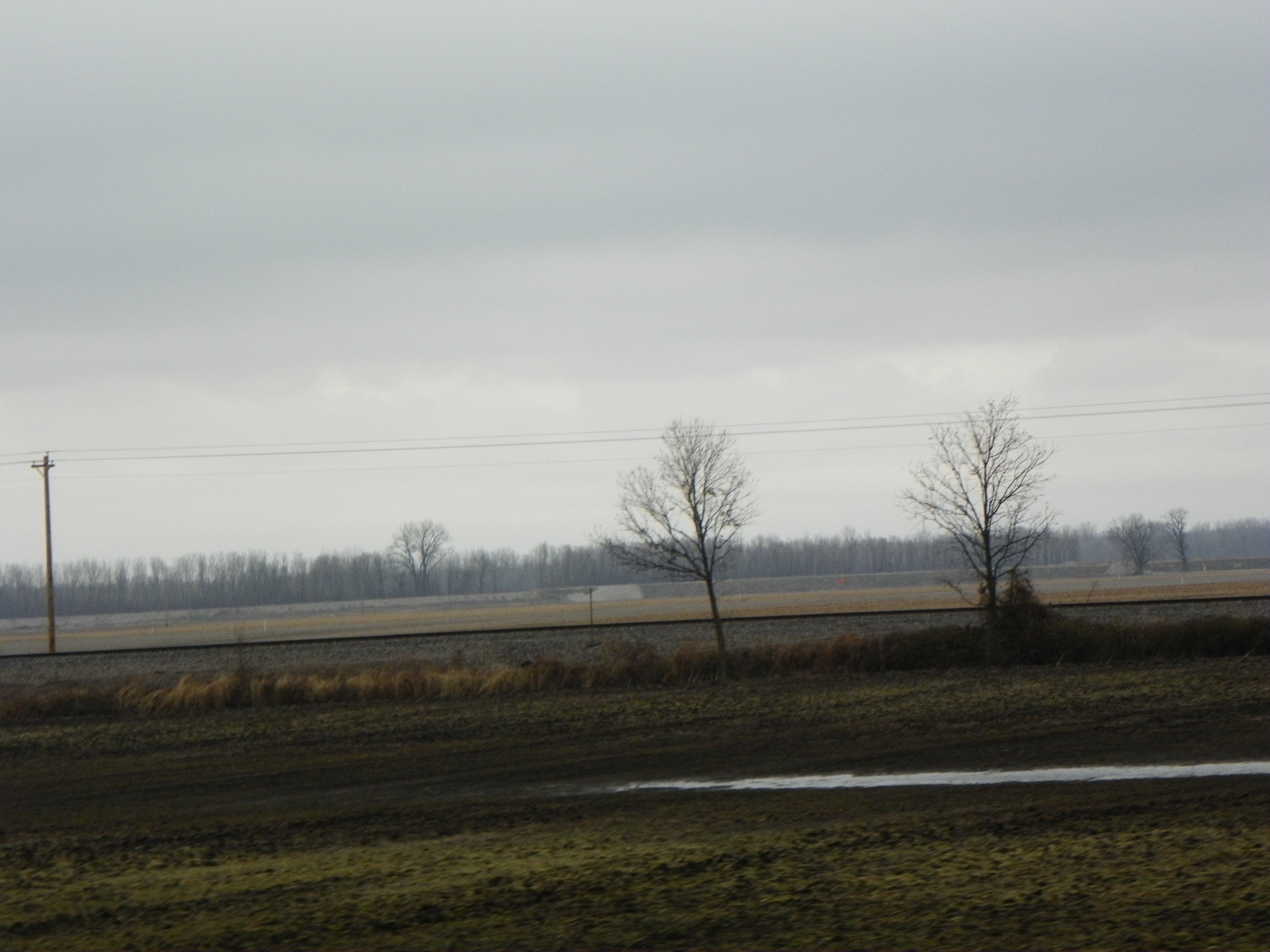
- Le Grand Champ Bottoms

- Coordinates: 37.948°N 89.997°W
- Location: Ste. Genevieve County, Missouri, United States

Le Grand Champ (French for "the big field") is an alluvial floodplain, also called a bottom, extending along the Mississippi River in Ste. Genevieve County, Missouri.

The American Bottom stretches from St. Louis south along the east side of the Mississippi River all the way to the mouth of the Kaskaskia River, just north of Fort Kaskaskia, Illinois. At Morrow Island the American Bottom is broken by the Mississippi River, and on the west side of the Mississippi River the alluvial plain continues as the "Le Grand Champ" or Big Field Bottom, which includes Kaskaskia Island.

== Name ==
Le Grand Champ was so named because it served as the main common agricultural land for Old Ste. Genevieve (Le Vieux Village de Ste. Genevieve). This name was the usual name for the common field of a French village. The field was also known as the "grand carre" or "quarre" to the French. Later, the Americans referred to the field as "The Big Field".

== History ==
=== Indigenous peoples ===
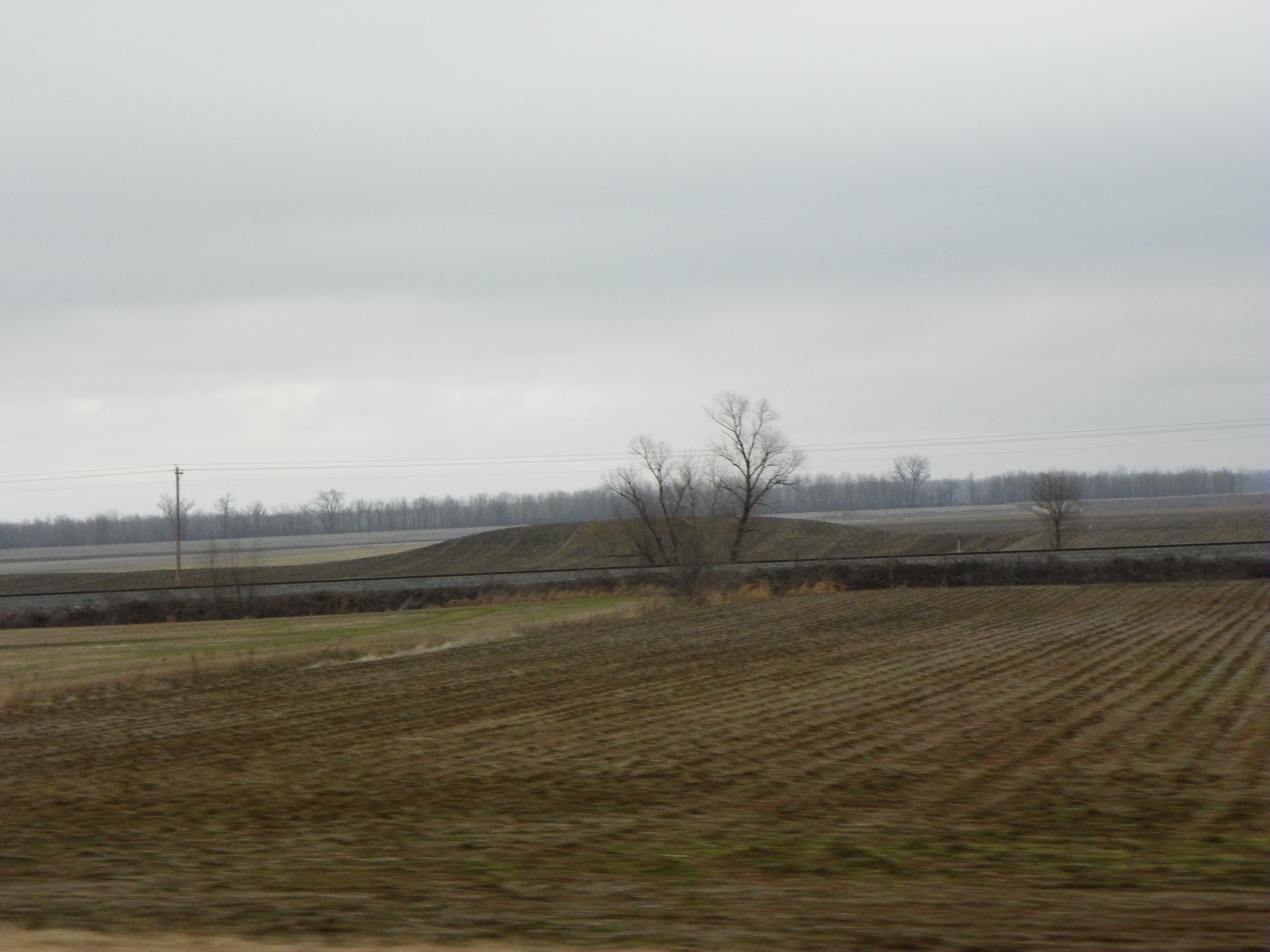
Old Native American mound

The Mound Builders are the earliest Native American groups known to have inhabited the area. The Mound Builders cultivated corn and constructed large earthen mounds, particularly in the flood plains along the Mississippi River. The Mississippian culture was in decline by the 12th and 13th centuries, and had largely disappeared by the time of European contact. At the time of European contact the most prominent Native American nation in the area were the Illiniwek who inhabited much of present-day Illinois and eastern Missouri. One particular Illiniwek tribe, the Kaskaskia Indians, originated from the area of present-day Peoria, Illinois, but had migrated south to the area of Kaskaskia, Illinois. In the late 1770s and 1780s, remnants of another Illiniwek tribe, the Peoria tribe, left the east bank of the Mississippi River to escape British and American oppression, with most settling in New Ste. Genevieve and around the Grand Champ Bottom. They were later followed by another Algonquian speaking tribe, the Kickapoos.

=== French settlement ===
Le Grand Champ served as the common field of Ste. Genevieve. It lies south of the community and extends to the River aux Vases in the bottoms along the Mississippi River. The original French name was "Le Grand Champ."

In Colonial French Ste. Genevieve each inhabitant was granted, in addition to his house lot, one or more lots in the common-fields that were set aside for cultivation. These lots were laid out in strips, generally one arpent wide (192 feet, 6 inches) and forty arpent long (roughly a mile), with long narrow plots perpendicular to the Mississippi River, and extended back to the foot of the bluffs. This manner of land distribution was common in medieval Europe, and became the private possession of the individual holder. The common-field was separated from the commons by a fence, which served to keep cattle and livestock from wandering into the fields. Each person owning a strip of land was required to maintain the section of the fence that crossed his land. As late as 1907 the "big field" of Ste. Genevieve was still being cultivated in this manner. The common field is not to be confused with the commons (French: la commune), which was an area set apart and used in common by all inhabitants of the village for the gathering of firewood and the pasturage of livestock. Le Grand Champ not only fed Ste. Genevieve, but also provided a large part of the food for New Orleans, quickly becoming the breadbasket of Louisiana. A number of crops were cultivated in the field: corn, pumpkins, wheat, oats, barley, flax, cotton, and tobacco. Lacking steel implements, most of the farmers let their crops simply compete with weeds until harvest time. A village of Peorias and Kickapoos lay on Le Grand Champ near old Ste. Genevieve, and their children played with French children.

However, relations with the Osage Indians to the southwest were not so peaceful. The Osage had no settlement near Ste. Genevieve, but they ranged widely to hunt wild game, as well as to steal livestock from the French. At night the Osage warriors would enter Ste. Genevieve, broke into stables, stole livestock and took anything else they found of value. The Periorias and Kickapoos would go on hunts in the fall, spring and summer to supplement their crops, but they had to suspend their hunts for fear of the Osage. The French welcomed Shawnee and Delaware tribes from Ohio and Indiana to settle south of Le Grand Champ in present-day Perry County to serve as a buffer against the Osage. There, the Shawnee and Delaware established 6 settlements. However, the Shawnee and Delaware could do little to stop Osage raids. It was said that the Osage did not meet their match until American immigrants arrived, who regarded shooting Indians as being somewhat akin to squirrel hunting.

== Floods ==
Flooding has been a constant concern of the residents of Le Grand Champ Bottom ever since settlement began. Under French and Spanish colonial administration, each colonial was required to build and maintain levees on his land. In 1785 a large flood inundated the floodplain, causing the residents to move the town of Ste. Genevieve to a new location that was less susceptible to flooding. In modern times a number of floods have struck the floodplain, particularly in 1943, 1973, 1993, and the winter of 2015–16.

== Geography ==
Le Grand Champ lies about three miles south of the present-day site of (New) Ste. Genevieve, in an area of the alluvial floodplain historically known as "Pointe Basse". In 1811 the bottomland around Le Grand Champ was estimated to be the size of 10,000 acres. However, the size of the cultivated field is estimated to have consisted of roughly three thousand acres of tillable land. To the northeast of Le Grand Champ lies the American Bottom and to the south lies Kaskaskia Island and Bois Brule Bottom.

== Communities in the Le Grand Champ Bottoms ==
- New Bourbon
- Old Ste. Genevieve

== See also ==
- American Bottom
- Bois Brule Bottom
- Brazeau Bottom
