= Bois Brule Creek (Osage River tributary) =

Stream in the American state of Missouri

Bois Brule Creek is a stream in Cole and Miller counties of Missouri. It is a tributary of the Osage River.

The stream headwaters are in northeast Miller County at 38°22′11″N 92°24′23″W and the confluence with the Osage in southwest Cole County is at 38°22′14″N 92°15′42″W. The source area for the stream lies just south of U.S. Route 54 north of Eugene. The stream flow eastward crossing under Missouri Route 17 and on east meandering northeast and passing under Missouri Route H before entering the Osage west of St. Thomas.

Bois Brule is a name derived from French meaning "burnt woods".

== See also ==
- List of rivers of Missouri
