= Cinque Hommes Creek =

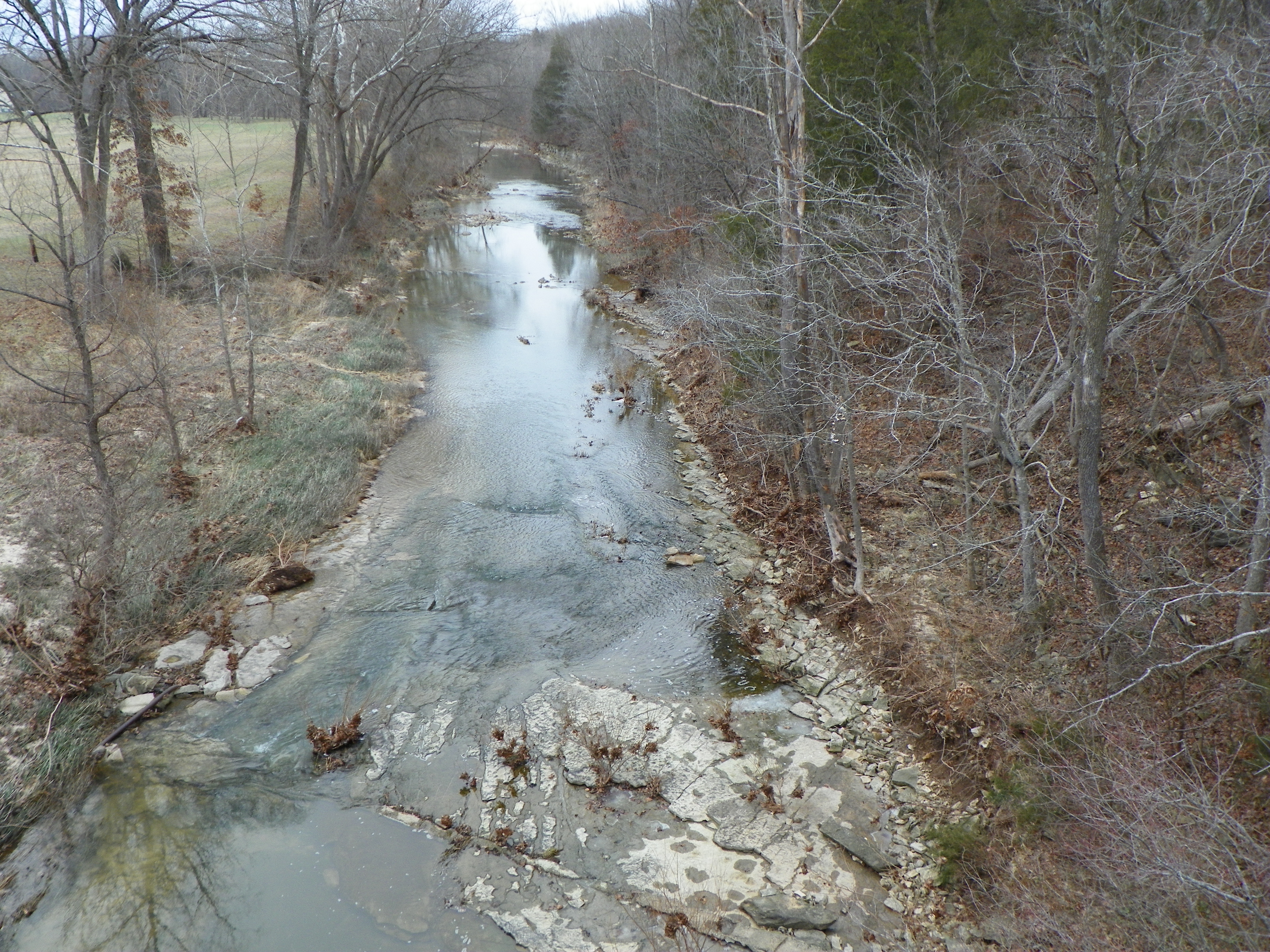
- Etymology: French meaning "Five Men", or St. Cosme, a Catholic Missionary

Location
- Country: United States
- State: Missouri

Physical characteristics
- Source
  - location: Perry County, MO
  - coordinates: 37°41′32″N 89°53′00″W
  - elevation: Approximately 518 ft (158 m)
- Mouth: Mississippi River
  - location: Cape Cinque Hommes, MO
  - coordinates: 37°45′12″N 89°40′12″W
  - elevation: 348 ft (106 m)
- Length: 17.1 mi (27.5 km)
- Basin size: 70.1 mi^{2} (182 km^{2})

Cinque Hommes Creek is a tributary of the Mississippi River flowing through Perry County, Missouri.

== Name ==
The early Colonial French name for the creek was "à la viande" or "with meat". Cinque Hommes Creek was named after Cape Cinque Hommes on the Mississippi River, although this name most likely originates from the Canadian Catholic missionary priest Father Jean Francois Buisson de St. Cosme. The pronunciation of "St. Cosme" and "Cinque Hommes" is exactly the same in French, and the early Frenchmen who came after father St. Cosme, misunderstanding, called it by the latter name.

== Physical geography ==
The stream rises in Cinque Hommes Township in Perry County, Missouri, and takes a winding course through Central and Salem townships. Its mouth empties into the Mississippi River near Menfro not far from Cape Cinque Hommes. Five cave systems are found within the Cinque Hommes Creek drainage: Moore Cave, Crevice Cave, Mystery Cave, Rimstone River Cave and Running Bull Cave.

A number of tributaries flow into Cinque Hommes Creek:

- Ball mill Spring
- Blue Spring
- Bois Brule Creek
- Doc White Spring
- Hog Pen Spring
- Keyhole Spring
- Sandy Branch
- Schawanes Springs Branch
- Spring Branch
- Sutterer Spring
- Tyler Branch
- Quarry Spring

== Cultural geography ==
A number of bridges have crossed Cinque Hommes Creek over the years. The Cinque Hommes Creek Route B Bridge was a truss bridge built in 1888, and collapsed on April 15, 1962, following a collusion by an overweight truck. It was replaced in 1963. The Cinque Hommes US 61 Bridge was a truss bridge built in 1930, and replaced in 1996 with a stringer bridge. Cinque Hommes Creek empties into the Mississippi River south of Menfro, Missouri in the Red Rock Landing Conversation Area.

== History ==
Cape St. Cosme or Cape Cinque Hommes - a point on the Mississippi River - was conferred for Father Jean Francois Buisson de Saint Cosme (1667-1702), a missionary priest from the Quebec Seminary of Foreign Missions, who visited the spot in 1698 and erected a cross on Grand Tower. Jean St. Cosme was the son of Michael Buisson, a native of Cosme le Vert in the Diocese of Mans in France, and of Susanne Licheraffe. He was ordained a Seminarian priest at the age of twenty-three. Father St. Cosme was stationed first at Tamaroa, in Illinois, and also labored in Acadia, Louisiana, and among the Natchez Indians in Lower Louisiana. He was massacred by a party of the Chitimacha Indians while descending the Mississippi in 1702.

== Gallery ==
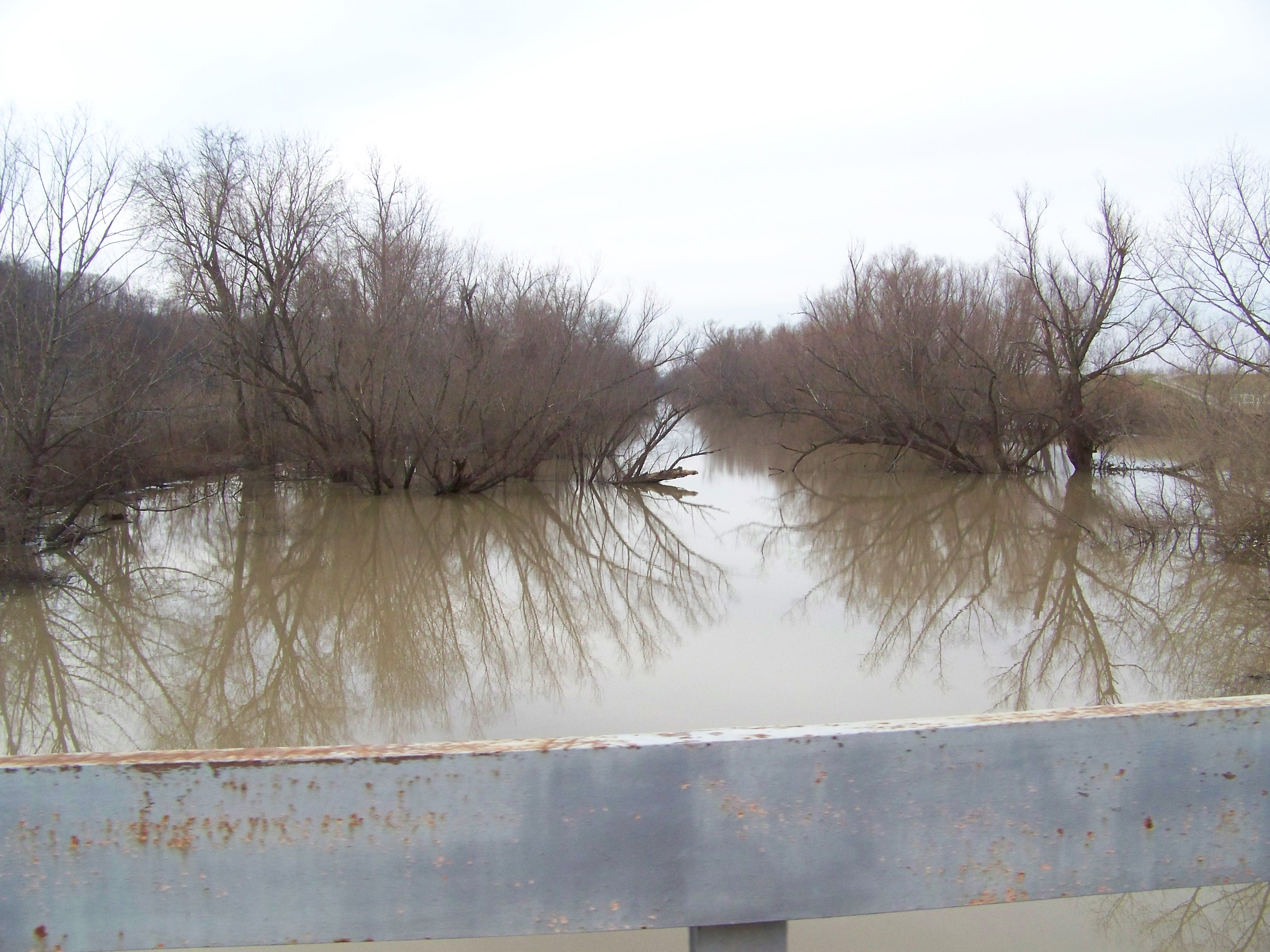
Flooded Cinque Hommes Creek at Menfro, Missouri

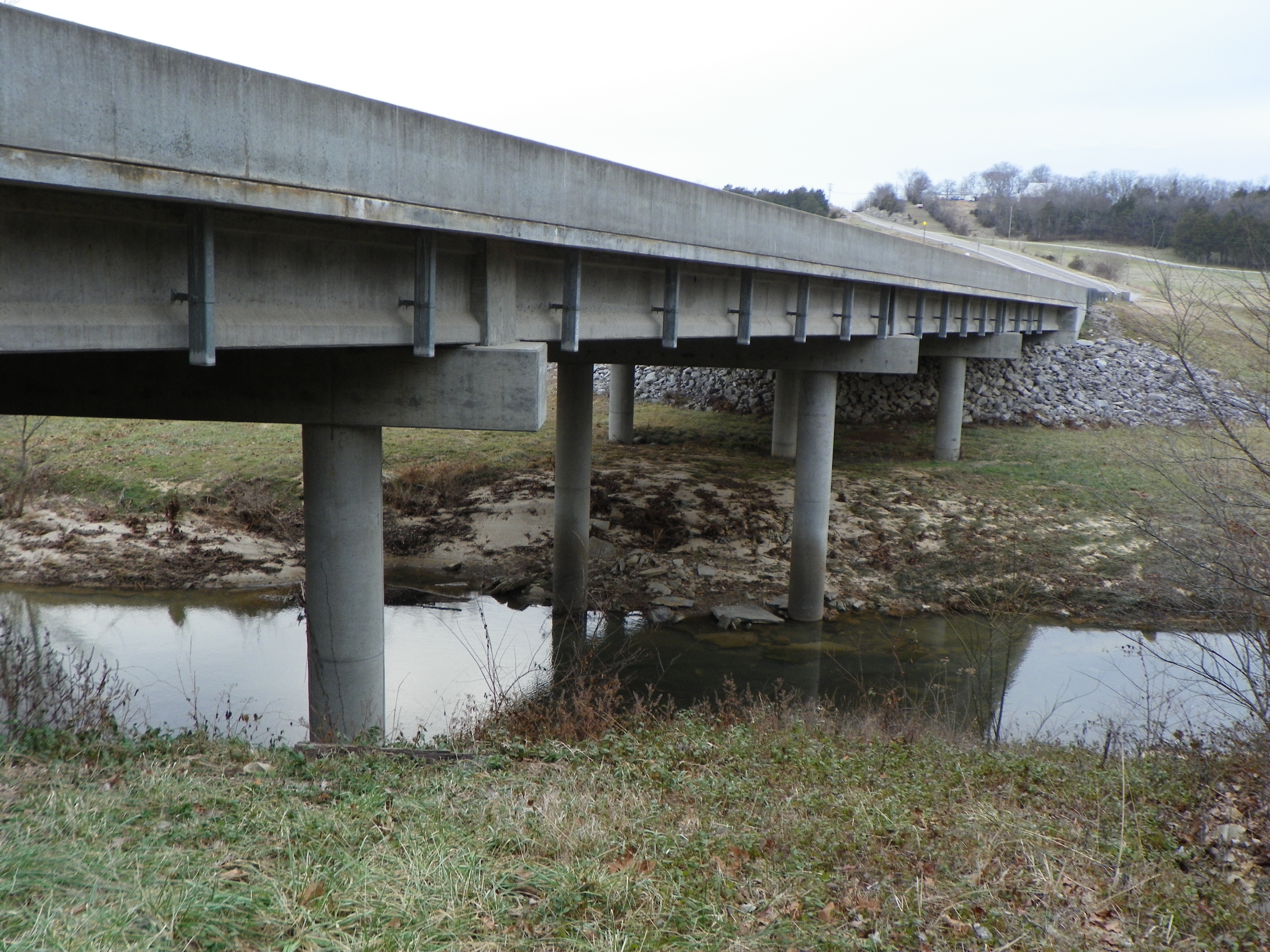
Highway 61 Bridge south of Perryville, MO

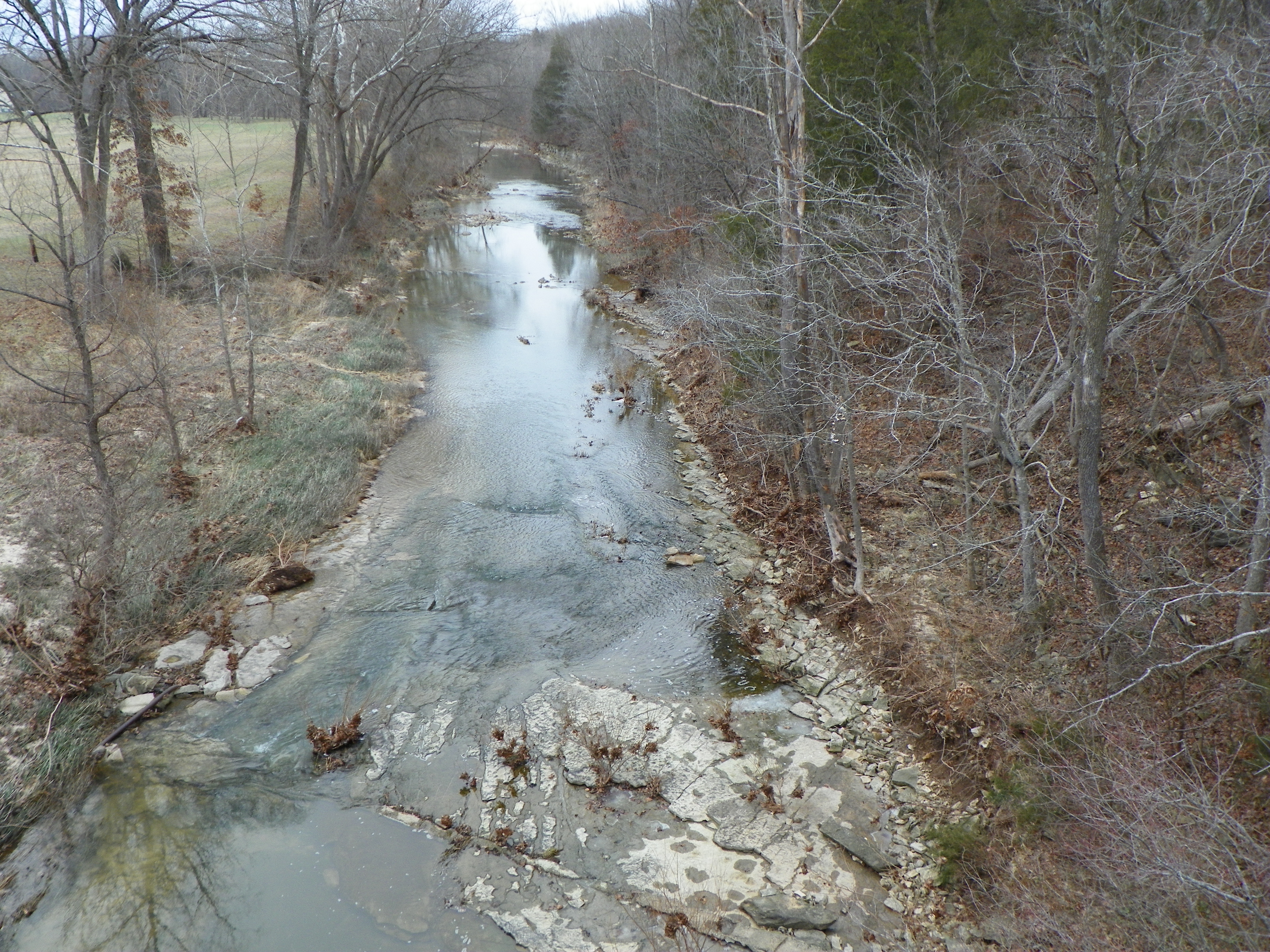
View north of Hwy 61 bridge

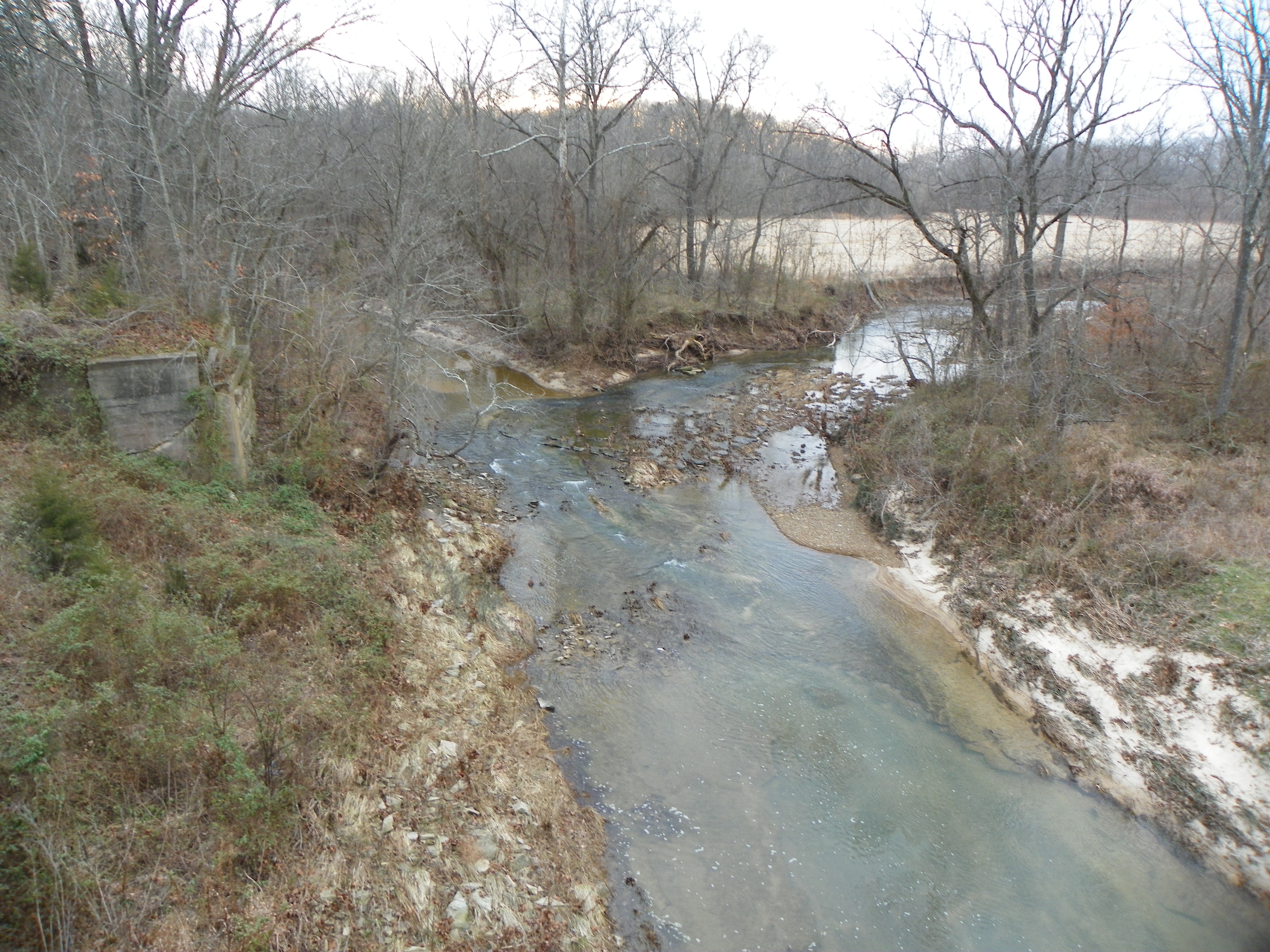
View south of Hwy 61 bridge

== See also ==
- List of rivers of Missouri
