= Sereno, Missouri =

Unincorporated community in Missouri, U.S.

- unincorporated community
- Location of Perry County, Missouri
- Coordinates: 37°47′52″N 89°51′04″W
- Country: United States
- State: Missouri
- County: Perry
- Township: Bois Brule
- Elevation: 620 ft (190 m)
- Time zone: UTC-6 (Central (CST))
  - Summer (DST): UTC-5 (CDT)
- ZIP code: 63775
- Area code: 573
- FIPS code: 29-66746
- GNIS feature ID: 726210

Sereno is an unincorporated community located in Bois Brule Township in Perry County, Missouri, United States. Sereno is located approximately five miles northeast of Perryville.

== Etymology ==
The early settlers of Sereno named the community Serena, meaning “a clean, respectable place”. However, when establishing a post office they discovered a place by that name already existed in Missouri, so the name was changed to Sereno.

== History ==
In 1884, Thomas Moore gave a small tract of his land along Chester Road to William Mattingly for the purpose of building a general store, which was soon followed by a grist mill. A post office operated from 1888 to 1905. The predominantly Catholic town established Our Lady of Victory Catholic parish in 1908.
