= List of Lutheran churches in the United States =

Churches whose coordinates appear below may be seen on a map by clicking above.

This is a list of notable Lutheran churches in the United States. There are numerous Lutheran church buildings in the U.S. that are listed on the National Register of Historic Places or that are otherwise notable.

The following colors represent the current denominational affiliation:

Lutheran Church – Missouri Synod (LCMS)
Evangelical Lutheran Church in America (ELCA)
Wisconsin Evangelical Lutheran Synod (WELS)
American Association of Lutheran Churches (AALC)
Inactive parish or unknown

Church	Image	Dates	Location	City, State	Notes
St. Mark's Lutheran Church		1908 founded 1927 built 1988 NRHP-listed	13220 Main St. 30°25′1″N 87°35′55″W	Elberta, Alabama	Offered German-language services from 1908 to until 1977
First Lutheran Church		1930 built 1987 NRHP-listed	1200 Tongass Avenue; 55°20′43″N 131°39′28″W	Ketchikan, Alaska	Carpenter Gothic
Sitka Lutheran Church		1843 founded 1967 rebuilt	224 Lincoln Street; 57°02′59″N 135°20′07″W	Sitka, Alaska	
First Evangelical Lutheran Church				Fort Smith, Arkansas	
First Lutheran Church				Hot Springs, Arkansas	
Trinity Lutheran Church				Atkins, Arkansas	
Faith Bible Church		1917 built 1976 LAHCM	18531 Gresham St. 34°6′6″N 118°20′27″W	Northridge, California	First church built in Northridge; originally formed from six Swedish families.
First Lutheran Church of Venice		1944 founded	815 Venice Blvd. 33°59′34″N 118°27′22″W	Venice, Los Angeles, California	Mission Revival building
First United Lutheran Church		1886 founded 1890-1944 in historic sanctuary	Now meets at St. Cyprian's Episcopal Church, 2097 Turk Street (at Lyon); 37°46′44″N 122°26′36″W	San Francisco, California	First primarily-English-speaking Lutheran church in California; its historic building survived the 1906 San Francisco earthquake.
Herchurch		1882 founded	678 Portola Drive; 37°44′42″N 122°27′12″W	San Francisco, California	Also known as Ebenezer Lutheran Church
Norwegian Seamen's Church / Swedish Seamen's Church		1946 founded	1035 South Beacon Street; 33°44′4″N 118°16′51″W	San Pedro, California	Serves seamen of about 160 Norwegian and Swedish ships each year, plus local Scandinavians
St. John's Lutheran Church				Orange, California	
St. Paulus Lutheran Church		1894 built 1982 NRHP	999 Eddy Street; 37°46′56″N 122°25′21″W	San Francisco, California	Its 1894-built Late Gothic Revival building appeared in Vertigo. It was NRHP- and SFDL-listed but burned down in 1995.
St. Francis Lutheran Church		1905 built 1971 SFDL	152 Church Street; 37°46′07″N 122°25′46″W	San Francisco, California	
All Saints Church of Eben Ezer		1916 built 1982 NRHP-listed	40°15′15″N 103°38′38″W	Brush, Colorado	
First Evangelical Lutheran Church		1890 built 1993 NRHP-listed	39°38′44″N 106°57′08″W	Gypsum, Colorado	Gothic revival
Ryssby Church		1882 built 1984 NRHP-listed	40°08′23″N 105°12′20″W	Longmont, Colorado	
St. Stephen's Lutheran Church		1964 built 2019 NRHP-listed	39°53′34″N 104°57′04″W	Northglenn, Colorado	Neo-expressionism
Zion's German Lutheran Church		1890 built 2006 NRHP-listed	37°10′24″N 104°30′49″W	Trinidad, Colorado	Victorian Gothic
Hope Lutheran Church		1917 built 1978 NRHP-listed	38°07′57″N 105°28′02″W	Westcliffe, Colorado	
Zion Lutheran Church		NRHP-listed		Stamford, Connecticut	
Lutheran Church of the Ascension				Savannah, Georgia	
Lutheran Church of the Redeemer				Atlanta, Georgia	
St. John's Lutheran Church				Atlanta, Georgia	
Cordelia Lutheran Church		1883 built 1995 NRHP	S. of jct. of Genesee-Troy and Danielson Rds; 46°39′37″N 116°53′50″W	Latah County, Idaho (near Moscow, Idaho?)	Oldest Lutheran building in Idaho.
Immanuel Evangelical Lutheran Church				Boise, Idaho	
Immanuel Hall		1900 built 2001 NRHP	41°47′57″N 87°55′56″W	Hinsdale, Illinois	Previously known as Immanuel Evangelical Church; Carpenter Gothic
Minnekirken				Illinois	Also known as Norwegian Lutheran Memorial Church
Old Danish Church				Illinois	
Prince of Peace Lutheran Church				Illinois	
Redeemer Lutheran Church				Elmhurst, Illinois	
St. Paulus Evangelisch Lutherischen Gemeinde				Illinois	
Evangelische Lutherische Emanuels Kirche		1901 built 1990 NRHP	38°27′59″N 86°49′23″W	near Dubois, Indiana	High Victorian Gothic
Mt. Pisgah Lutheran Church		1874–75 & 1887 built 1978 NRHP	39°46′37″N 86°9′20″W	Indianapolis, Indiana	Late Gothic Revival and Romanesque Revival; also known as First Lutheran Church and First English Lutheran Church
Saint James Lutheran Church and School				Lafayette, Indiana	
St. John's Lutheran Church				Ellettsville, Indiana	
Richwood Evangelical Lutheran Church		1868 built 2004 NRHP-listed	40°5′31″N 85°59′58″W	Cross Roads, Indiana	Gothic Revival
St. John's Lutheran Church and School		1867 built 1996 NRHP-listed	38°58′36″N 85°6′12″W	near Dillsboro, Indiana	Gothic Revival
St. George Lutheran Church		1867 built 1984 NRHP-listed	39°21′51″N 85°53′41″W	near Edinburgh, Indiana	Greek Revival
St. Paul's Evangelical Lutheran Church		1889 built 1982 NRHP-listed	41°4′32″N 85°8′8″W	Fort Wayne, Indiana	Gothic
St. John's Lutheran Church		1852–1853 built 1994 NRHP-listed	41°34′50″N 85°54′20″W	near Goshen, Indiana	Greek Revival
Immanuel Lutheran Church		1891 built 1982 NRHP-listed	42°28′16″N 87°3′38″W	Valparaiso, Indiana	Gothic, Victorian Gothic
St. Peter Lutheran Church		1872 founded 1873 built 1975 rebuilt	810 W. Talmer Avenue	North Judson, Indiana	
Danish Lutheran Church		1887 built 2011 NRHP-listed	42°40′18″N 95°18′16″W	Alta, Iowa	Gothic Revival
Our Savior's Kvindherred Lutheran Church		1861/1877 built 2000 NRHP-listed	2589 190th Ave. 41°48′26″N 90°43′26″W	Calamus, Iowa	Gothic Revival
St. Peters United Evangelical Lutheran Church		1858 built 1976 NRHP-listed	42°49′21″N 91°11′15″W	Ceres, Iowa	
Waterloo Ridge Lutheran Church		1913 built 2015 NRHP-listed	43°29′07.7″N 91°36′01.4″W	Dorchester, Iowa	Gothic Revival
New Sweden Chapel		1860 built 1977 NRHP-listed	41°01′27″N 91°46′48″W	East of Fairfield, Iowa	
St. John's Lutheran Church		1889/1899 built 2015 NRHP-listed	42°43′10″N 93°20′24″W	Hampton, Iowa	Late 19th and 20th century Revivals
Bethany Danish Evangelical Lutheran Church		1898 built 1991 NRHP-listed	41°39′8″N 95°3′11″W	Kimballton, Iowa	
Immanuel Danish Evangelical Lutheran Church		1904 built 1991 NRHP-listed	41°37′45.75″N 95°4′28.25″W	Kimballton, Iowa	Gothic Revival/Queen Anne
Ingemann Danish Lutheran Church		1884 built 2012 NRHP-listed	41°56′18.7″N 95°55′36.5″W	Moorhead, Iowa	
First Lutheran Church		1868 built 1976 NRHP-listed	43°22′48″N 92°55′32″W	St. Ansgar, Iowa	Vernacular Gothic Revival
Sheldahl First Norwegian Evangelical Lutheran Church		1883 built 1984 NRHP-listed	41°51′58″N 93°41′42″W	Sheldahl, Iowa	
Augustana Lutheran Church		1890 built 2006 NRHP-listed	42°29′47.7″N 96°23′45.9″W	Sioux City, Iowa	Gothic Revival
Swedish Evangelical Lutheran Church		1928 built 1999 NRHP-listed	41°6′19″N 91°32′43″W	Swedesburg, Iowa	Gothic Revival
Old East Paint Creek Lutheran Church		1868 built 1983 NRHP-listed	43°15′52″N 91°18′11″W	Waterville, Iowa	Gothic Revival
Danske Evangelist Lutheran Kirke				Kansas	
English Lutheran Church				Kansas	
Stony Point Evangelical Lutheran Church				Kansas	
Trinity Evangelical Lutheran Church				Abilene, Kansas	
Hopeful Lutheran Church				Kentucky	
St. Peter's German Evangelical Church				Kentucky	
St. Paul's Lutheran Church		1866 founded		Ashland, Kentucky	
St. Paul Lutheran Church				Mansura, Louisiana	
Swedish Lutheran Church				Monson, Maine	
Evangelical Lutheran Church				Frederick, Maryland	
Old Salem Church and Cemetery				Maryland	
St. John's Church				Maryland	
St. John's Lutheran Church				Maryland	
St. John's Lutheran Church				Maryland	
Town Clock Church				Maryland	
Zion Lutheran Church				Maryland	
Faith Lutheran Church				Massachusetts	
Gethsemane Evangelical Lutheran Church				Michigan	
Historic Trinity Lutheran Church				Michigan	
Jacobsville Finnish Lutheran Church				Michigan	
Our Saviour's Evangelical Lutheran Church				Michigan	
Saint John's Lutheran Church				Michigan	
St. John's Lutheran Church and School				Michigan	
St. John's–St. Luke's Evangelical Church				Michigan	
St. John's Lutheran Church				Port Hope, Michigan	
St. Peter's Lutheran Church				Kinde, Michigan	
Zion Evangelical Lutheran Church				Petoskey, Michigan	
Bethany Lutheran Church		1912–13 built CP NRHP-listed	46°09′34″N 88°45′42″W	Iron River, Michigan	
Bethlehem Lutheran Church		1915 built 1980 NRHP-listed	Kirke Alle; 46°11′17″N 92°46′41″W	Askov, Minnesota	A brick Gothic Revival church built for a Danish American community.
Bethlehem Lutheran Church		1897 built 1982 NRHP-listed	46°28′34″N 93°36′59″W	Aitkin, Minnesota	
Stiklestad United Lutheran Church		1898 built 1980 NRHP-listed	County Road 17; 46°10′38.2″N 96°24′34.4″W	Brandrup Township, Minnesota	Intact Carpenter Gothic church representative of the area's Norwegian immigrants.
Christiania Lutheran Free Church		built NRHP-listed		Eureka, Minnesota	
Trinity Lutheran Church		1898 built 2018 NRHP-listed	46°19′23.7″N 95°26′52.7″W	Henning, Minnesota	
Marysville Swedesburg Lutheran Church		1891 built 1979 NRHP-listed	2505 Dempsey Avenue SW; 45°6′57″N 93°57′8.5″W	Marysville Township, Minnesota	One of Wright County, Minnesota's finest examples of a brick Gothic Revival parish church; also associated with the area's Swedish immigrants.
Swedish Evangelical Lutheran Church		1874 built 1989 NRHP-listed	Bridge Street; 44°14′37.3″N 92°17′48″W	Millville, Minnesota	Used successively by Swedish, Norwegian, and German congregations; the only intact surviving ethnic church from the peak of European immigration to Wabasha County, Minnesota.
Central Lutheran Church		1928 built	333 South Twelfth Street, Minneapolis, MN; 44°58′10.5492″N 93°16′15.1068″W	Minneapolis, Minnesota	Architects: Sund & Dunham, built in the neo-Gothic style in 1928. The building is cruciform in shape with a ceiling height of some 65 feet, with 2,500 seats on the nave floor and galleries. The bell tower was built in 2004–04. Central's organ was installed in 1963 and is one of several significant instruments of this time designed by Lawrence Phelps.
Christ Church Lutheran		1948 built 2001 NRHP-listed	3244 34th Avenue S. 44°56′37″N 93°13′24″W	Minneapolis, Minnesota	Award-winning International Style church designed by Eliel Saarinen; a U.S. National Historic Landmark
Clearwater Evangelical Lutheran Church		1912 built 1999 NRHP-listed		Oklee, Minnesota	
Vista Lutheran Church		1908 built 1982 NRHP-listed	15035 275th Avenue; 43°57′26″N 93°27′57.5″W	Otisco Township, Minnesota	The best preserved structure symbolizing Waseca County's principal Swedish American settlement.
Valley Grove		1862 & 1894 built 1982 NRHP-listed	9999 155th Street E. 44°21′42″N 93°6′3″W	Wheeling Township, Minnesota	Rare tableau of a rural congregation's first and second churches, encapsulating two phases of ecclesiastical architecture and anchoring a dispersed community of Norwegian immigrants.
Augustana Lutheran Church				Minneapolis, Minnesota	
Christ Lutheran Church on Capitol Hill				Minnesota	
Christdala Evangelical Swedish Lutheran Church				Minnesota	
Cross of Christ Lutheran Church		NRHP-listed		Red Wing, Minnesota	
First Lutheran Church				Winthrop, Minnesota	
Grace University Lutheran Church				Minneapolis, Minnesota	
Gran Evangelical Lutheran Church				Minnesota	
Hauge Lutheran Church				Goodhue County, Minnesota	
Holden Lutheran Church Parsonage				Minnesota	
Immanuel Lutheran Church				Red Wing, Minnesota	
Kansas Lake Evangelical Lutheran Church				Minnesota	
Norway Lutheran Church				Minnesota	
Norwegian Lutheran Memorial Church				Minneapolis, Minnesota	
St. John's Lutheran Church				Isanti, Minnesota	
St. John's Lutheran Church				Northfield, Minnesota	
Saint Paul-Reformation Lutheran Church				Minnesota	
St. Paul's Evangelical Lutheran Church & Parsonage				Minnesota	
St. Pauli Norwegian Evangelical Lutheran Church				Minnesota	
Swedish Evangelical Lutheran Church				Ham Lake, Minnesota	
Trinity Episcopal Church				Stockton, Minnesota	
Trondhjem Norwegian Lutheran Church				Minnesota	
Zion Lutheran Church				Shelly, Minnesota	
Concordia Lutheran Church		1839 founded	10172 Hwy C 37°38′26″N 89°37′09″W	Frohna, Missouri	
Grace Lutheran Church		1839 founded, 1876 built	53 Grace Lane; 37°36′53″N 89°42′50″W	Uniontown, Missouri	
Hanover Lutheran Church		1846 founded 1969 rebuilt	2949 Perryville Road; 37°21′10″N 89°33′37″W	Cape Girardeau, Missouri	Its 1923 schoolhouse is NRHP-listed
Immanuel Evangelical Lutheran Church		1861 built 1979 NRHP-listed	E Pine and N Ziegler St. 37°37′34″N 90°38′29″W	Pilot Knob, Missouri	
Immanuel Lutheran Church		1856 founded, 1858 built	8234 Main St, 37°37′41″N 89°35′42″W	Altenburg, Missouri	
Immanuel Lutheran Church		1844 founded 1851 built	453 N West St. 37°43′10″N 89°48′38″W	Perryville, Missouri	
Friedens Evangelical Lutheran Church		1899 built 2004 NRHP-listed	309 S. Harrison Ave. 38°34′44″N 90°24′39″W	Kirkwood, Missouri	Gothic Revival; The church building was bought from Friedens Evangelical Lutheran Church in 1923
Peace Lutheran Church		1840 founded 1885 built	510 Perry County Road 304; 37°42′03″N 89°47′38″W	Central Township, Perry County, Missouri	
Pilgrim Lutheran Church for the Deaf of Greater Kansas City		1941 built 2001 NRHP-listed	3801-3807 Gilham Rd. 39°3′36″N 94°35′33″W	Kansas City, Missouri	Late Gothic Revival
Salem Lutheran Church		1859 founded 1886 built	299 Perry County Road 328; 37°42′08″N 89°41′19″W	Salem Township, Perry County, Missouri	
St. John's Evangelical Lutheran Church		1860 founded 1893 built 2008 NRHP-listed	112 Walters Street; 40°14′52″N 95°27′16″W	Corning, Missouri	Permanently closed after the 2013 Missouri River floods
St. Paul's Church		1844 founded 1860 built 1982 NRHP-listed	150 West Highway D 38°42′31″N 90°52′56″W	New Melle, Missouri	
St. John's Evangelical Lutheran Church		1867 founded 1870 built	159 Little Street; 37°30′05″N 89°38′17″W	Pocahontas, Missouri	
Trinity Lutheran Church		1839 founded 1867 rebuilt 1979 NRHP-listed	57 Church Street; 37°38′26″N 89°37′09″W	Altenburg, Missouri	
Trinity Lutheran Church		1874 founded 1954 rebuilt	207 N. Main Street; 37°01′08″N 93°53′52″W	Freistatt, Missouri	
Trinity Lutheran Church		1843 founded 1857 built	3700 Country Road 415; 37°34′11″N 89°49′07″W	Friedheim, Missouri	
Trinity Lutheran Church		1839 founded 1896 rebuilt	812 Soulard St. 38°36′33″N 90°12′10″W	St. Louis, Missouri	Oldest Lutheran church in the US west of the Mississippi River
Zion Lutheran Church		1906 built 2000 NRHP-listed	2348 Zion Rd. 38°32′10″N 92°15′11″W	Jefferson Township, Cole County, Missouri	
Zion Lutheran Church		1897 founded 1912 built	6483 S Highway 61; 37°40′12″N 89°46′25″W	Longtown, Missouri	
Bethany Lutheran Church		1912 founded 1923 built 1993 NRHP-listed	.25 miles south of Gus Blaze Rd. 48°41′37″N 111°38′41″W	Oilmont, Montana	
Grace Lutheran Church of Barber				Montana	
Rocky Valley Lutheran Church				Montana	
Dannevirke Danish Lutheran Church and Community Hall				Nebraska	
Kountze Memorial Lutheran Church				Nebraska	
Pella Lutheran Church				Nebraska	
St. Johannes Danske Lutherske Kirke				Nebraska	
St. John's Evangelical Lutheran German Church and Cemetery				Nebraska	
St. John's German Evangelical Lutheran Church				Nebraska	
St. Peder's Dansk Evangelical Lutheran Kirke				Nebraska	
Swedish Evangelical Lutheran Salem Church				Nebraska	
St. James Lutheran Church		1760 founded 1834 built 2016 NRHP-listed	1213 U.S. Route 22; 40°40′49″N 75°8′45″W	Pohatcong Township, New Jersey	Federal
Evangelical Lutheran Church of Saddle River and Ramapough Building				New Jersey	
Jacobus Evangelical Lutheran Church				New Jersey	
St. John's Evangelical Lutheran Church				New Jersey	
Spruce Run Evangelical Lutheran Zion Church				New Jersey	
Swack Church				New Jersey	
Advent Lutheran Church				New York City	
Christ Church Lutheran				New York City	
Evangelical Lutheran Church of St. Matthew				New York City	
Holy Cross Armenian Apostolic Church				New York City	
Holy Trinity Lutheran Church				New York City	
Iglesia Pentecostal La Luz del Mundo				New York City	
Messiah Mission Church				New York City	
Our Saviour's Atonement Lutheran Church				New York City	
St. Johannes Kirche				New York City	
St. Luke's Lutheran Church				New York City	
Our Saviour New York				New York City	
Trinity Lutheran Church				New York City	
Trinity Evangelical Lutheran Church of Manhattan				New York City	
Zion-St. Mark's Evangelical Lutheran Church				New York City	
Christ Evangelical English Lutheran Church		built NRHP-listed		Brooklyn, New York	
Christ Lutheran Church and Parsonage		built NRHP-listed		Ellenville, New York	
Emmanuel Lutheran Church of Harlemville and Cemetery				New York State	
First Lutheran Church				New York State	
Gallupville Evangelical Lutheran Church				New York State	
German Evangelical Lutheran Church of St. Mark				New York State	
Norwegian Seamen's Church, New York				New York State	
Oppenheim and St. Johnsville Union Society Church				New York State	
Palatine Church				New York State	
St. Andrew's Evangelical Lutheran Church Complex				New York State	
St. John's Lutheran Church				New York State	
St. John's Evangelical Lutheran Church				New York State	
St. John's Lutheran Church				New York State	
St. Mark's Evangelical Lutheran Church				New York State	
St. Mark's Lutheran Church				New York State	
Old Christ Church Lutheran				New York State	
St. Paul's (Zion's) Evangelical Lutheran Church				New York State	
St. Paul's Lutheran Church				New York State	
St. Paul's Lutheran Church				New York State	
St. Paul's Lutheran Church				New York State	
St. Paul's Evangelical Lutheran Church				New York State	
Evangelical Lutheran Church of St. Peter				New York State	
Trinity Lutheran Church and Cemetery				New York State	
Zion Lutheran Church				New York State	
Bethany Reformed and Lutheran Church Cemetery		built NRHP-listed		Midway, North Carolina	
Emmanuel Lutheran Church				North Carolina	
Zion Lutheran Church				North Carolina	
St. John's Lutheran Church				North Carolina	
St. Matthew's Lutheran Church				North Carolina	
Salem Union Church and Cemetery				North Carolina	
Trinity Lutheran Church				North Carolina	
Grace Episcopal Church				North Dakota	
Evangelical Lutheran Trinity Church				North Dakota	
Hope Lutheran Church				North Dakota	
Icelandic Evangelical Lutheran Church				North Dakota	
North Trinity Church				North Dakota	
Norway Lutheran Church and Cemetery				North Dakota	
Odalen Lutherske Kirke				North Dakota	
Our Savior's Scandinavian Lutheran Church				North Dakota	
St. Andrews Evangelical German Lutheran Church				North Dakota	
St. Paul's Lutheran Church				North Dakota	
St. Olaf Lutheran Church				North Dakota	
United Lutheran Church				North Dakota	
Vang Evangelical Lutheran Church				North Dakota	
Viking Lutheran Church				North Dakota	
Vikur Lutheran Church at Mountain				North Dakota	
Casstown Lutheran Stone Church		1839 built 1984 NRHP-listed	11 S. Main St. 40°3′2″N 84°7′44″W	Casstown, Ohio	
Apostolic Bethlehem Temple Church				Ohio	
Casstown Lutheran Stone Church				Ohio	
Emanuel Lutheran Church of Montra				Ohio	
Emmanuel's Evangelical Lutheran Church				Ohio	
First English Lutheran Church				Ohio	
First Lutheran Church				Ohio	
Jacob's Church				Ohio	
St. John's Evangelical Lutheran Church				Ohio	
St. John's Evangelical Lutheran Church				Ohio	
St. John's Lutheran Church				Ohio	
St. Peter's Evangelical Lutheran Church				Ohio	
St. Peter's Evangelical Lutheran Church				Ohio	
Salem Bear Creek Church, Salem Evangelical Lutheran Church				Ohio	
Trinity German Evangelical Lutheran Church				Ohio	
Trinity Lutheran Church				Ohio	
Trinity Lutheran Church				Ohio	
Zion Lutheran Church				Ohio	
Zion Lutheran Church				Ohio	
Calvary Lutheran Church & Parsonage		1891 built 1985 NRHP-listed	310–314 Jersey Street; 45°00′16″N 122°46′49″W	Silverton, Oregon	Gothic Revival, Queen Anne, Bungalow/Craftsman, Greek Revival
Faith Lutheran Church				Oregon	
Greasewood Finnish Apostolic Lutheran Church				Oregon	
Macksburg Lutheran Church				Canby, Oregon	
St. James Lutheran Church				Oregon	
Zion Lutheran Church				Oregon	
Christ Hamilton United Lutheran Church and Cemetery		built NRHP-listed		Hamilton Square, Pennsylvania	
Bindnagles Evangelical Lutheran Church		1803 built 1975 NRHP-listed	North of Palmyra at the junction of Legislative Route 38003 and Township 330, North Londonderry Township; 40°20′38″N 76°37′1″W	Palmyra, Pennsylvania	Georgian, Georgian vernacular
Augustus Lutheran Church		1743 built 1969 NRHP-listed	717 Main Street40°12′07″N 75°28′50″W	Trappe, Pennsylvania	Further designated a U.S. National Historic Landmark
Holy Trinity Lutheran Church				Pennsylvania	
Peace Church				Pennsylvania	
St. John's Evangelical Lutheran Church				Pennsylvania	
St. Michael's Evangelical Lutheran Church				Pennsylvania	
St. Peter's Kierch				Pennsylvania	
Trinity Lutheran Church				Pennsylvania	
Zion Evangelical Lutheran Church				Pennsylvania	
Zion Lutheran Church				Pennsylvania	
Gloria Dei Evangelical Lutheran Church				Rhode Island	
Cedar Grove Lutheran Church				South Carolina	
Ebenezer Lutheran Chapel				South Carolina	
Music Hall Evangelical Lutheran Church				South Carolina	
St. John's Lutheran Church				South Carolina	
St. John's Lutheran Church				South Carolina	
St. Matthew's German Evangelical Lutheran Church				South Carolina	
Trinity Lutheran Church				South Carolina	
Bradley First Lutheran Church		built NRHP-listed		Bradley, South Dakota	
Canton Lutheran Church		built NRHP-listed		Canton, South Dakota	
Augustana Swedish Lutheran Church		1899 built 1988 NRHP-listed	45°36′4″N 98°0′2″W	Claremont, South Dakota	Modified Nave Plan, Other architecture
Clark Center Lutheran Church		built NRHP-listed		Clark, South Dakota	
Bethel Lutheran Church		built NRHP-listed		Faith, South Dakota	
Aurland United Norwegian Lutheran Church		1905 built 1982 NRHP-listed	45°46′14″N 98°24′52″W	Frederick, South Dakota	
Duck Creek Lutheran Church and Cemetery				South Dakota	
East Highland Lutheran Church				South Dakota	
Emmanuel Lutheran Church and Cemetery				South Dakota	
Finnish Apostolic Lutheran Church				South Dakota	
Golden Valley Norwegian Lutheran Church				South Dakota	
Good Hope Lutheran Church				South Dakota	
Goodhue Lutheran Church				South Dakota	
Immanuel Lutheran Church				South Dakota	
Immanuel Lutheran Church				South Dakota	
Lake Madison Lutheran Church				South Dakota	
Lebanon Lutheran Church				South Dakota	
Old Finnish Lutheran Church				South Dakota	
Our Savior's Lutheran Church				South Dakota	
Palestine Evangelical Lutheran Church				South Dakota	
Renner Lutheran Church		NRHP-listed		Renner, South Dakota	Also known as Renner Lutheran Sanctuary
St. Peter's Lutheran Church				South Dakota	
Singsaas Lutheran Church				South Dakota	
Swedish Lutheran Church of Strandburg				South Dakota	
Telemarken Lutheran Church				Wallace, South Dakota	
Walla Lutheran Church				South Dakota	
Zion Lutheran Church				South Dakota	
Zoar Norwegian Lutheran Church				South Dakota	
Jenkins Lutheran Chapel and Cemetery				Tennessee	
St. John's Lutheran Church				Knoxville, Tennessee	
Shofner's Lutheran Chapel				Tennessee	
Bethlehem Lutheran Church		1866 built 1978 NRHP-listed	409 S White St. 30°3′47.11″N 96°41′59.02″W	Round Top, Texas	Carl Siegismund Bauer
Emanuel Lutheran Church				Dallas, Texas	
First Lutheran Church				Houston, Texas	
Immanuel Lutheran Church				Houston, Texas	
Our Savior's Lutheran Church				Texas	
St. Olaf Kirke				Texas	
Trinity English Lutheran Church				Texas	
Trinity Lutheran Church				Victoria, Texas	
Zion Lutheran Church				Fredericksburg, Texas	
Burke's Garden Central Church and Cemetery				Virginia	
Hebron Lutheran Church				Virginia	
Kimberling Lutheran Cemetery				Virginia	
Mount Calvary Lutheran Church				Virginia	
Old Stone Church				Virginia	
St. John's Lutheran Church and Cemetery				Virginia	
Sharon Lutheran Church and Cemetery				Virginia	
Bethsaida Swedish Evangelical Lutheran Church Parsonage		1890 built 1990 NRHP	48°23′29″N 122°26′32″W	La Conner, Washington	Parsonage listed on National Register of church which was built in 1890.
Freeborn Lutheran Church				Washington	
Deep River Pioneer Lutheran Church				Washington	
Elbe Evangelical Lutheran Church				Washington	
Immanuel Lutheran Church				Seattle, Washington	
Hebron Church				West Virginia	
Old Probst Church				West Virginia	
Daniels Town Hall		1892 built 2006 NRHP	45°46′8″N 92°28′40″W	Daniels, Wisconsin	Built and used by Swedish Lutherans from 1886 to 1893. Formerly known as Mudhen Lake Lutheran Church
Bethania Scandinavian Evangelical Lutheran Congregation		1882 built 1985 NRHP	3028 Church St. 45°09′20″N 87°10′08″W	Ephraim, Wisconsin	Established by six families in 1882; was conducting services in Norwegian in 1898. Also known as Bethany Lutheran Church of Ephraim.
Christ Evangelical Lutheran Church		1901 built 1987 NRHP	43°1′1.19″N 87°56′30.50″W	Milwaukee, Wisconsin	Church founded in 1884; 1901 building designed in German Gothic Revival by architect Frederick Velguth.
Dansk Evangelical Lutheran Kirke		1910 built 1988 NRHP	400 W. Capitol Dr. 43°06′09″N 88°21′10″W	Hartland, Wisconsin	Congregation with services in Danish until 1931; church building has elements of Late Gothic Revival and Romanesque Revival.
Zion Evangelical Lutheran Church		nrhp-LISTED		Hartland, Wisconsin	
Lutheran Church of the Good Shepherd				Eau Claire, Wisconsin	
First English Lutheran Church				New Richmond, Wisconsin	
First Lutheran Church				Middleton, Wisconsin	
Hauge Log Church				Wisconsin	
Heart Prairie Lutheran Church				Wisconsin	
Immanuel Evangelical Lutheran Church				Mayville, Wisconsin	
Luther Memorial Church				Wisconsin	
Lutheran Indian Mission				Wisconsin	
Mount Pleasant Lutheran Church				Wisconsin	
Saint James Evangelical Lutheran Church				Wisconsin	
Saint John Evangelical Lutheran Church				New Fane, Wisconsin	
Saint John's Evangelical Lutheran Church				Milwaukee, Wisconsin	
St. John's Lutheran Church				Evansville, Wisconsin	
St. Paul Evangelical Lutheran Church				Appleton, Wisconsin	
St. Peter's Evangelical Lutheran Church				Milwaukee, Wisconsin	
Saint Stephen Evangelical Lutheran Church of Milwaukee				Milwaukee, Wisconsin	
St. Lucas Evangelical German Lutheran Church and Cemetery				Wisconsin	
St. Martini Evangelical Lutheran Church				Wisconsin	
Trinity Evangelical Lutheran Church				Wisconsin	
West Luther Valley Lutheran Church				Wisconsin	
Westby Coon-Prairie Lutheran Church				Wisconsin	
Zion Evangelical Lutheran Church and Parsonage				Wisconsin	
Zion Lutheran Church				Appleton, Wisconsin	

== See also ==
- List of Lutheran churches
- Christianity in the United States
- List of Lutheran denominations in North America
