= Swedish Evangelical Lutheran Church =

Swedish Evangelical Lutheran Church may refer to:

in the United States

(by state)

- Swedish Evangelical Lutheran Church of Ryssby, Boulder, CO, listed on the NRHP in Colorado
- Swedish Evangelical Lutheran Augustana Church, Sioux City, IA, listed on the NRHP in Iowa
- Swedish Evangelical Lutheran Church (Swedesburg, Iowa), listed on the NRHP in Iowa
- Swedish Evangelical Lutheran Church (Ham Lake, Minnesota), listed on the NRHP in Minnesota
- Swedish Evangelical Lutheran Church (Millville, Minnesota), listed on the NRHP in Minnesota
- Zion Swedish Evangelical Lutheran Church, Anaconda, MT, listed on the NRHP in Montana
- Swedish Evangelical Lutheran Salem Church, Wakefield, NE, listed on the NRHP in Nebraska
- Swedish Evangelical Mission Covenant Church, Portland, OR, listed on the NRHP in Oregon
- Bethsaida Swedish Evangelical Lutheran Church Parsonage, La Conner, WA, listed on the NRHP in Washington
- Swedish Evangelical Lutheran Carmel Congregation, Calumet, MI, listed here: https://nordicamericanchurches.org/church/carmel-swedish-lutheran-church/
- Swedish Evangelical Lutheran Church (Tustin, Michigan), listed as a Michigan state historic site
