= Salem Bear Creek Church, Salem Evangelical Lutheran Church =

Historic church in Ohio, United States

- U.S. National Register of Historic Places
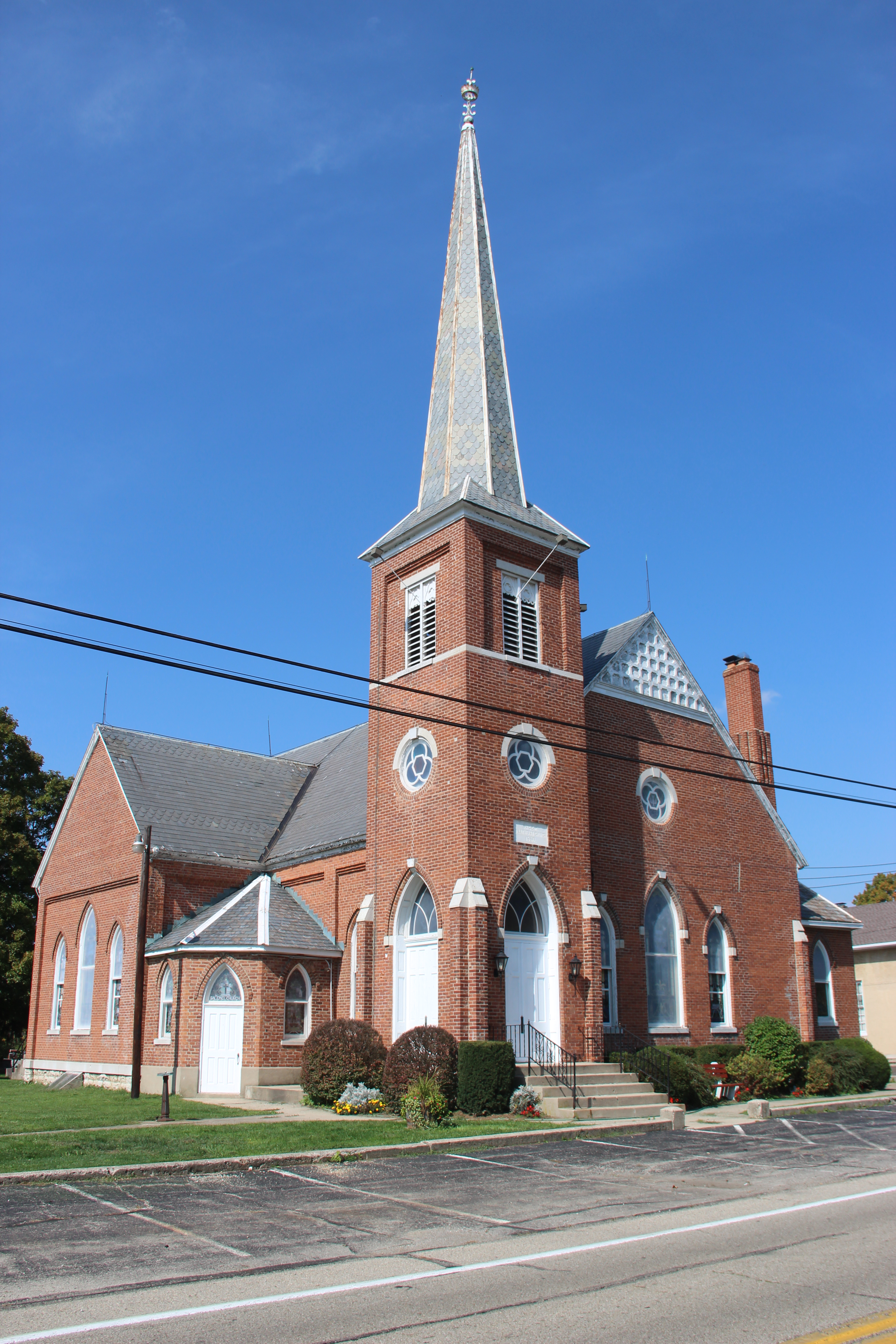

- Location within Ohio Location within the United States
- Location: Roughly bounded by Union Rd., Dayton Germantown Pike, and Bear Creek, Germantown, Ohio
- Coordinates: 39°40′48″N 84°18′34″W
- Area: 6 acres (2.4 ha)
- Built: 1817
- Architectural style: Gothic Revival
- MPS: Pennsylvania German Churches of Ohio MPS
- NRHP reference No.: 90001291
- Added to NRHP: September 6, 1990

Salem Bear Creek Church, Salem Evangelical Lutheran Church (Ellerton Lutheran and German Reformed Church District) is a historic district roughly bounded by Union Road, Dayton Germantown Pike, and Bear Creek in Moraine, Ohio.

The area was added to the National Register of Historic Places in 1990. 4573 S Union Rd, Miamisburg, OH 45342
