= St. Johannes Kirche (New York City) =

Demolished church in Manhattan, New York

Coordinates: 40.79971°N 73.93775°W

The Former Jones Chapel
- Interactive map of the The Former Jones Chapel area

General information
- Location: New York, New York, United States of America
- Construction started: ?
- Completed: 1873
- Demolished: 2007
- Cost: ?
- Client: U.A.L.

Technical details
- Structural system: Masonry

Design and construction
- Architect: ?
- Engineer: ?

St. Johannes Kirche was a former Lutheran church located at 217 East 119th Street between Second and Third Avenues in East Harlem, Manhattan, New York City. It was built in 1873 and reused as Iglesia Luterana Sion by the Lutheran Church in America: “An early masonry church for this community, then remote from the center of the city much further downtown. The church began as a home for a German-speaking congregation—today it serves those who speak Spanish.” It was demolished in 2007 and the lot has laid vacant for years.
