= Evangelical Lutheran Trinity Church =

Historic church in North Dakota, United States

- Evangelisch Lutheraner Dreieinigkeit Gemeinde
- U.S. National Register of Historic Places
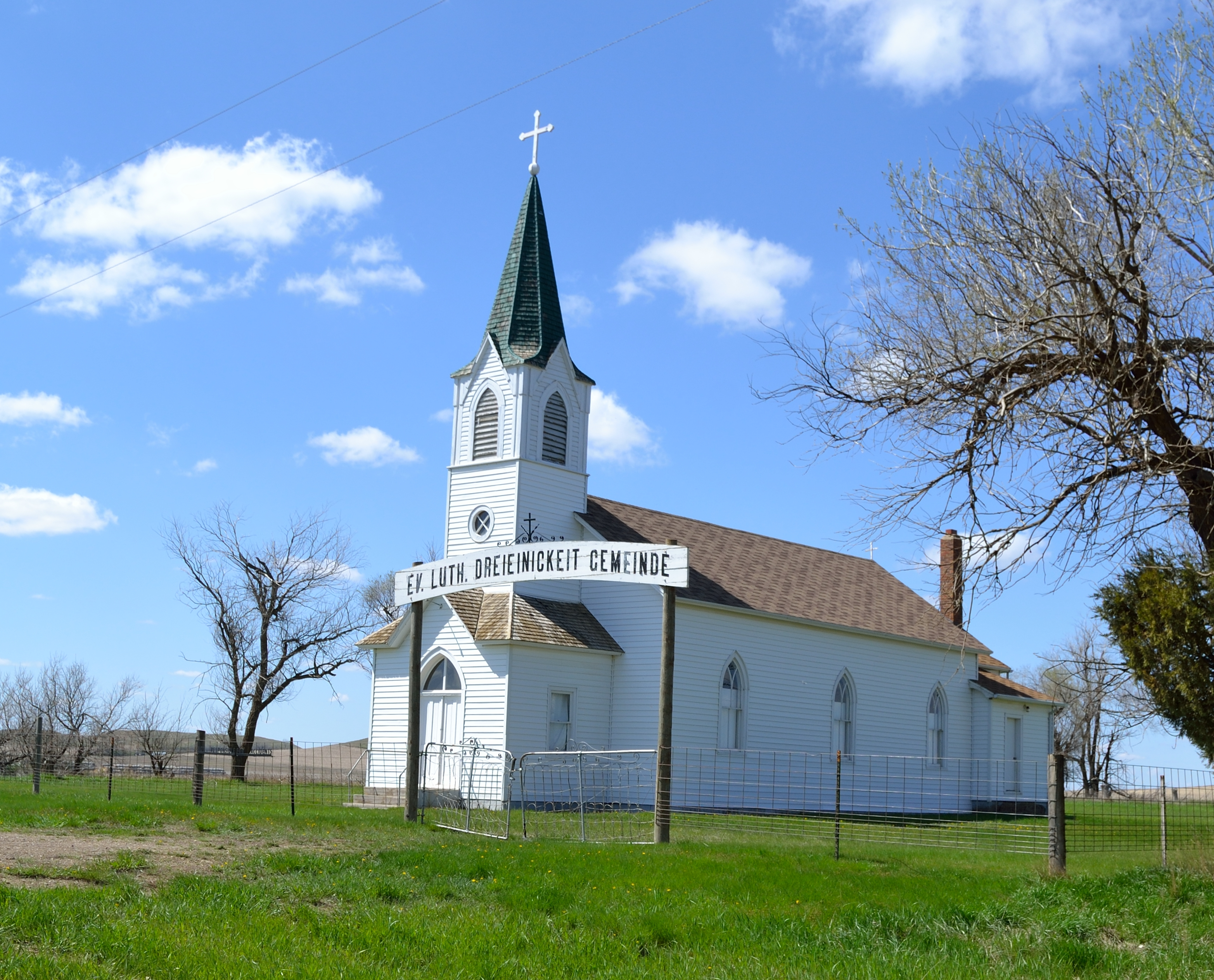

- Location within North Dakota Location within the United States
- Nearest city: New Leipzig, North Dakota
- Coordinates: 46°30′11″N 101°58′0″W
- Area: 1 acre (0.40 ha)
- Built: 1902-1905
- Built by: Bellman, Henry
- Architectural style: Late Gothic Revival
- NRHP reference No.: 09000530
- Added to NRHP: September 9, 2009

Evangelisch Lutheraner Dreieinigkeit Gemeinde, or Evangelical Lutheran Trinity Church is near New Leipzig, North Dakota. It has also been known as Trinity Heupel Church and as Heupel Church. The church building was listed on the National Register of Historic Places (NRHP) in 2009

== History ==
The church was founded by immigrants who were Germans from Russia. The NRHP listing included one contributing building and one contributing object. It was built by Henry Bellman and others during 1902–1905 in Late Gothic Revival style.

In 1959 the church building was sold. In 1961 former members of the Trinity Lutheran Church purchased it and the land around it as a memorial landmark renaming it "Trinity Heupel Church". The church is now used for weddings, funerals, and an annual potluck meal.
