= Dannevirke Danish Lutheran Church and Community Hall =

Historic church in Nebraska, United States

- U.S. National Register of Historic Places
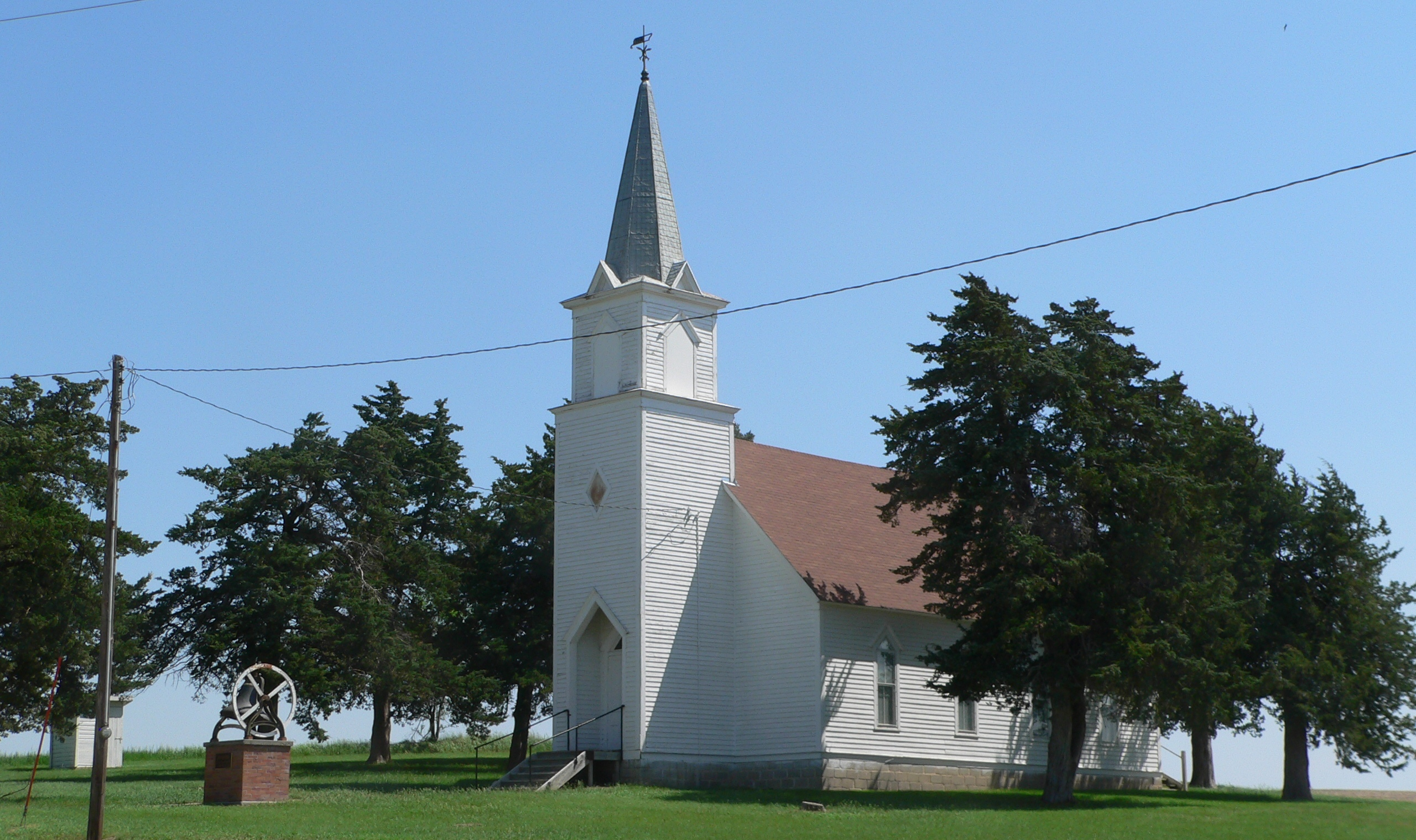

- Location within Nebraska Location within the United States
- Location: Dannervirke Rd. and Wausa, Elba, Nebraska
- Coordinates: 41°19′19″N 98°42′29″W
- Area: 1 acre (0.40 ha)
- Built: 1901
- Architect: Jensen, Harry
- Architectural style: Classical Revival, Gothic Revival
- NRHP reference No.: 99000750
- Added to NRHP: June 25, 1999

Dannevirke Danish Lutheran Church and Community Hall is a historic church at Dannervirke Road and Wausa in Elba, Nebraska. The church was founded by Danish Americans and the congregation maintained strong ties to their Danish heritage and language.

It was built in 1901 and was added to the National Register in 1999.
