= Daniels Town Hall =

- U.S. National Register of Historic Places
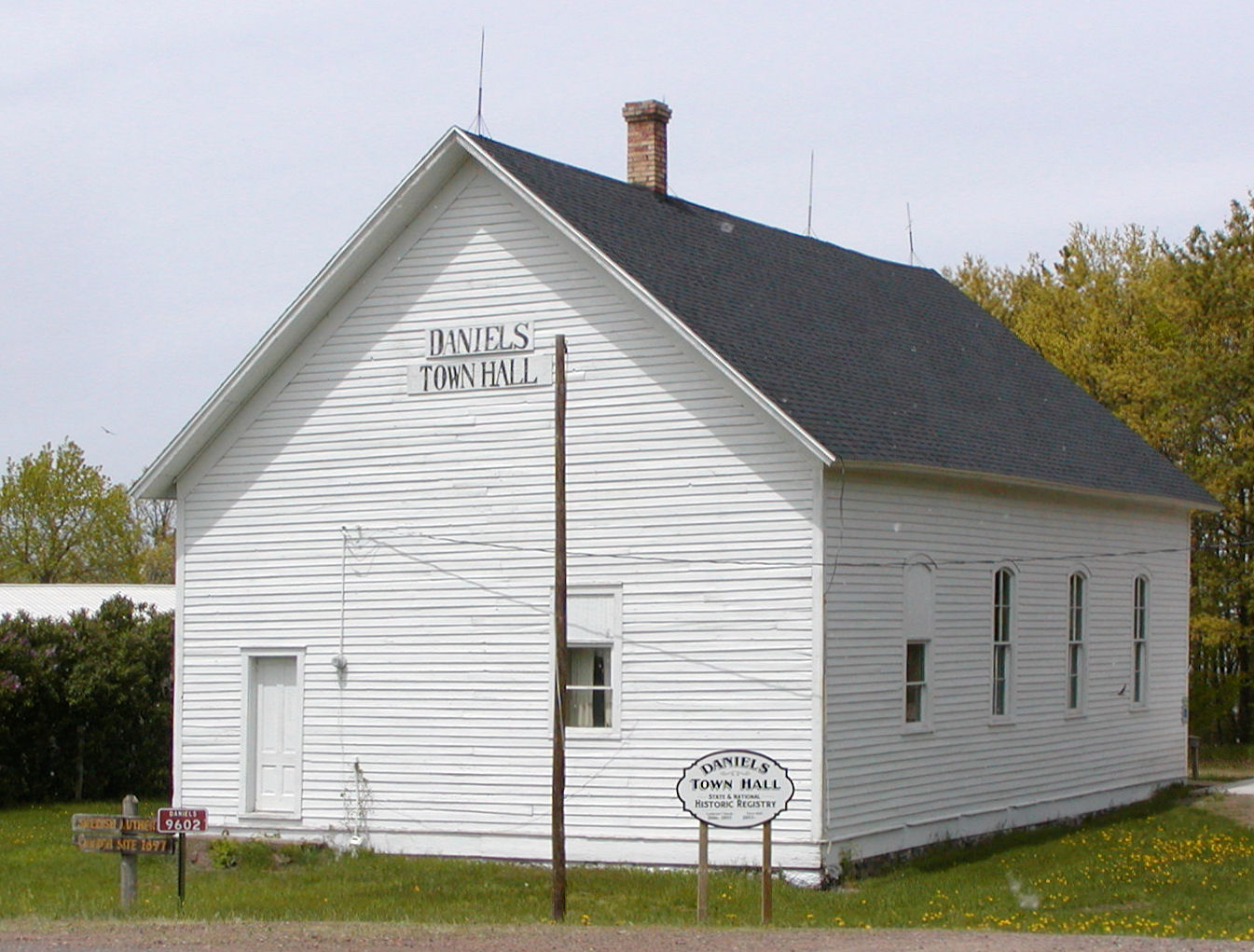

- Location within Wisconsin Location within the United States
- Nearest city: Daniels, Wisconsin
- Coordinates: 45°46′8″N 92°28′40″W
- Area: less than one acre
- Built: 1892
- Architectural style: Mid 19th Century Revival
- NRHP reference No.: 06001154
- Added to NRHP: December 20, 2006

Daniels Town Hall (formerly known as Mudhen Lake Lutheran Church) is a historic building in Daniels, Wisconsin.

Swedish Lutherans built this church at Mud Hen Lake in 1886, but the congregation moved in 1893. The building has been the Daniels Town Hall ever since. It was added to the National Register in 2006.
