= St. Mark's Lutheran Church (Elberta, Alabama) =

Historic church in Alabama, United States

- U.S. National Register of Historic Places
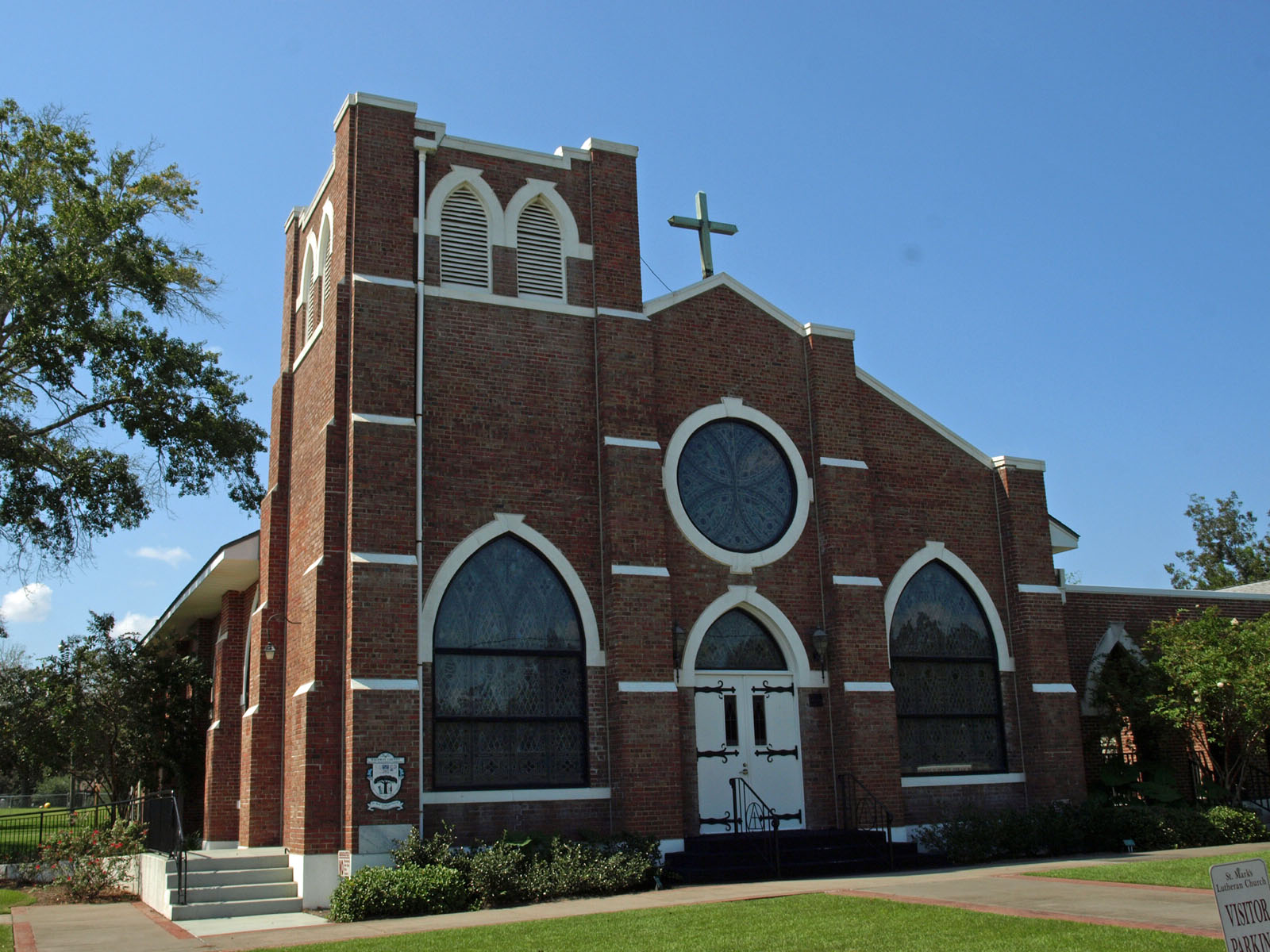

- Location within Alabama Location within the United States
- Location: 13220 Main St., Elberta, Alabama
- Coordinates: 30°25′1″N 87°35′55″W
- Area: 3.8 acres (1.5 ha)
- Built: 1927
- Architectural style: Late 19th And 20th Century Revivals, Medieval Revival
- MPS: Rural Churches of Baldwin County TR
- NRHP reference No.: 88001353
- Added to NRHP: August 25, 1988

St. Mark's Lutheran Church is a congregation of the Lutheran Church–Missouri Synod in Elberta, Alabama, United States, established in 1908. It is noted for its historic church on the east side CR 83, which was built in 1927 and added to National Register of Historic Places in 1988.

The congregation was formed in 1908 by Reverend W. C. Kohn of Chicago, and originally held services in German, as the original settlers of Elberta were German immigrants. German language services in the church continued until 1977. The congregation was headed by Reverend Keith Ringers as of 1988.
