= Danske Evangelist Lutheran Kirke =

Historic church in Kansas, United States

- U.S. National Register of Historic Places
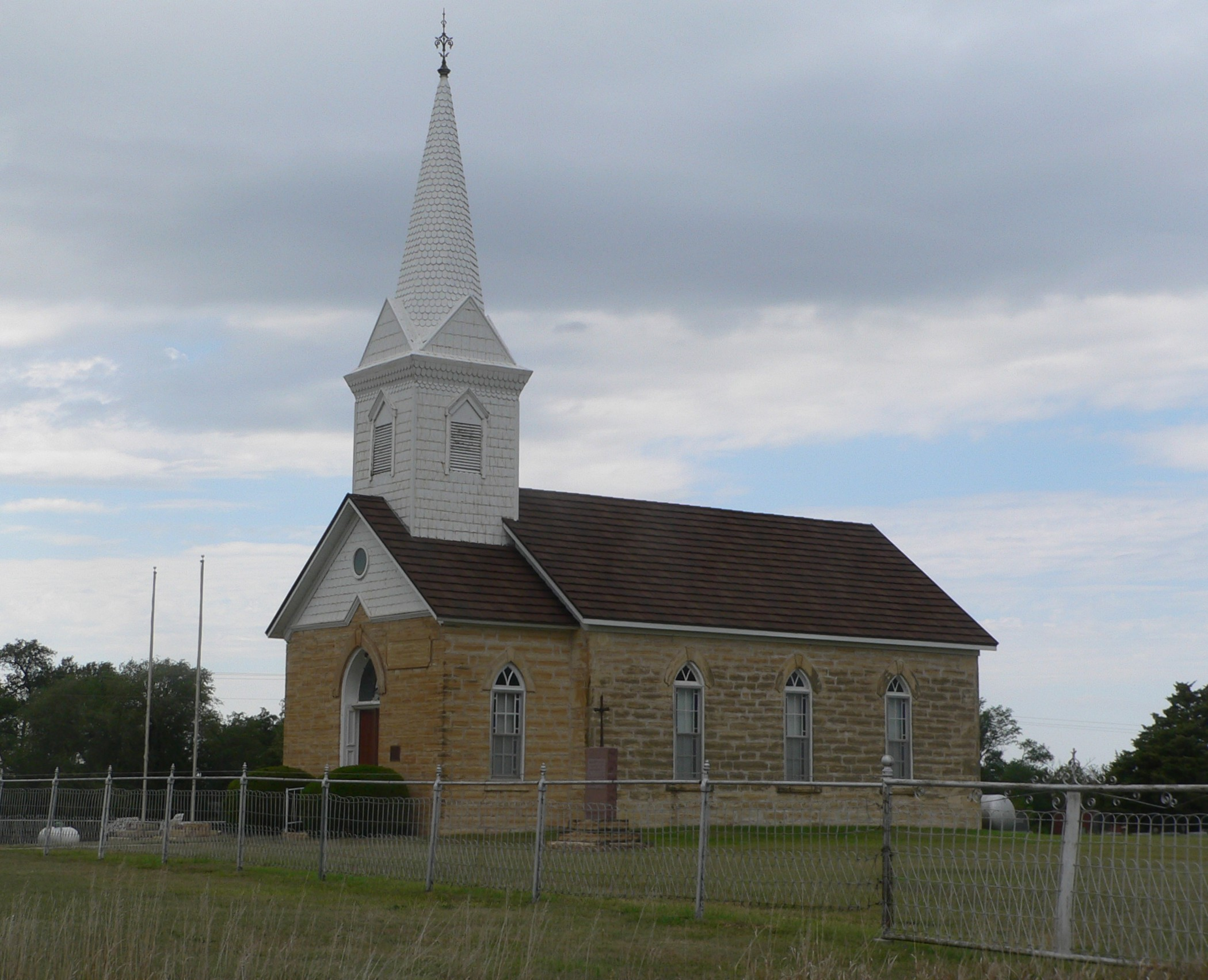

- Location within Kansas Location within the United States
- Nearest city: Denmark, Kansas
- Coordinates: 39°5′21.85″N 98°16′42.1″W
- Built: c.1875-1880
- Built by: Morganson, James; Rasmussen, Anders
- Architectural style: Gothic
- NRHP reference No.: 91001154
- Added to NRHP: September 12, 1991

The Denmark Evangelical Lutheran Community Church, formerly known as the Danske Evangelist Lutheran Kirke (Danish: Danish Evangelical Lutheran Church; Denmark Evangelical Lutheran Church) is a Lutheran church in Denmark, Kansas. It was added to the National Register in 1991.

== Design ==
It is a one-story gable-front building made of limestone. Its main portion was built between 1875 and 1880 and its bell tower and entry were added in 1901. It is 26 by 46.5 feet (7.9 m × 14.2 m) in plan. It includes Gothic detailing.

== History ==
The Danske Evangelist Lutheran Kirke was constructed between 1875 and 1880 with funding from the local Danish Society of the Lutheran Church for the local Danish community that had settled there and needed a place for Christian worship. Worship services were originally held in Danish with an English language Sunday School being established at the same time. This continued until 1883 when the new pastor insisted on Danish only and set up a Danish Sunday School instead. English-speaking congregants split from the church and set up their own church. The church remained Danish-only until 1920, when it resumed using English as the main language for worship. In 1956, the church amended its constitution to change its name from Danske Evangelist Lutheran Kirke to Denmark Evangelical Lutheran Community Church. Whilst many businesses and public services in Denmark have ceased operating, the church remains open and performing Christian services. They have enjoyed tax-exempt status since 1988.
