= Old Finnish Lutheran Church =

Historic church in South Dakota, United States

- U.S. National Register of Historic Places
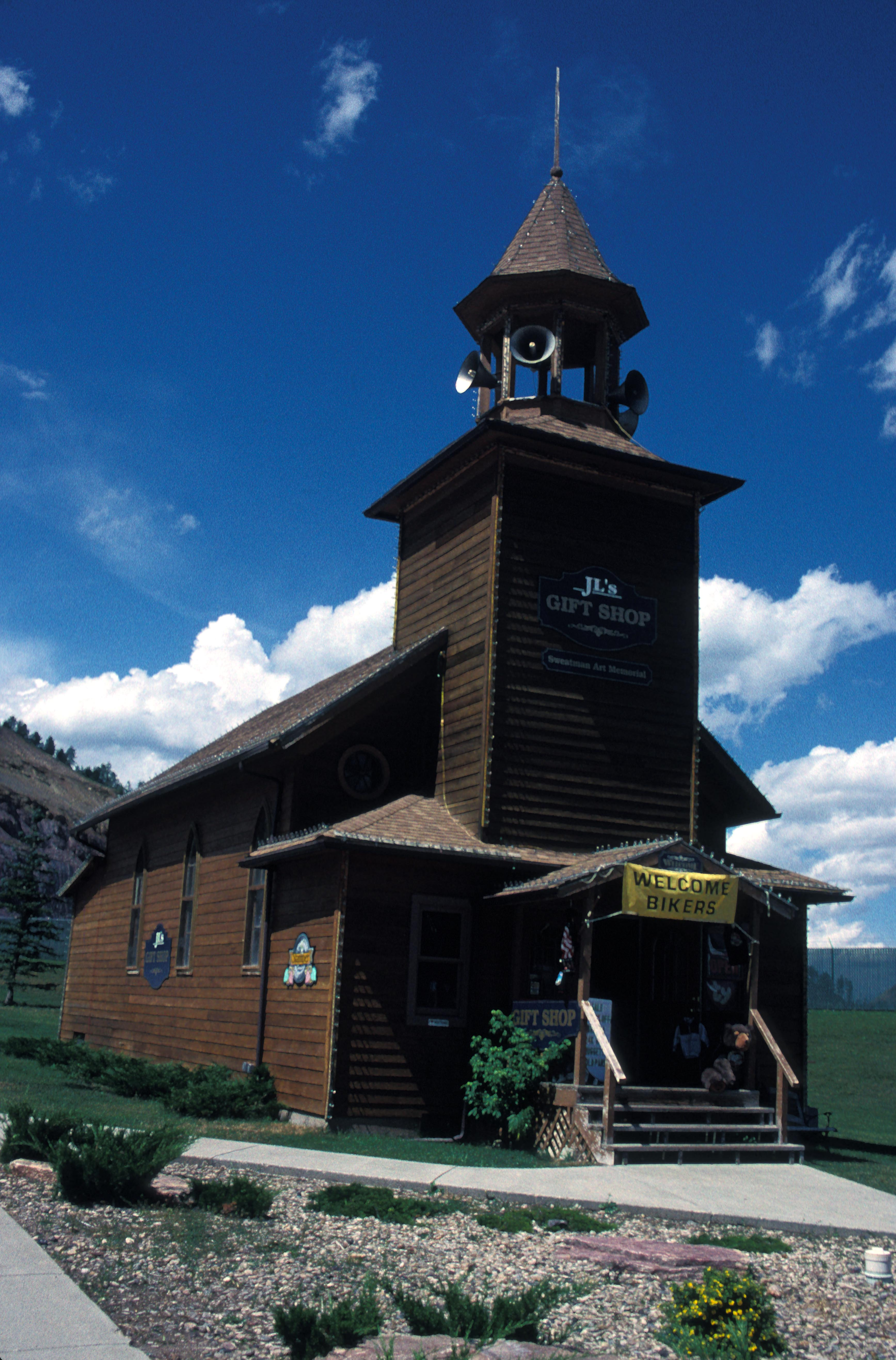

- Location within South Dakota Location within the United States
- Location: Sinking Gardens, E. Main St., Lead, South Dakota
- Coordinates: 44°21′9″N 103°45′50″W
- Area: less than one acre
- Built: 1891, 1907
- Built by: Niemi, John; Saari, John
- MPS: Architecture of Finnish Settlement TR
- NRHP reference No.: 85003487
- Added to NRHP: November 13, 1985

Old Finnish Lutheran Church is a historic church in Sinking Gardens on E. Main Street in Lead, South Dakota. It was built in 1891 and was added to the National Register in 1985.

It was built in 1891 by John Niemi and John Saari. One of the church's members painted "an unusual altar painting" during 1905–1907.

It was moved in 1963 across the street to its current location, the Sinking Gardens, an area of subsidence facing onto Lead's Main Street.
