= Viking Lutheran Church =

Historic church in North Dakota, United States

- U.S. National Register of Historic Places
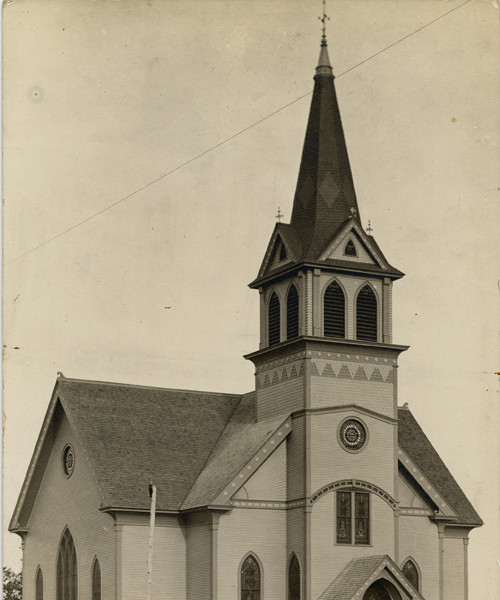
- Viking Lutheran Church, c. 1914

- Location within North Dakota Location within the United States
- Nearest city: 5161 31st St NE, Maddock, North Dakota
- Coordinates: 47.8610°N 99.4900°W
- Area: 2.5 acres (1.0 ha)
- Built: 1903
- Architectural style: Gothic
- NRHP reference No.: 79001768
- Added to NRHP: November 14, 1979

Viking Lutheran Church is located in South Viking Township in Benson County, and it is a historic wood-frame church in rural Maddock, North Dakota. The congregation was founded in 1887, and the church was built in 1903 with some Gothic elements. The church interior was originally painted with angels, stars, and other elaborate decorations within the sanctuary, but the paintings were covered during renovations. The church also features a unique stained glass window portraying Martin Luther on the North side of the church and Jesus holding a lamb on the South side, among many other elaborate stained glass windows.

The church was formally dedicated in 1909 when it hosted a regional synod.

A rose window blown out in a storm before 1927 was replaced by plain glass.

It was listed on the National Register of Historic Places in 1979.

The congregation is still active.

The address to Viking Lutheran Church is 5161 31st St NE; Maddock, North Dakota 58348.
