= East Highland Lutheran Church =

Historic church in South Dakota, United States

- U.S. National Register of Historic Places
- Location within South Dakota Location within the United States
- Nearest city: Brandt, South Dakota
- Coordinates: 44°40′29″N 96°31′31″W
- Area: 2.2 acres (0.89 ha)
- Built: 1915
- Architectural style: Late Gothic Revival
- NRHP reference No.: 00000120
- Added to NRHP: February 18, 2000

East Highland Lutheran Church is a historic church in rural Deuel County, South Dakota. The church is located approximately 6 miles (9.7 km) northeast of the community of Brandt. The church was built in Late Gothic Revival style in 1915. It was added to the National Register in 2000. The church is affiliated with the Evangelical Lutheran Church in America.
