= Jacob's Church =

Historic church in Ohio, United States

- U.S. National Register of Historic Places
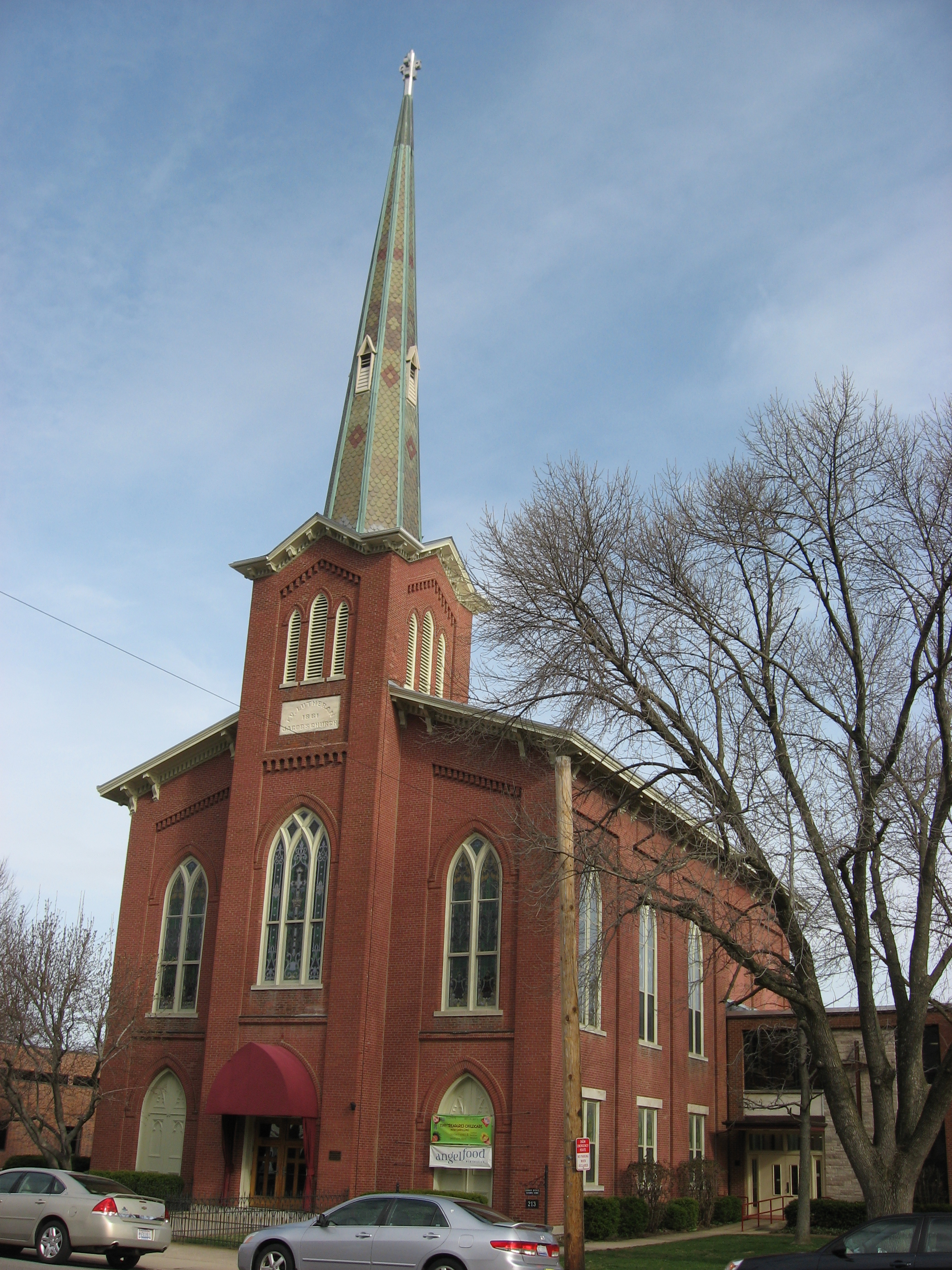

- Location within Ohio Location within the United States
- Location: 213 E. Central Ave., Miamisburg, Ohio
- Coordinates: 39°38′31″N 84°17′11″W
- Area: less than one acre
- Built: 1864
- Built by: Henry Groby, David Groby
- Architectural style: Gothic Revival
- MPS: Pennsylvania German Churches of Ohio MPS
- NRHP reference No.: 90001290
- Added to NRHP: September 6, 1990

Jacob's Church (St. Jacob's Evangelical Lutheran Church) is a historic Lutheran church at 213 East Central Avenue in Miamisburg, Ohio.

It was built in 1864 and added to the National Register in 1990. The builders were Henry & David Groby who were considered "one of the best builders in the area".
