= St. Paul's Lutheran Church (Ashland, Kentucky) =

Lutheran church in Ashland, Kentucky, U.S.

Coordinates: 38.4769°N 82.6446°W

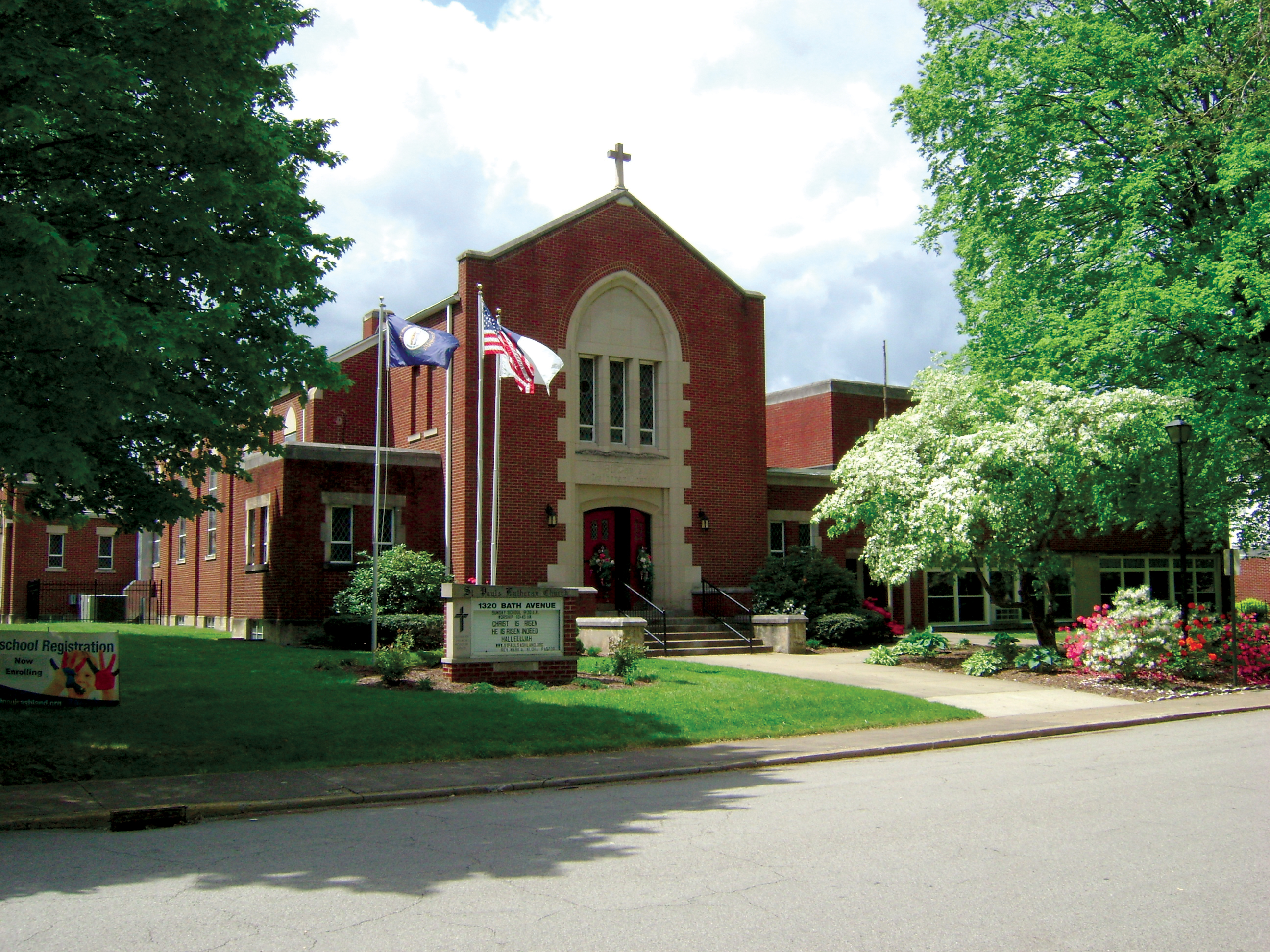
St. Paul's Lutheran Church (2010)

St. Paul's Lutheran Church is a church located in Ashland, Kentucky and is affiliated with the Lutheran Church - Missouri Synod.

== History ==
St. Paul's Lutheran Church began in 1866 by German immigrants. Its original location was on the corner of 14th Street and Winchester Avenue, and Rev. Gustav Baum served as the initial pastor through 1871. Church services were in German originally. The churches records from 1866 to 1892 were written in German, and have been translated into English.

A group of German immigrants who had been worshipping together took an offer by the Kentucky Iron, Coal, and Manufacturing Company to obtain a lot to build a church.

The church was relocated in 1951 to its current location on Bath Avenue. St. Paul's celebrated its 150th anniversary in 2016.
