= Hopeful Lutheran Church =

Historic church in Kentucky, United States

- U.S. National Register of Historic Places
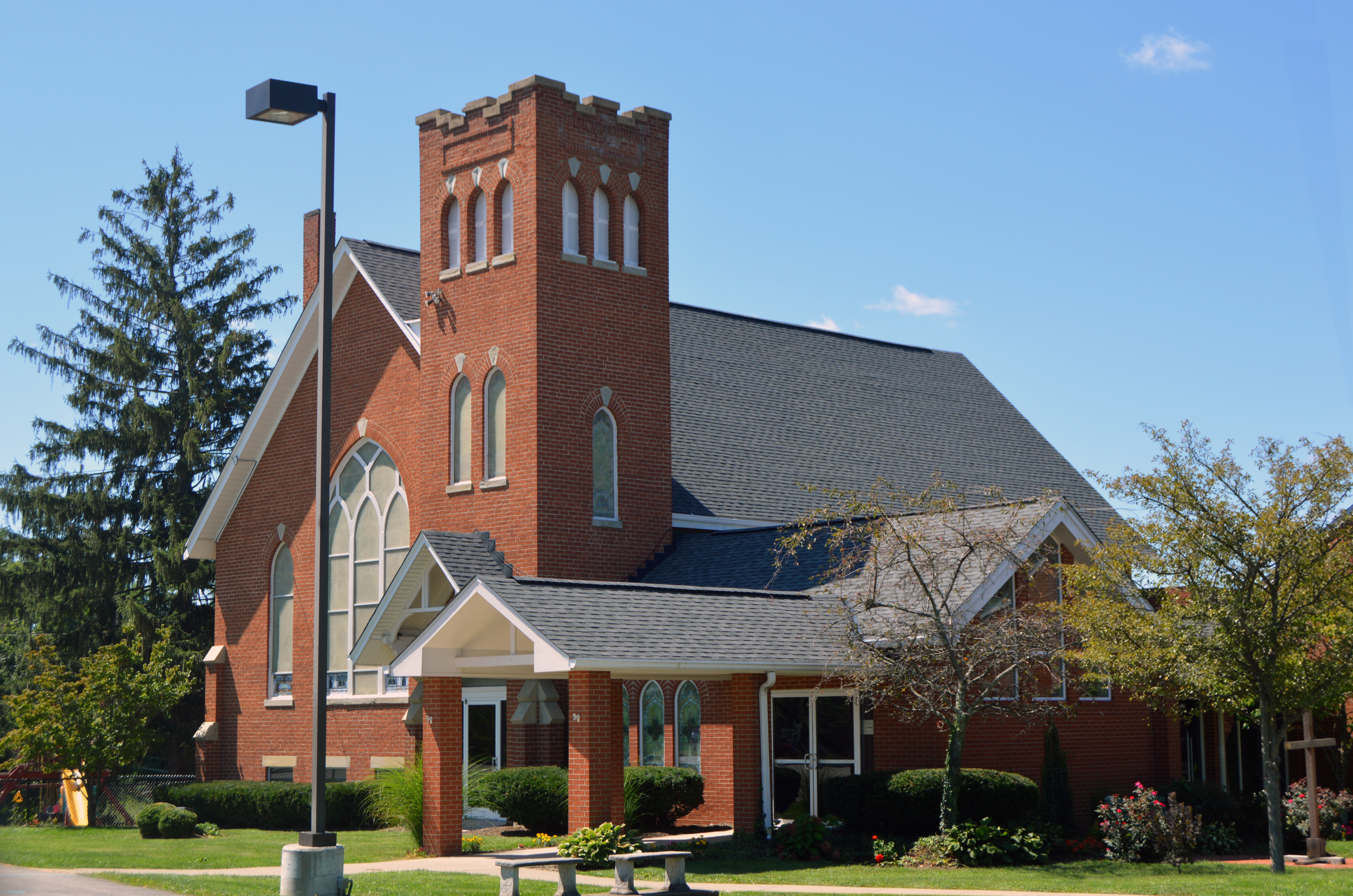
- Front and northern side

- Location within Kentucky Location within the United States
- Location: 6430 Hopeful Church Rd., Florence, Kentucky
- Coordinates: 38°59′58″N 84°39′33″W
- Area: 0.5 acres (0.20 ha)
- Built: 1917
- Architectural style: Late Gothic Revival
- MPS: Boone County MRA
- NRHP reference No.: 88003279
- Added to NRHP: February 6, 1989

Hopeful Lutheran Church was chartered on January 6, 1806. It was founded by a group of colonists from Virginia who settled in Boone County. In 1807, the first log church was built on an acre of donated land. Hopeful did not have a full-time pastor until October 1813 when Rev. William Carpenter (a Revolutionary War veteran) moved to Boone County to be the first pastor.

While fires destroyed the first three structures, the current church building was finished in 1917 in Florence, Kentucky. This is the fourth church structure on the site serving the same Lutheran congregation.

A group of 14 families associated with the Hebron Lutheran Church of Germanna, Madison Co. VA, settled in Boone County in 1805. Family names included Hoffman, Rouse, Tanner, Hanse, Carpenter, and Zimmermann. Their descendants are well represented in the current population of Boone County. Hopeful Lutheran Church was the first Lutheran church in the county and its first regular pastor, William Carpenter, moved to the area in 1813.
