= St. Lucas Evangelical German Lutheran Church and Cemetery =

Historic site in Monroe County, Wisconsin, US

- U.S. National Register of Historic Places
- The church in 2019

- Location within Wisconsin Location within the United States
- Location: 30013 Oxford Road in Monroe County, Wisconsin
- Coordinates: 43°44′40″N 90°21′09″W
- Built: 1899
- NRHP reference No.: 100004276
- Added to NRHP: August 14, 2019

St. Lucas Evangelical German Lutheran Church and Cemetery in rural Monroe County, Wisconsin is listed on the National Register of Historic Places. The Gothic Revival style frame church was built in 1899 in to serve as spiritual and social center of its German Lutheran community.
