= Ryssby Church =

- Swedish Evangelical Lutheran Church of Ryssby
- U.S. National Register of Historic Places
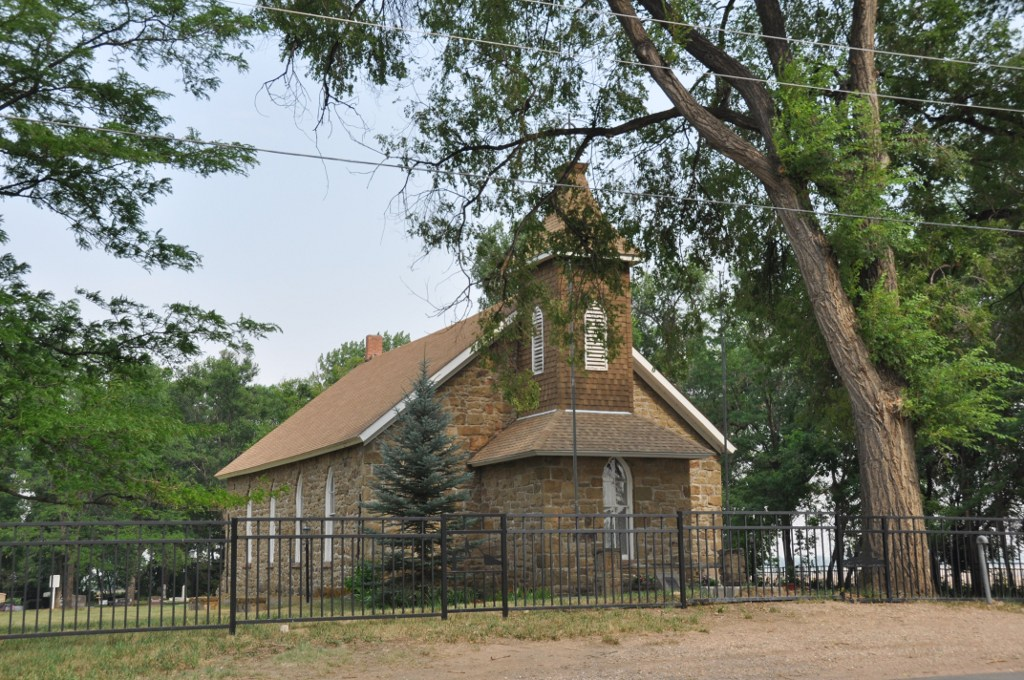
- Ryssby Church in 2012

- Location within Colorado
- Location: N. 63rd St. Boulder, Colorado
- Coordinates: 40°08′23″N 105°12′20″W
- Built: 1882
- NRHP reference No.: 84000797
- Added to NRHP: February 16, 1984

Ryssby Church is a church located outside of Longmont, Boulder County, Colorado. The church was built in 1882 by Swedish immigrants, although it fell into disuse between 1914 and 1924. A dedicated committee from the First Evangelical Lutheran Church, the descendant congregation of the Ryssby and Elim churches, maintains the church, organizes events, and funds continuous improvement projects. The church hosts weddings, church picnics, an annual Midsummer service, and Christmas candlelight services in early December.

== History ==
In 1862, Sven J. Johnson, an agent for the White Star Line, along with Bengt Johnson, Aaron Peterson, Sven Magni, Peter Johnson, Lars J. Johnson, and Samuel Gummeson, set off from their homeland in Ryssby, Sweden, to come to America seeking free land under the Homestead Act. In the first years, Sven's home, the only framed house, was the community centre and served as a church. In 1875, a school house was built and the services moved there.

In 1877, Rev. Frederick Lagerman came to the Ryssby settlement as a spiritual leader, and in 1878 he organized a congregation among the settlers, calling it the "Swedish Evangelical Lutheran Congregation of Ryssby, Boulder County Colorado." The new congregation was affiliated with the Augustana Synod. In February 1878, the congregation officially called Rev. Lagerman to be their pastor and in January 1881, the congregation accepted the offer from Hugo Anderson for 3 acres (12,000 m^{2}) of land on which to build the church. August Olander donated sandstone from his homestead to be used as building materials and by Oct. 31 of that year, the cornerstone of Ryssby church was laid.

The church was finished and ready for occupancy on Midsummer Day of 1882, and a dedication ceremony for both the church and adjoining cemetery were held. The settlers strove to fashion the new Ryssby church from the church they had left in Ryssby with a tall tower in the front and four-pointed windows along each side. The church was heated by a large stove, which still heats the church to this day. A white railing circled the front altar under the domed barrel roof.

In 1908, the Elim congregation of nearby Longmont invited the Ryssby congregation to merge with them but this did not officially happen until 1914. The Ryssby congregation ceased to exist and the little country church was left empty. A lightning storm damaged the tower and it appeared that the Ryssby church would be left to crumble. In 1924, Rev. Luther Stromquist of the Elim congregation organized a group to repair the church and to again hold an annual Midsummer service there. With their efforts, Ryssby was made a state historical site in June 1933 with an official marker laid. In 1938, the annual Christmas services were reinstated at the church which continues to this day. In the 1960s a group of descendants funded a full restoration project where the tower was replaced, renovation and painting of the interior, and new landscaping in the cemetery were carried out.

=== Today ===
Families continue to bury deceased family members in its consecrated ground and there is an annual church picnic and service on Midsummer Day in June . Christmas services are held on the second weekend of December. The church is decorated by youth from First Lutheran Church and is lit by hundreds of candles. Choirs from First Lutheran Church provide music and the birth story from the Gospel of Luke is read in Swedish. The church continues to be improved with Rusty Brockmann, of Iron Age Arts building a new footbridge with steel railings and a gate that connects the parking lot and church grounds over the Swede ditch. The Lutheran Seal is worked into the gate. A new fence near the road was also created by Iron Age Arts with detailed historical designs outlined on four panels.
