= Our Savior's Lutheran Church (Menno, South Dakota) =

Historic church in South Dakota, United States

- U.S. National Register of Historic Places
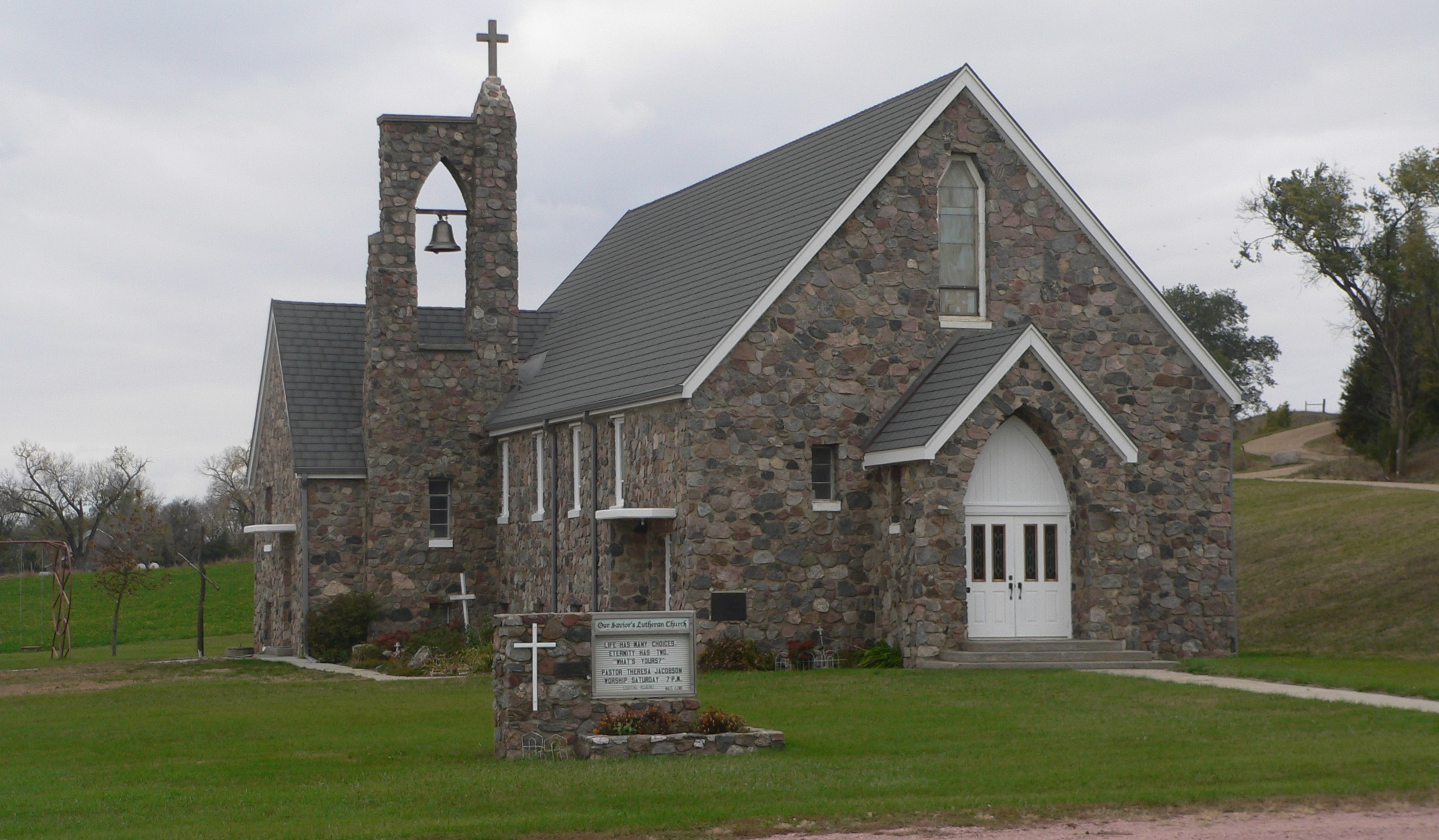

- Location within South Dakota Location within the United States
- Location: 29219 431st Ave, near Menno, South Dakota 57045
- Coordinates: 43.152156°N 97.579319°W
- Architect: Thorson, Thorwold
- Architectural style: Late Gothic Revival
- NRHP reference No.: 01001078
- Added to NRHP: October 7, 2001

Our Savior's Lutheran Church is a church near Menno, South Dakota. Built in 1935, it was added to the National Register of Historic Places in 2001.

It was deemed architecturally notable "as an excellent example of a second generation, vernacular Late Gothic Revival building".
