= St. Johannes Danske Lutherske Kirke =

Historic church in Nebraska, United States

- U.S. National Register of Historic Places
- U.S. Historic district
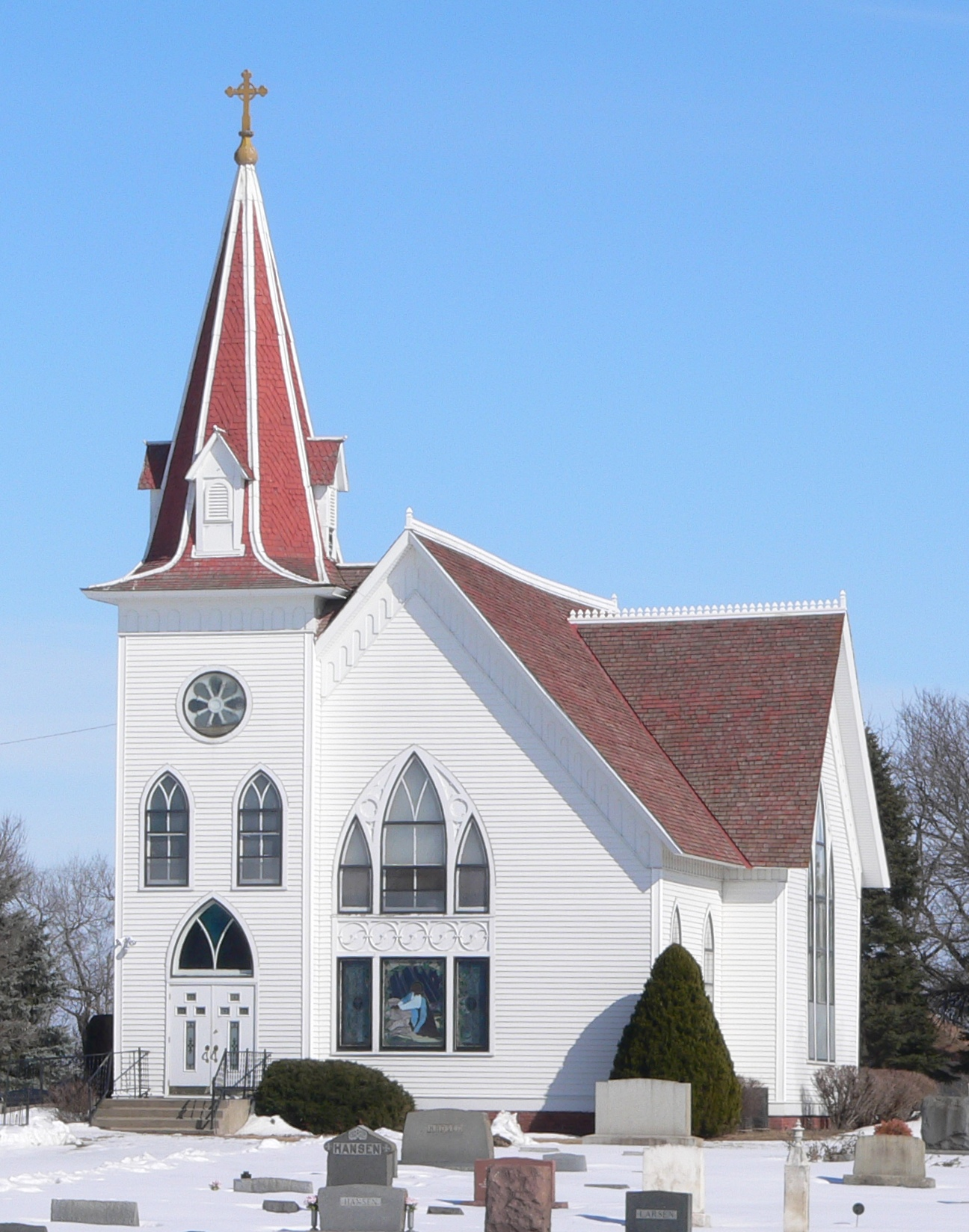

- Location within Nebraska Location within the United States
- Nearest city: Marquette, Nebraska
- Coordinates: 41°0′0″N 97°56′21″W
- Area: 3.6 acres (1.5 ha)
- Architect: Jensen, Carl; Almquist, O.
- Architectural style: Gothic
- NRHP reference No.: 92001570
- Added to NRHP: November 13, 1992

St. Johannes Danske Lutherske Kirke (St. John's Evangelical Lutheran Church) is a church in rural Hamilton County, Nebraska. The Church is located in the unincorporated settlement of Kronborg, about three miles east of Marquette, Nebraska. It was built in a Gothic style between 1899 and 1915. It was added to the National Register of Historic Places in 1992.
