= Stony Point Evangelical Lutheran Church =

Historic church in Kansas, United States

- U.S. National Register of Historic Places
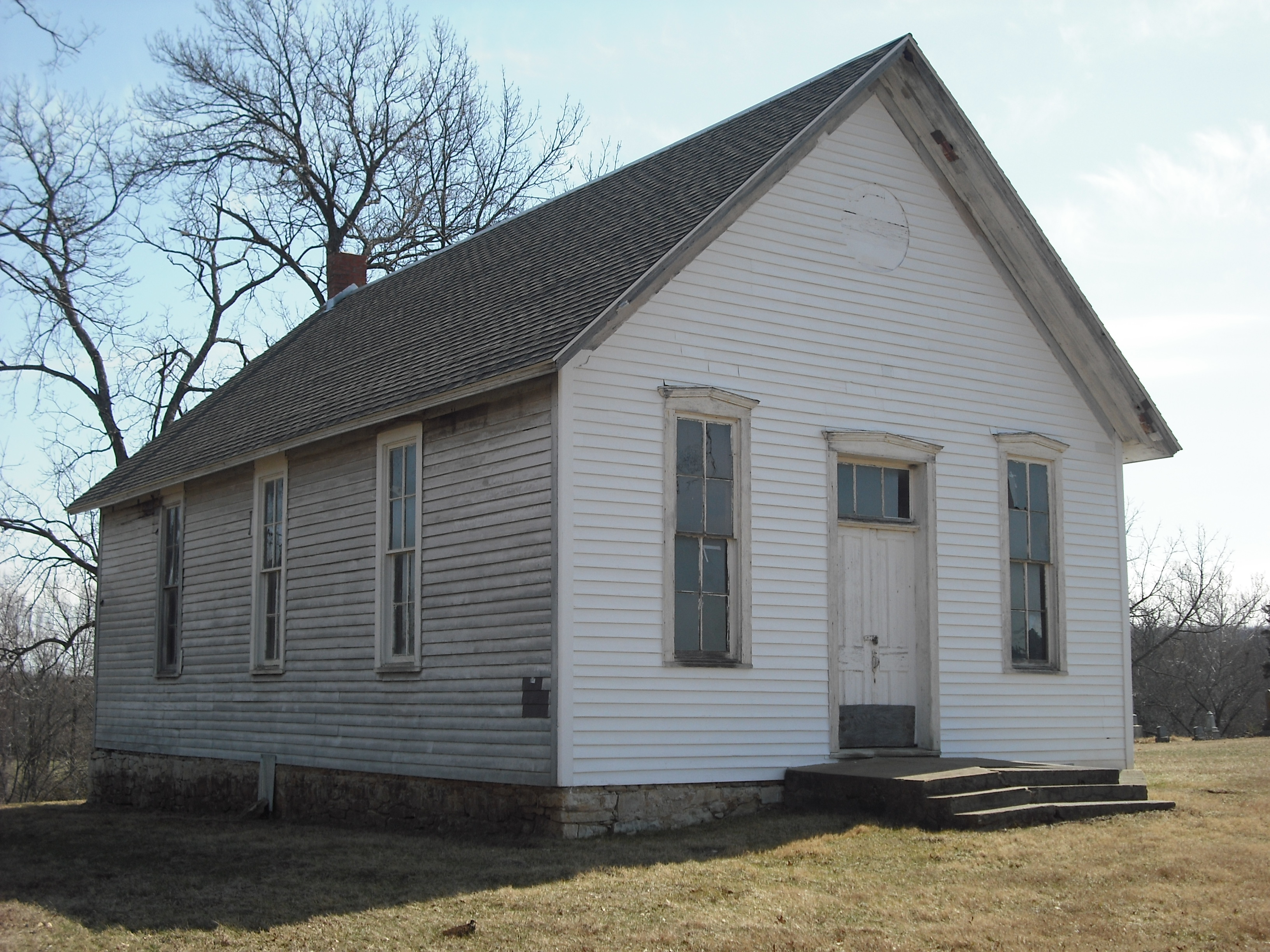
- Stony Point Evangelical Lutheran Church in 2009

- Location within Kansas Location within the United States
- Nearest city: Baldwin City, Kansas
- Coordinates: 38°49′30″N 95°12′38″W
- Area: Less than one acre
- Built: 1882–83
- Built by: Obediah, Henry; et al.
- NRHP reference No.: 06001168
- Added to NRHP: December 20, 2006

Stony Point Evangelical Lutheran Church is a historic church in Baldwin City, Kansas. It has also been known as Christ's Evangelical Lutheran Church. The church was built in 1882–83 and added to the National Register of Historic Places in 2006.

It is 24 by 42 feet (7.3 m × 12.8 m) in plan and has a gable roof. It rests on a native limestone foundation.
