= St. Andrews Evangelical German Lutheran Church =

Historic church in North Dakota, United States

- U.S. National Register of Historic Places
- U.S. Historic district
- Location within North Dakota Location within the United States
- Nearest city: Zeeland, North Dakota
- Coordinates: 46.11469°N 99.77395°W
- Area: 2 acres (0.81 ha)
- Built: 1893
- Architectural style: Colonial Revival
- NRHP reference No.: 90001027
- Added to NRHP: July 12, 1990

The St. Andrews Evangelical German Lutheran Church near Zeeland, North Dakota, United States, was built in 1893 by Germans from Russia. Also known as St. Andrews Lutheran Parish District, the historic area was listed on the National Register of Historic Places in 1990. The listing included four contributing buildings and one contributing site.

The district includes the original 1893 church, a 1906 church, a parsonage, and a cemetery.

One work includes Colonial Revival architecture.
