= Pilgrim Lutheran Church for the Deaf of Greater Kansas City and Parsonage =

Church for the deaf in Missouri, U.S.

- U.S. National Register of Historic Places
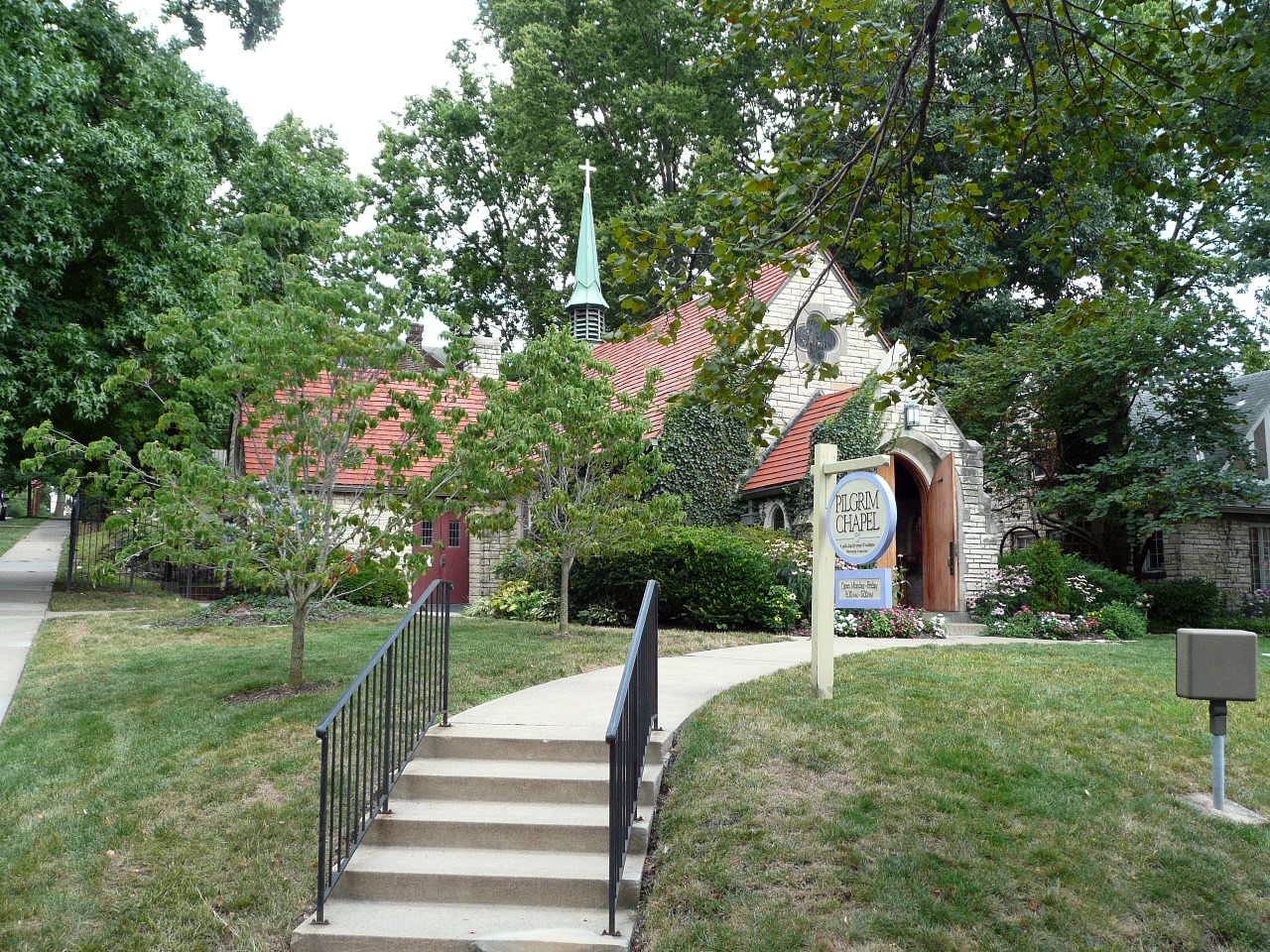
- Pilgrim Lutheran Church for the Deaf of Greater Kansas City and Parsonage, August 2015

- Location within Missouri Location within the United States
- Location: 3801-3807 Gilham Rd., Kansas City, Missouri
- Coordinates: 39°3′36″N 94°35′33″W
- Area: less than one acre
- Built: 1941
- Architect: Webber, F. R., with Clifton Ramsay; Duncan, Herbert
- Architectural style: Late Gothic Revival
- NRHP reference No.: 00000334
- Added to NRHP: January 25, 2001

Pilgrim Lutheran Church for the Deaf of Greater Kansas City and Parsonage is a historic site at 3801-3807 Gilham Road in Kansas City, Missouri.

It was built in 1941 and added to the National Register of Historic Places in 2001. At the time of its construction, Pilgrim Chapel was one of less than ten churches constructed nationwide by the Missouri Synod of the Lutheran Church specifically to serve the deaf community. The church designed by Frederick Roth Webber, addressed the special needs of the congregation by providing clear sight lines and appropriate lighting that enhanced visibility of the minister conducting services at the altar.

During the AIDS epidemic and the initial panic that accompanied it, Pilgrim Chapel performed memorial services for AIDS victims and their loved ones.
