= Deep River Pioneer Lutheran Church =

Historic church in Washington, United States

- U.S. National Register of Historic Places
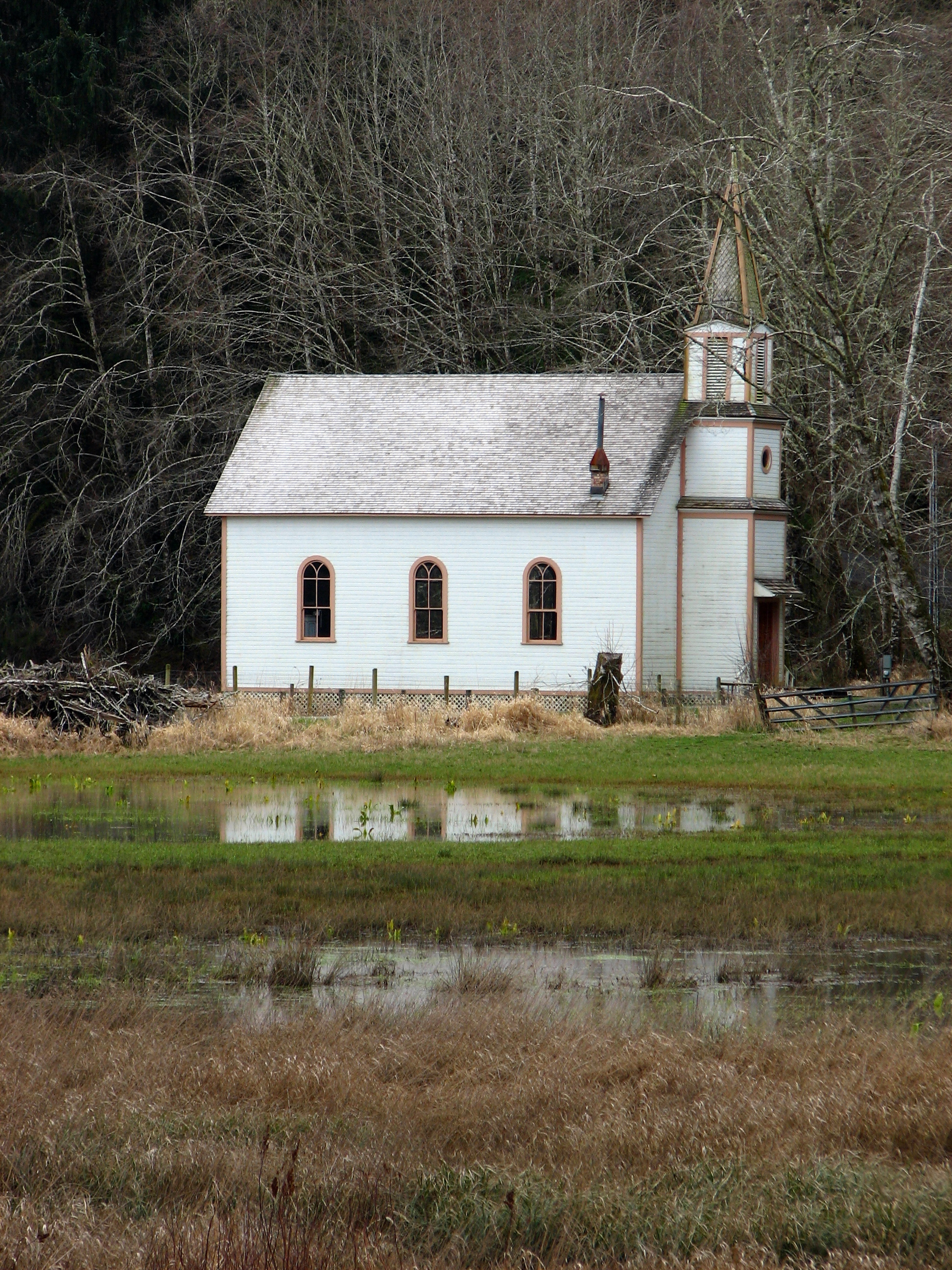

- Location within Washington (state) Location within the United States
- Nearest city: Deep River, Washington
- Coordinates: 46°21′35″N 123°40′55″W
- Area: Less than one acre
- Built: 1902
- Architectural style: Gothic Revival
- NRHP reference No.: 74001983
- Added to NRHP: August 7, 1974

Deep River Pioneer Lutheran Church is a historic Gothic Revival style church in Deep River, Washington. It was added to the National Register of Historic Places in 1974.

The church was the area's first organized Evangelical Lutheran Church. Construction by a community of Finnish settlers began in 1898 and was completed in 1902. The church became inactive in the 1930s following the decline of its congregation. Its interior has remained largely unchanged over time. A 2012 restoration of the church's exterior included repainting of the white siding and peach-colored trim after the removal of a large buildup of moss. The church is usually open for viewing during Naselle's Finnish-American Folk Festival.
