= Old Danish Church =

Historic church in Illinois, United States

- U.S. National Register of Historic Places
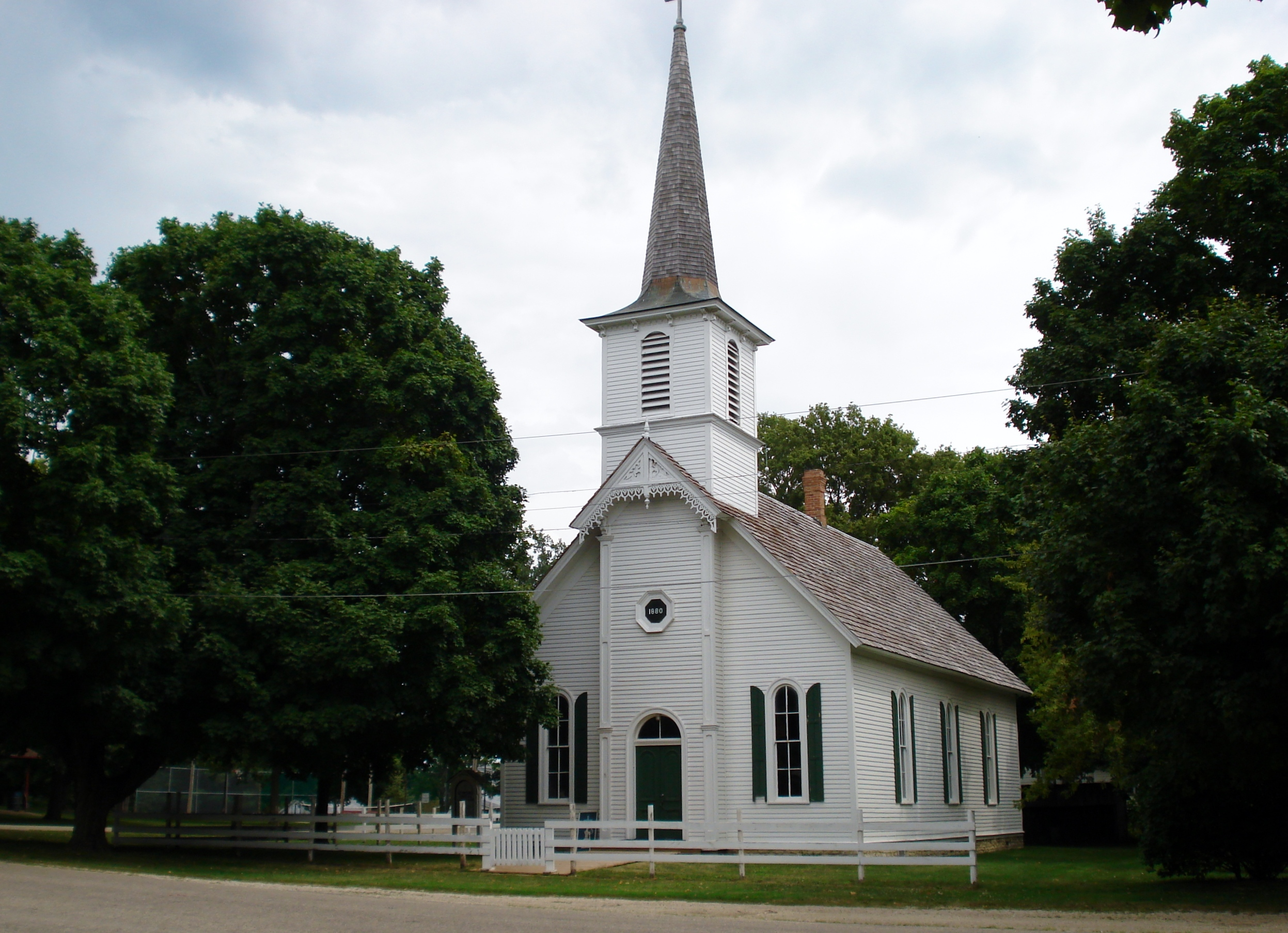

- Location within Illinois Location within the United States
- Location: SE corner of Cook and Washington Sts., Sheffield, Illinois
- Coordinates: 41°21′27″N 89°44′6″W
- Area: less than one acre
- Built: 1880
- NRHP reference No.: 73000691
- Added to NRHP: October 2, 1973

The Old Danish Church, also known as St. Peter's Danish Evangelical Lutheran Church, is a historic church located at the southeast corner of Cook and Washington Streets in Sheffield, Illinois. The church was built in 1880 to house a congregation formed in 1869, which was made up of immigrants from Lolland, Denmark who had begun to loosely organize two years prior. This congregation was the oldest in the Danish Evangelical Lutheran Church in America, which was not officially formed until 1874. The 1880 church is a Gothic Revival structure with a 75-foot (23 m) steeple; the steeple houses the original bell, which was added in 1885. The interior of the church features three frescoes on the ceiling and a painting of the crucifixion behind the altar; the altar, communion railing, and baptismal font are all original.

The church was added to the National Register of Historic Places on October 2, 1973.
