= Telemarken Lutheran Church =

Historic church in South Dakota, United States

- U.S. National Register of Historic Places
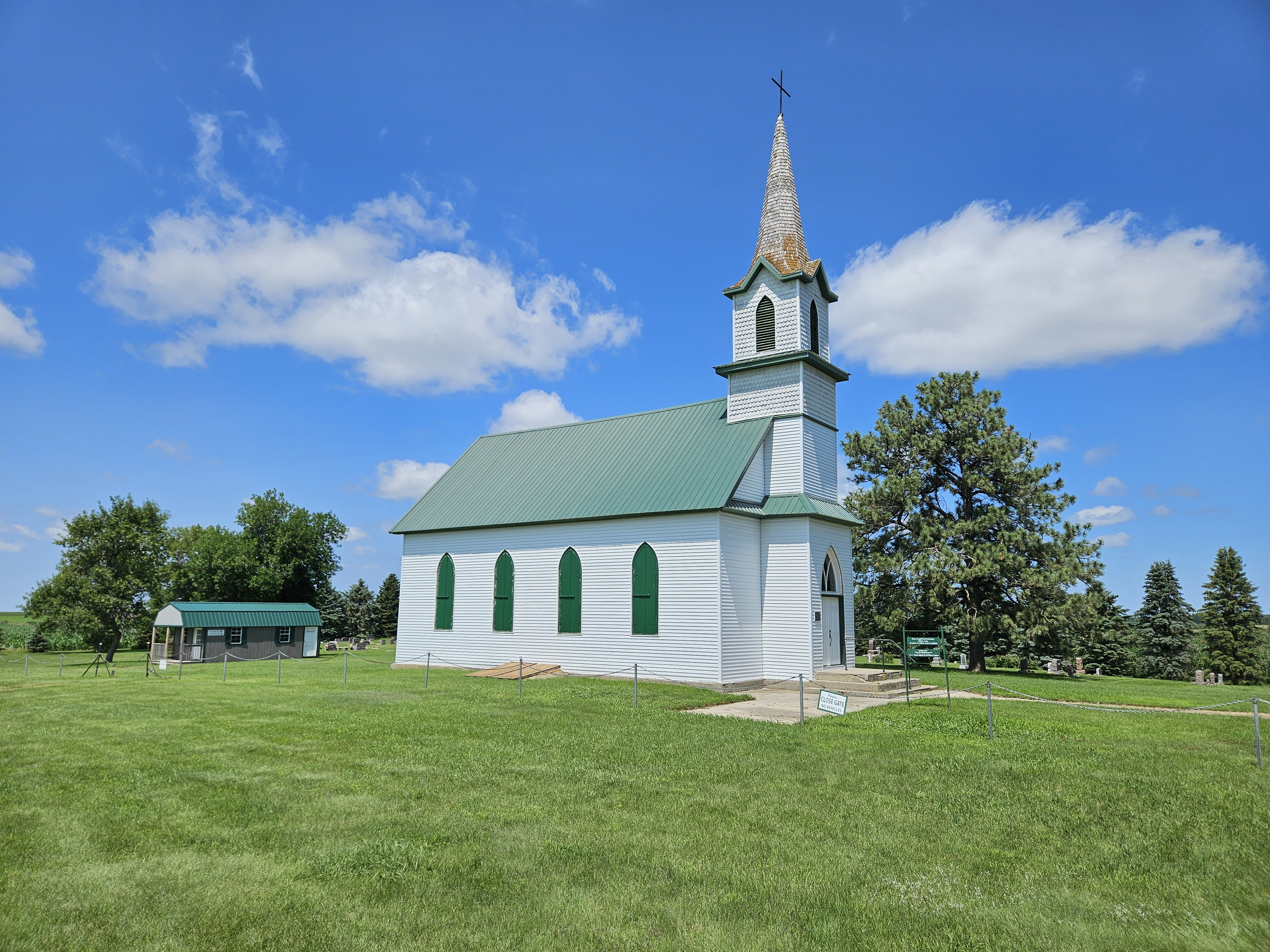

- Location within South Dakota Location within the United States
- Nearest city: Wallace, South Dakota
- Coordinates: 45°6′0″N 97°29′40″W
- Area: less than one acre
- Built: 1901
- Architect: Holvig, Edward E.; Markrud, Halvor
- Architectural style: Gothic Revival
- NRHP reference No.: 89001720
- Added to NRHP: October 19, 1989

Telemarken Lutheran Church is a historic church near Wallace, South Dakota. The church was added to the National Register in 1989.

Telemarken Church and Cemetery are situated northwest of Wallace in Clark County, South Dakota. The church is an example of the rural churches established by Norwegian immigrant homesteaders. It is a Gothic Revival structure. It was built in 1901 with a wood frame supported by a poured concrete foundation and is clad with clapboard siding. Adjacent to the church is a cemetery with gravestones dating back to 1892.
