= Pella Lutheran Church =

Church building in Nebraska, United States

Coordinates: 41°15′27″N 95°58′27″W

Pella Lutheran Church was located at 303 South 41st Street between Farnam and Harney Streets in midtown Omaha, Nebraska, between Nebraska Medical Center and Mutual of Omaha's Midtown Crossing. Pella was affiliated with the Evangelical Lutheran Church in America. The church closed in 2014. It has been renovated and reopened as a wedding and event venue.
