= Good Hope Lutheran Church =

Historic church in South Dakota, United States

- U.S. National Register of Historic Places
- Location within South Dakota Location within the United States
- Nearest city: Vienna, South Dakota
- Coordinates: 44°44′49″N 97°38′13″W
- Area: 2.5 acres (1.0 ha)
- Built: 1894
- Architect: Rose, John; MacAlpine, William
- Architectural style: Gothic Revival
- NRHP reference No.: 02000727
- Added to NRHP: July 11, 2002

Good Hope Lutheran Church is a historic church in Clark County, South Dakota. It is situated on U.S. Route 1 near the community of Vienna, South Dakota. The Gothic Revival style church was built in 1894 and was added to the National Register in 2002.
