= Town Clock Church (Cumberland, Maryland) =

Historic church in Maryland, United States

- U.S. National Register of Historic Places
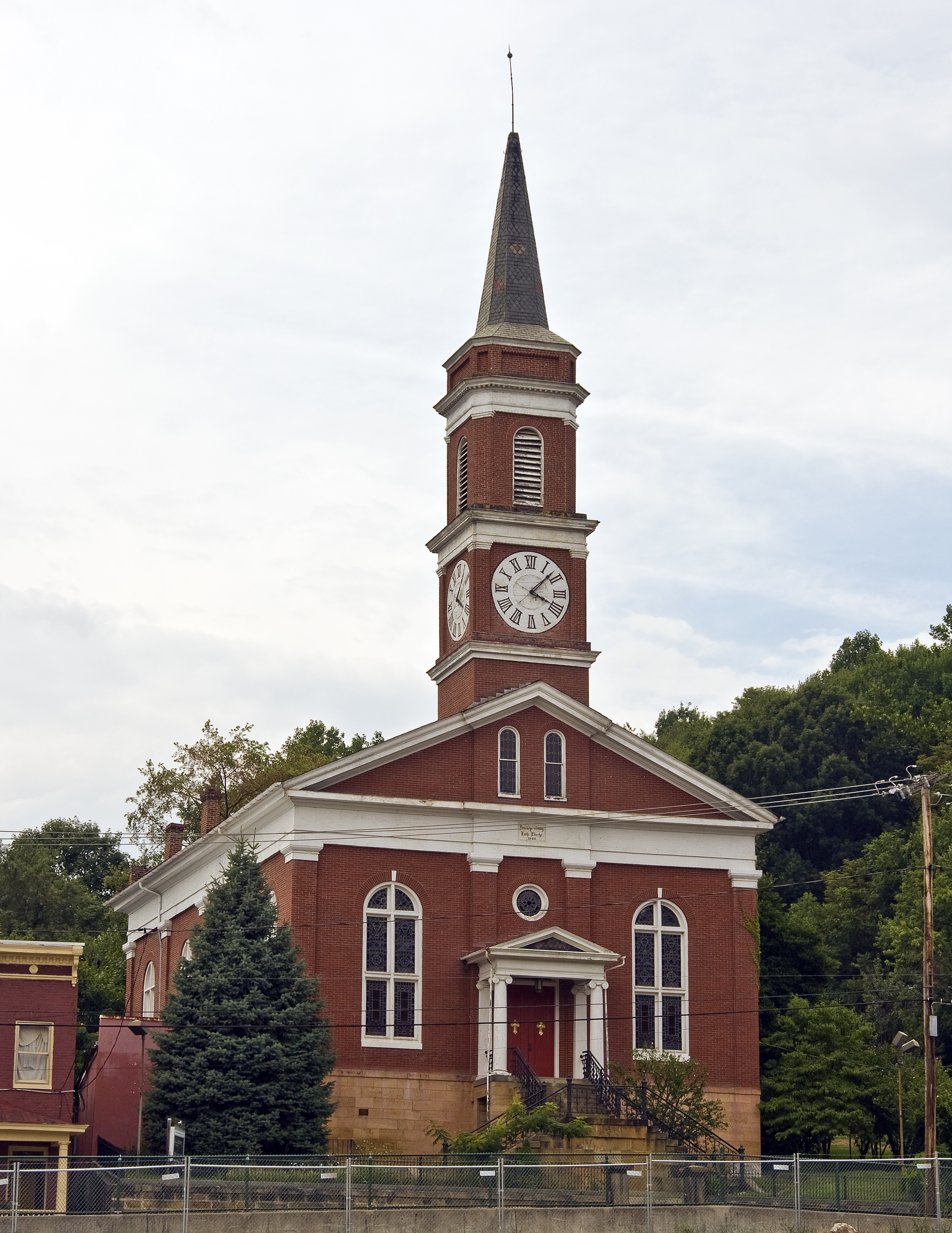

- Location within Maryland Location within the United States
- Location: 312 Bedford St., Cumberland, Maryland
- Coordinates: 39°39′25.2″N 78°45′39″W
- Area: less than one acre
- Built: 1848
- NRHP reference No.: 79001107
- Added to NRHP: August 6, 1979

Town Clock Church is a historic church in Cumberland, Allegany County, Maryland, United States. It is a one-story gable-front brick building built in 1848 by its German Lutheran congregation. A tall clock tower rises from the slate roof above the principal facade.

The Cumberland Town Clock Church was listed on the National Register of Historic Places in 1979.

The facility is the home of First Christian Church (Disciples of Christ) of Cumberland, Maryland.
