= St. John's Lutheran Church (Ellettsville, Indiana) =

Historic church in Indiana, United States

- Formerly listed on the U.S. National Register of Historic Places
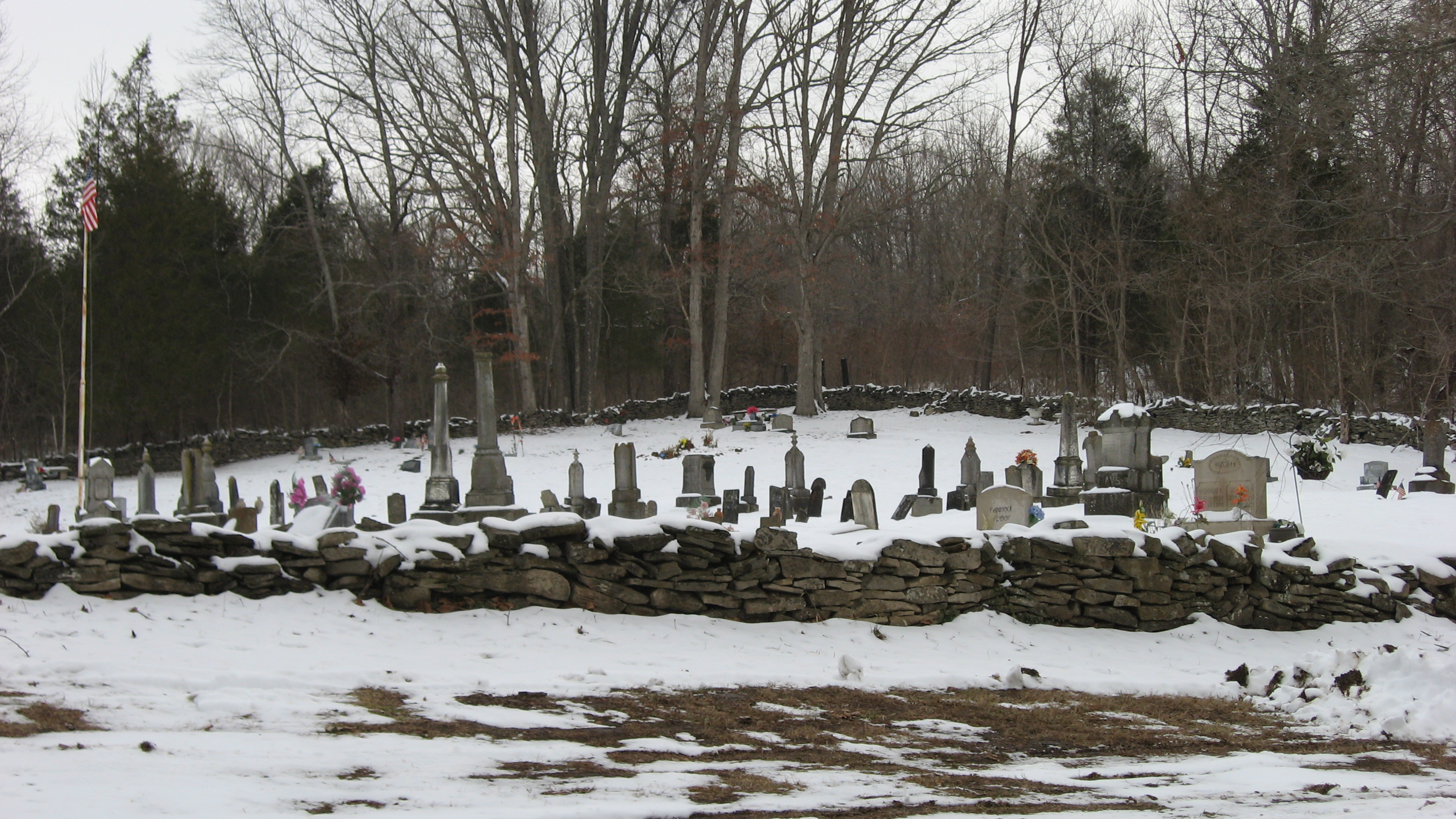
- St. John's Lutheran Cemetery, January 2011
- Nearest city: Ellettsville, Indiana
- Coordinates: 39°16′05″N 86°37′44″W
- Area: 1 acre (0.40 ha)
- Built: 1836
- NRHP reference No.: 82000024

Significant dates
- Added to NRHP: June 29, 1982
- Removed from NRHP: July 9, 1991

St. John's Lutheran Church, also known as the Old Dutch Church, was a historic Lutheran church located near Ellettsville, Indiana. It was a one-story, log building sheathed in yellow poplar siding. It has been demolished. The church's cemetery is still present near the former site of the building.

It was listed on the National Register of Historic Places in 1982 and removed in 1991.
