= Zion Evangelical Lutheran Church (Petoskey, Michigan) =

Historic church in Michigan, United States

- U.S. National Register of Historic Places
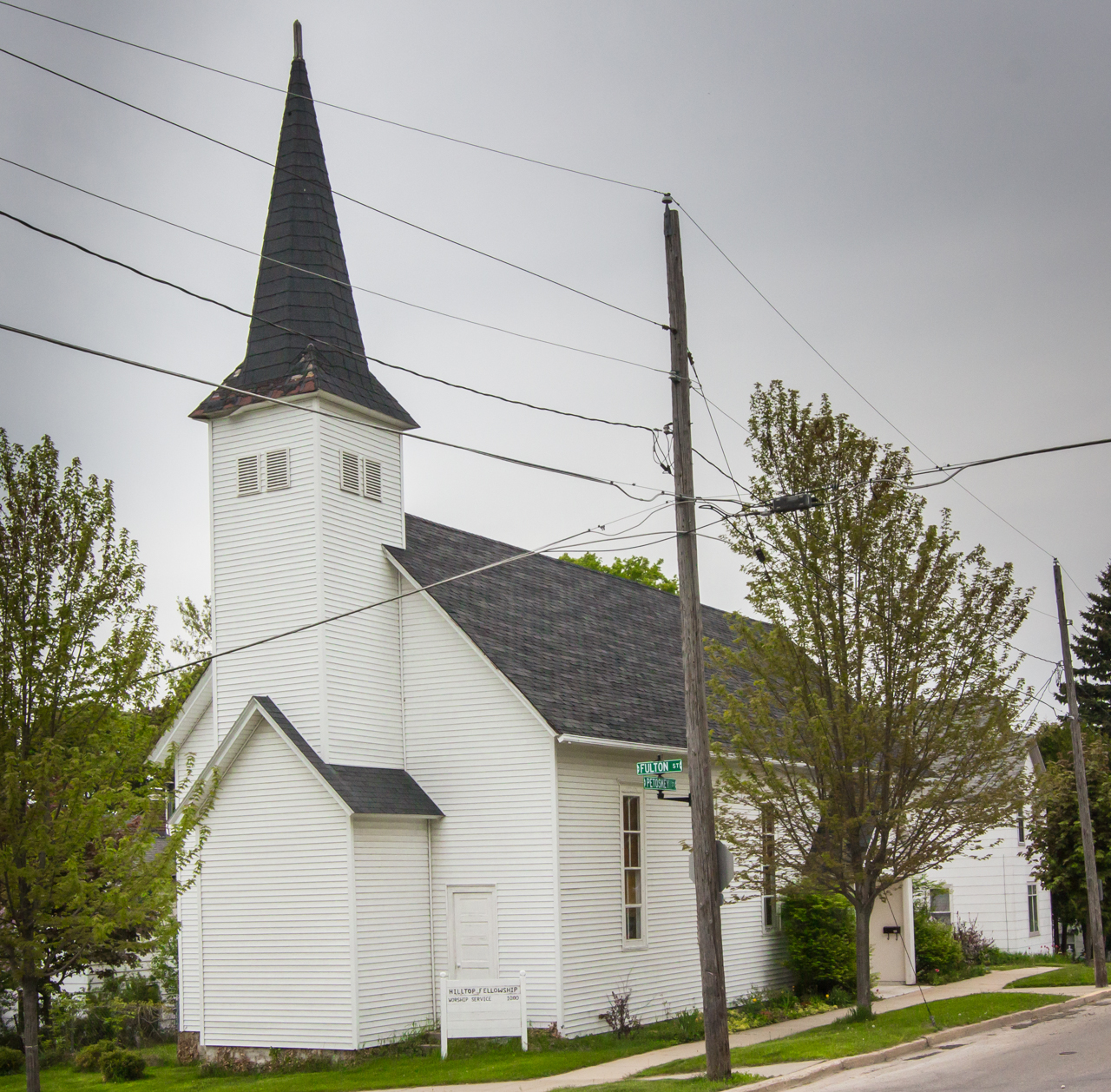

- Location within Michigan Location within the United States
- Interactive map
- Location: 810 Petoskey St., Petoskey, Michigan
- Coordinates: 45°22′11″N 84°57′27″W
- Area: 0.3 acres (0.12 ha)
- Built: 1892
- Architectural style: Late Victorian
- MPS: Petoskey MRA
- NRHP reference No.: 86002086
- Added to NRHP: September 10, 1986

Zion Evangelical Lutheran Church (now known as the Chapel of Our Guardian Angels) is a historic church located at 810 Petoskey Street in Petoskey, Michigan. It added to the National Register of Historic Places in 1986.

== History ==
The Zion Evangelical Lutheran Church was erected 1892 for the Zion Evangelical Church congregation. The congregation used the church until 1949, when they moved to a new church structure located on US Highway 131. In 1951, the Petoskey Mennonite Church purchased the building; the congregation later changed its name to the Hilltop Mennonite Fellowship. The Mennonite congregation used the building until 2015, when the congregation closed. The building was then purchased by Colleen and Michael Pattullo and now operates as the non-profit Chapel of Our Guardian Angels. The Unitarian Universalist Congregation of Petoskey rented space there for its meetings from 2016 to 2020.

== Description ==
The Zion Evangelical Lutheran Church is a one-story Late Victorian frame structure with some Gothic Revival elements. The building has a front gable roof and a rectangular tower with a peaked polygonal cap. It has eight-pane rectangular windows with corniced heads set in to the side walls. A gabled entryway addition is at the rear of one side wall.
