= Gran Evangelical Lutheran Church =

Historic church in Minnesota, United States

- U.S. National Register of Historic Places
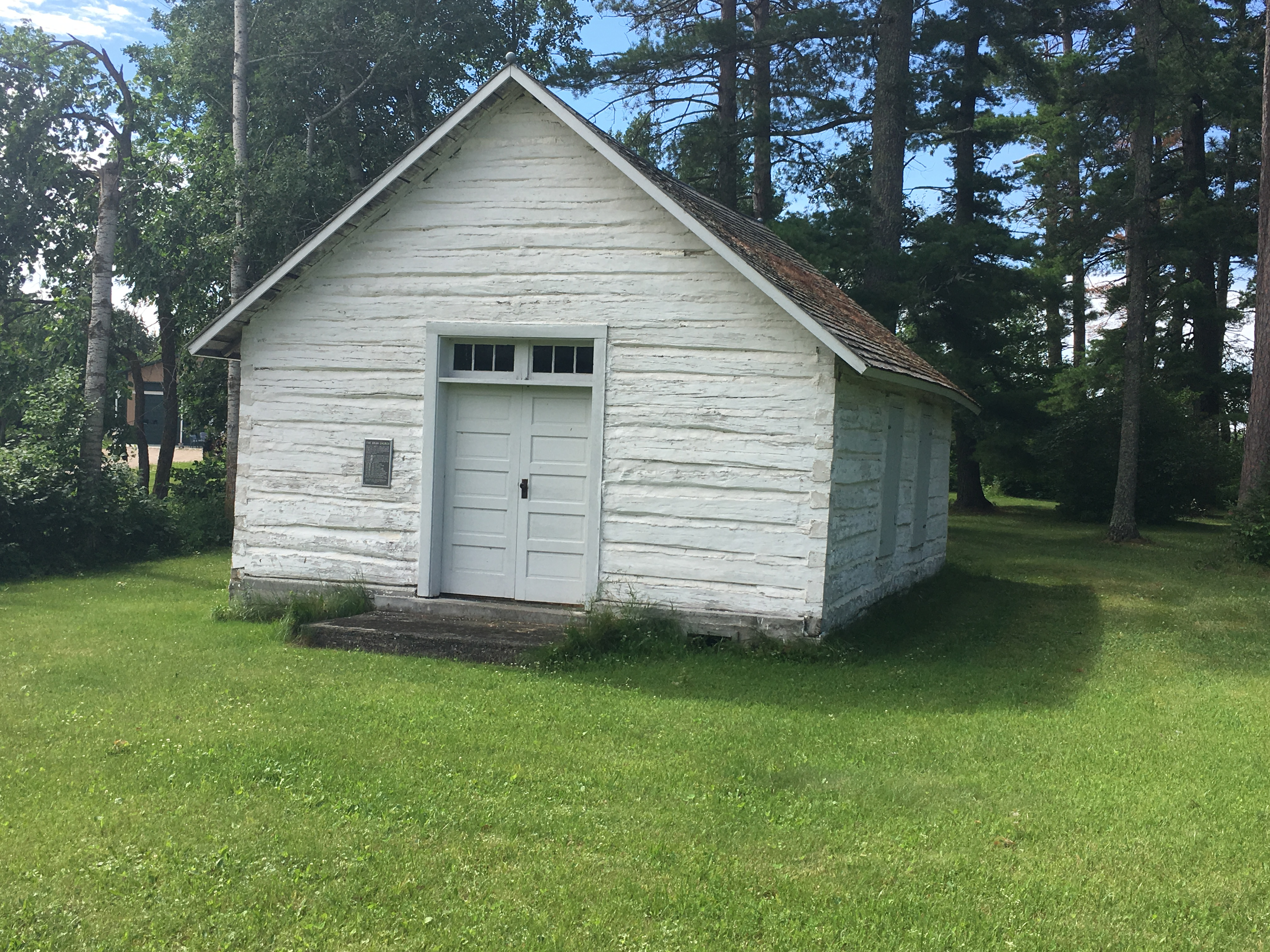

- Location within Minnesota Location within the United States
- Nearest city: Bagley, Minnesota
- Coordinates: 47°32′36″N 95°29′5″W
- Area: 1.5 acres (0.61 ha)
- Built: 1897
- Built by: Ole Eneberg
- Architectural style: Log cabin
- NRHP reference No.: 88000593
- Added to NRHP: May 19, 1988

Gran Evangelical Lutheran Church is a historic church in Popple Township, Clearwater County, Minnesota. Gran Church in Clearwater County is situated near the junction of Clearwater County Road 45 and 20 outside Bagley, Minnesota.

The log constructed church was built in 1897 by Ole Eneberg, during a time when that portion of Minnesota was just starting to be settled. Lumber companies were moving into north-central Minnesota to harvest the pine forests there, and homesteaders were following the loggers and establishing farms there. A group of Norwegian immigrants started the area's first church congregation. They hired Reverend G.P. Nesseth (1867-1937) who was doing missionary work in the area after being educated at Luther College in Decorah, Iowa. Reverend Nesseth and his congregation were members of the Synod of the Norwegian Evangelical Lutheran Church in America. Church services were held in the homes of church members for the first two years until the congregation built this structure between April and July 1897.

The congregation continued to worship in the log building until 1953, when they merged with another local congregation and established Our Savior's Lutheran Church in Ebro, Minnesota. In 1973, the Clearwater County Historical Society placed a plaque on the building recognizing it as "the first church built in Clearwater County". It was listed on the National Register of Historic Places in 1988.
