= Swedish Evangelical Lutheran Salem Church =

Historic church in Nebraska, United States

- U.S. National Register of Historic Places
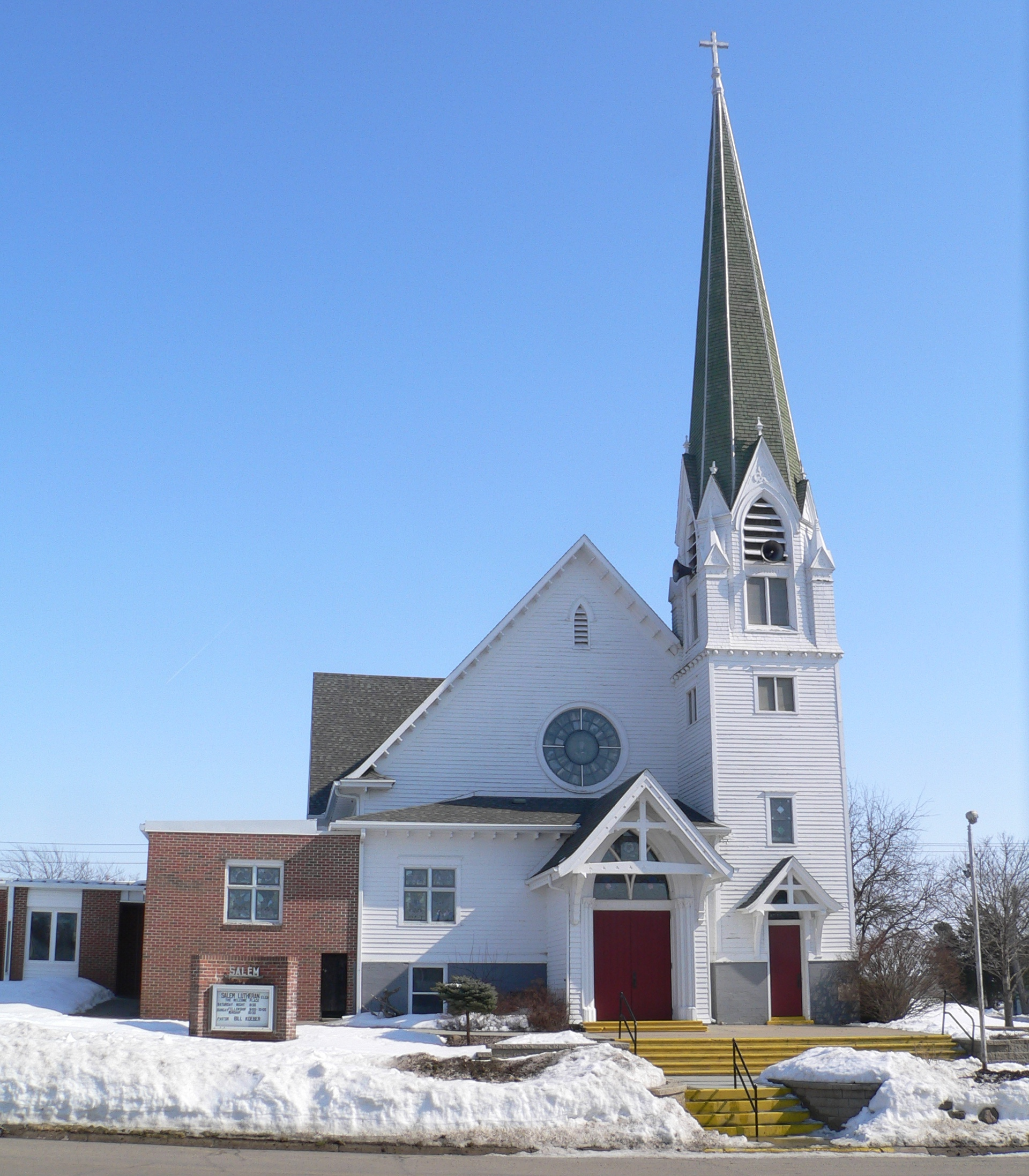

- Location within Nebraska Location within the United States
- Location: 411 Winter Street, Wakefield, Nebraska
- Coordinates: 42.267312°N 96.863166°W
- Built: 1905-1906
- Architect: Olof Z. Cervin
- Architectural style: Late Gothic Revival
- NRHP reference No.: 83001088
- Added to NRHP: February 1, 1983

The Swedish Evangelical Lutheran Salem Church, also known as Salem Church, in Wakefield, Nebraska, was built during 1905-1906 and was added to the National Register in 1983. It is a Late Gothic Revival-style church located off Nebraska Highway 35.

The church is 40 by 80 feet (12 m × 24 m) in plan and its steeple is 100-foot (30 m) tall.
