= Bethsaida Swedish Evangelical Lutheran Church Parsonage =

Historic church building in Washington, US

- U.S. National Register of Historic Places
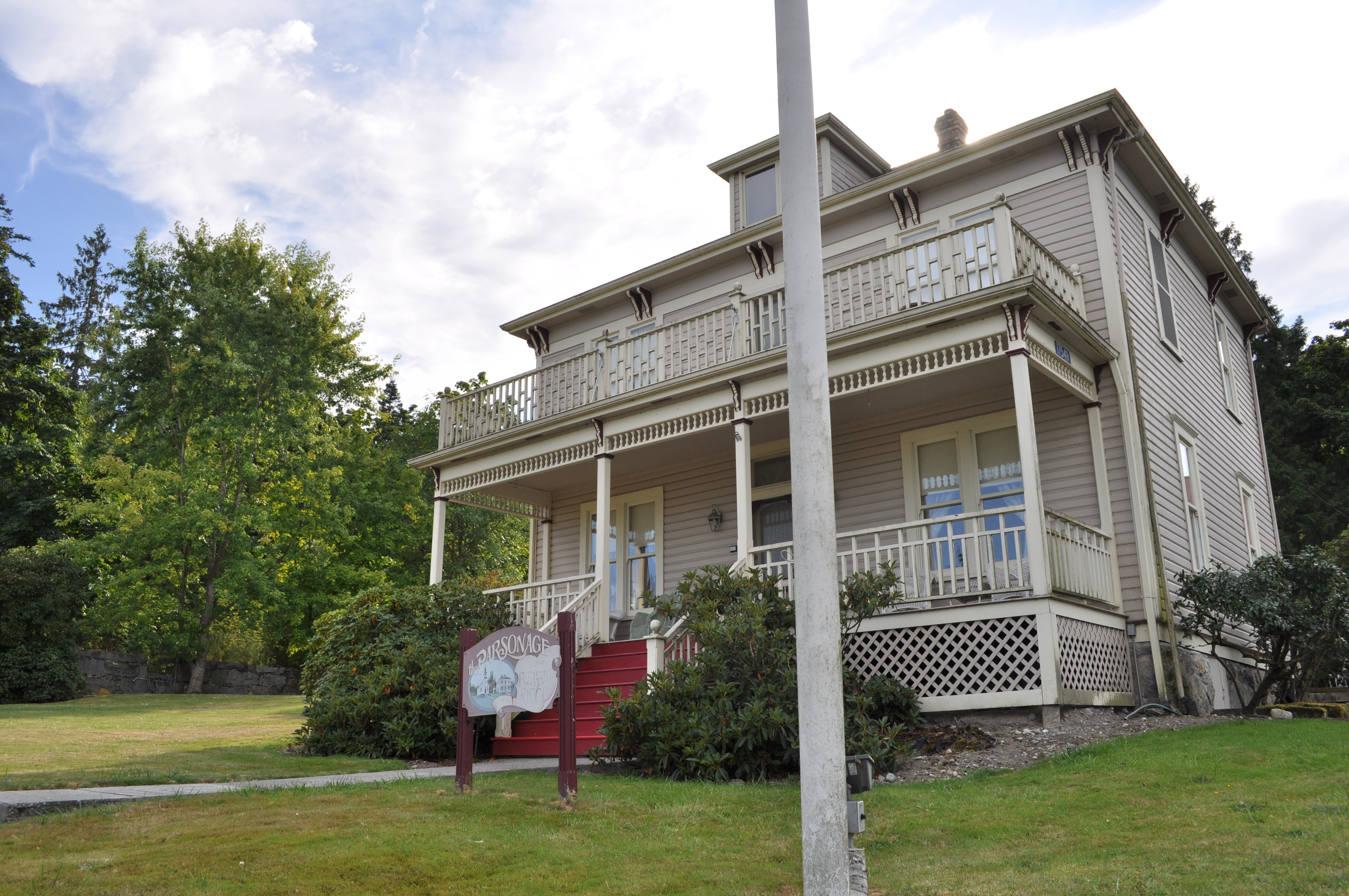

- Location within Washington (state) Location within the United States
- Nearest city: La Conner, Washington
- Coordinates: 48°23′29″N 122°26′32″W
- Area: less than one acre
- Architectural style: Vernacular Late Victorian
- NRHP reference No.: 90001863
- Added to NRHP: December 6, 1990

Bethsaida Swedish Evangelical Lutheran Church Parsonage is a historic church parsonage in La Conner, Washington. Bethsaida Swedish Evangelical Lutheran Church was built in 1890. The parsonage building which was located next to the church, was built in Vernacular Late Victorian style. The parsonage was added to the National Register in 1990.
