= National Register of Historic Places listings in Perry County, Missouri =

Location of Perry County in Missouri

This is a list of the National Register of Historic Places listings in Perry County, Missouri.

This is intended to be a complete list of the properties and districts on the National Register of Historic Places in Perry County, Missouri, United States. Latitude and longitude coordinates are provided for many National Register properties and districts; these locations may be seen together in a map.

There are 10 properties and districts listed on the National Register in the county.

This National Park Service list is complete through NPS recent listings posted April 11, 2025.

== Current listings ==
	Name on the Register	Image	Date listed	Location	City or town	Description
1	Christian A. Bergt Farm	Christian A. Bergt Farm	January 10, 1980 (#80002387)	East of Frohna; 37°38′43″N 89°36′52″W	Frohna	
2	Concordia Log Cabin College	Concordia Log Cabin College	November 21, 1978 (#78001671)	Main St. 37°37′50″N 89°35′10″W	Altenburg	
3	Doerr-Brown House	Doerr-Brown House	November 14, 1980 (#80002388)	17 E. St. Joseph St. 37°43′26″N 89°51′40″W	Perryville	
4	Eggers and Company General Store	Eggers and Company General Store	June 21, 2007 (#07000570)	19 County Road 32B; 37°42′09″N 89°41′18″W	Farrar	
5	Faherty House		April 17, 2025 (#100011396)	11 South Spring Street; 37°43′28″N 89°51′40″W	Perryville	
6	Mack's Chapel Cemetery		January 29, 2018 (#100002037)	1.25 mi. E of jct. Hwy. D & Cty. Rd. 439; 37°42′10″N 89°35′58″W	Altenburg vicinity	
7	Perry County Courthouse	Perry County Courthouse	May 23, 2016 (#16000286)	15 W. Sainte Marie St. 37°43′52″N 89°51′07″W	Perryville	
8	St. Mary's of the Barrens Historic District	St. Mary's of the Barrens Historic District	August 25, 1995 (#95001041)	Southwest of the junction of W. Saint Joseph St. and Missouri Route 51; 37°43′34″N 89°53′14″W	Perryville	
9	Shelby-Nicholson-Schindler House	Shelby-Nicholson-Schindler House	July 24, 1974 (#74001088)	701 W. St. Joseph St. 37°43′30″N 89°52′15″W	Perryville	
10	Tower Rock	Tower Rock	February 26, 1970 (#70000344)	1 mile south of Wittenberg in the Mississippi River; 37°37′54″N 89°30′53″W	Wittenberg	

== See also ==
- List of National Historic Landmarks in Missouri
- National Register of Historic Places listings in Missouri
