= St. Rose of Lima Mission, Roman Catholic Church (Silver Lake, Missouri) =

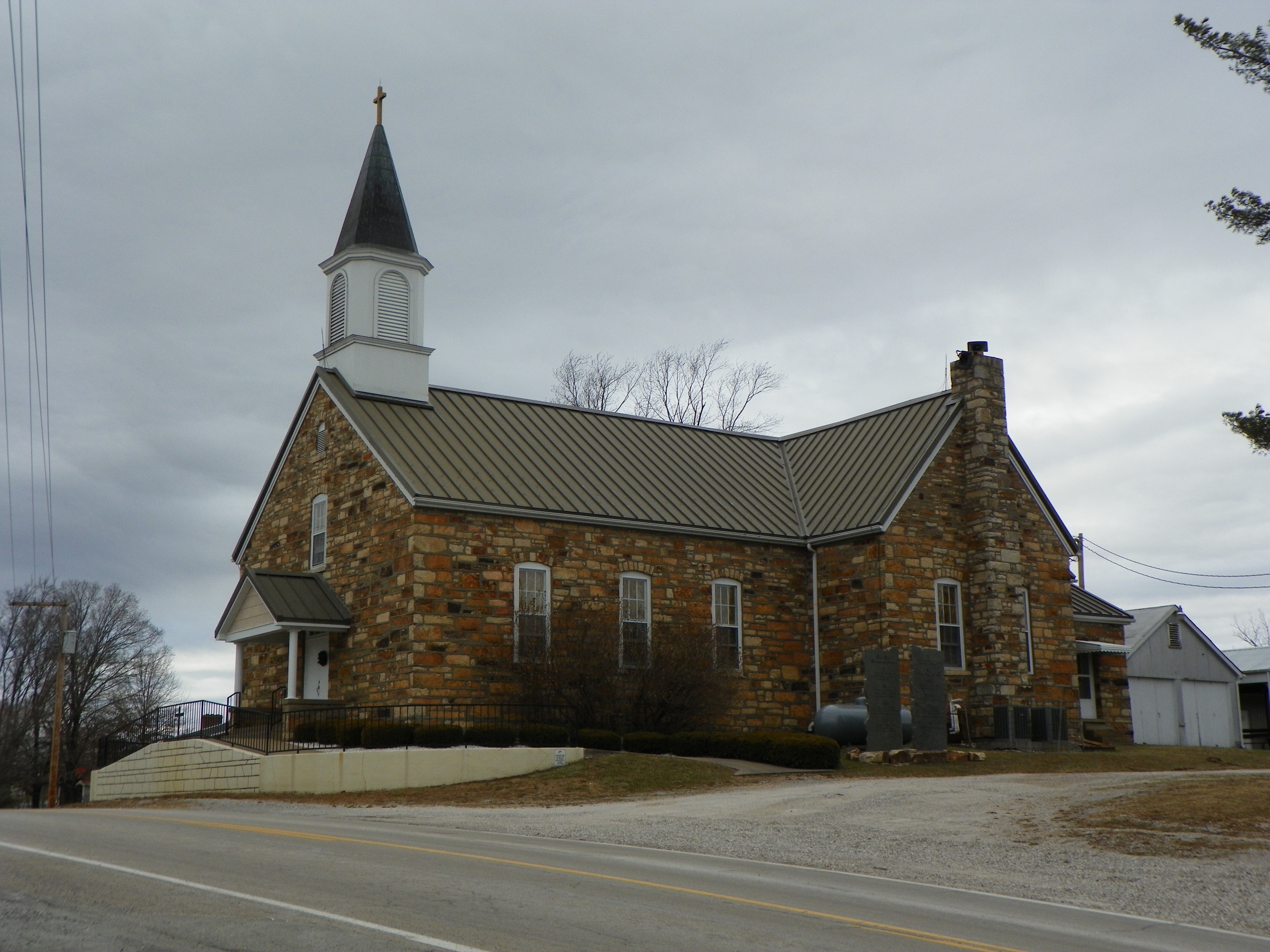

- Location within Missouri
- 37°41′01″N 89°59′24″W
- Location: 13370 Hwy 32, Silver Lake, Missouri
- Country: United States
- Denomination: Catholic Church

History
- Former name: Holy Innocents
- Founded: 1850s
- Consecrated: 1879

Architecture
- Groundbreaking: 1877
- Completed: 1879

Administration
- Archdiocese: Archdiocese of St. Louis
- Deanery: Ste. Genevieve

St. Rose of Lima Mission is a Roman Catholic church in Silver Lake, Missouri, in the deanery of Ste. Genevieve of the Archdiocese of St. Louis. It is administered by the Vincentians as a mission of St. Vincent de Paul Church in Perryville; as with the churches of St. James and St. Joseph, there are no weekend Masses offered.

== History ==
The parish first started as a log cabin mission church which was served by the Vincentians from Perryville in the 1850s. The first frame church was built under Father William Vincent Moore in 1865. Father Moore, who studied at St. Mary's of the Barrens Seminary, would later serve as priest at St. Rose of Lima Mission church. In the early 1870s, Father Joseph Hellwing, who had just become pastor of St. Mary's at Biehle, also gave services here.

The current stone church was constructed under the direction of Father Denis D. Leyden in 1877-79. The stone church was constructed of unique colored stone blocks, and was originally dedicated to the Holy Innocents. The brothers and students at St. Mary's of the barrens donated 30,000 shingles for the roof of the new church.

The Silver Lake church was changed to St. Rose of Lima, in 1885-1886, under Father Pommer and Father E. J. Wynne, apparently as a response to the completion of the new stone church.

== Gallery ==
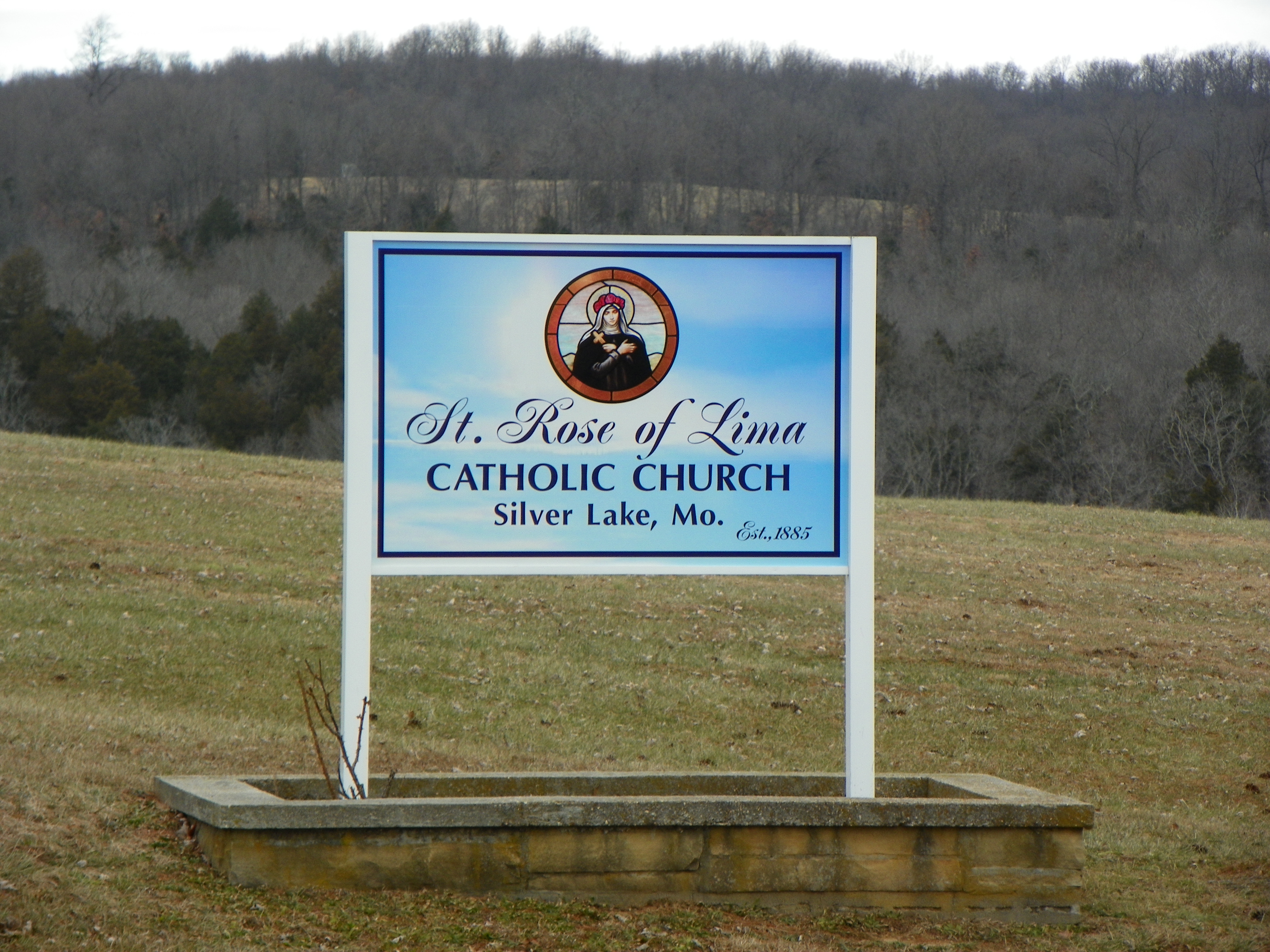
Church sign
