= Immanuel Lutheran Church (Perryville, Missouri) =

Immanuel Lutheran Church, Perryville, Missouri
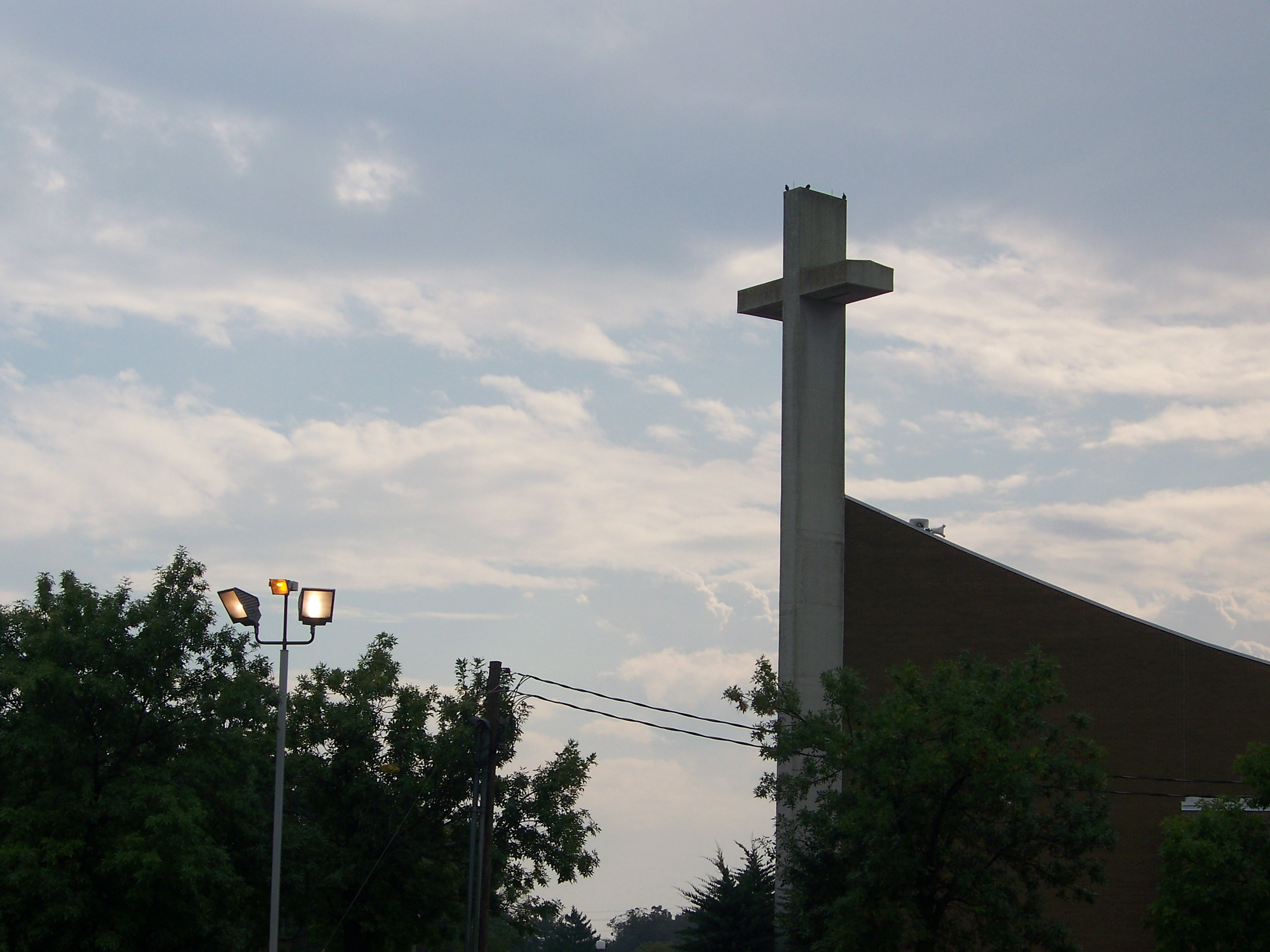
- Immanuel Lutheran Church

- Location within Missouri
- 37°43′10.19″N 89°48′36.72″W
- Location: 453 N West St, Perryville, Missouri 63775
- Country: United States
- Denomination: Lutheran Church – Missouri Synod
- Website: www.ilsperryville.org

History
- Former name: Immanuel Evangelical Lutheran Church
- Founded: 1867

Administration
- District: Missouri District

Immanuel Lutheran Church was founded in 1867 in Perryville, Missouri. It is a member of the Lutheran Church – Missouri Synod (LCMS).

== Name ==
The original name, Immanuel Evangelical Lutheran Church of Perryville, followed the German tradition of using the word “Evangelical”, meaning ‘Protestant’, as part of the name.

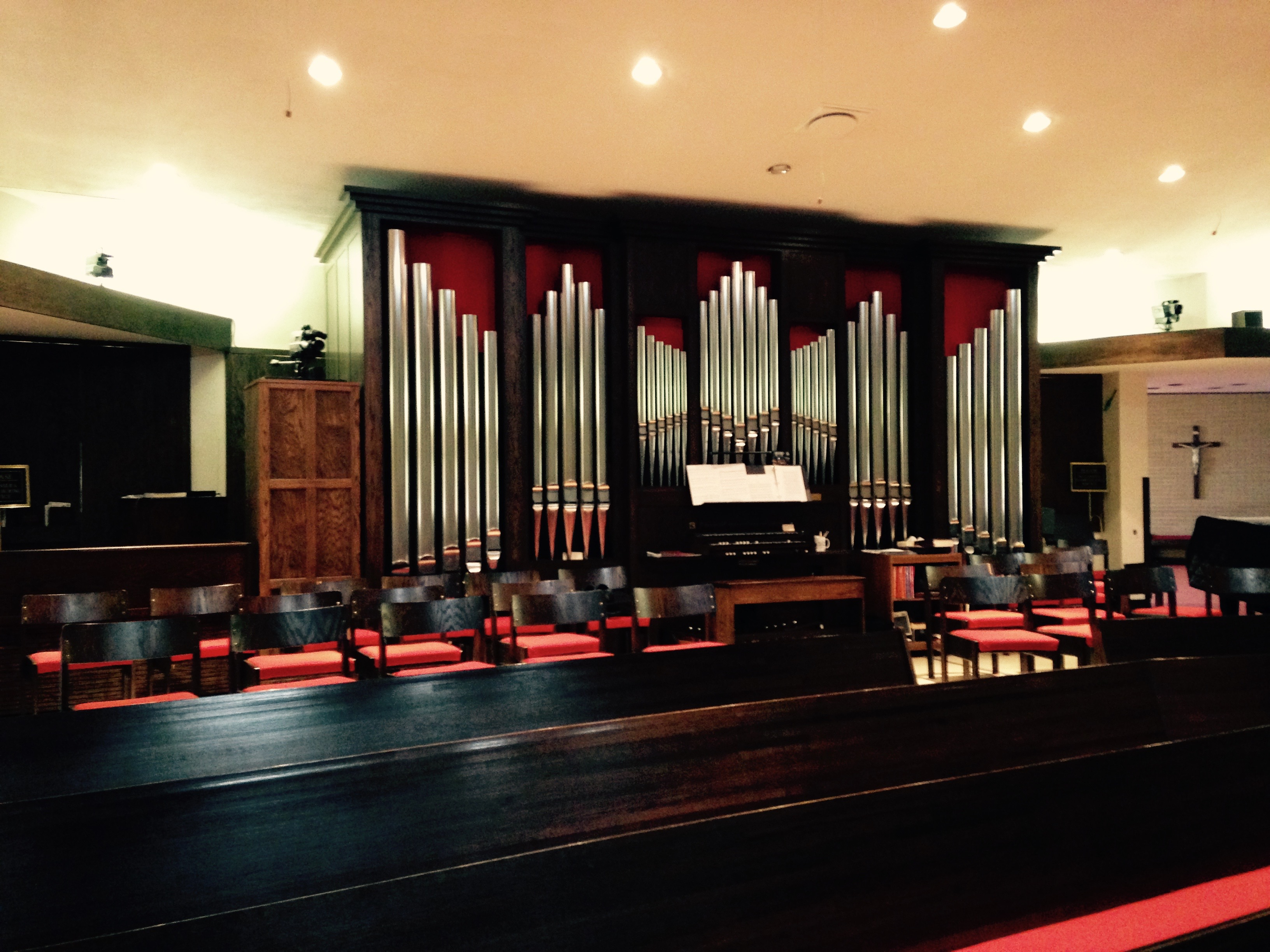
Immanuel Lutheran Church, Perryville, Missouri, German organ

== History ==
Immanuel Lutheran Church in Perryville was founded by Bavarian Lutherans who settled Perry County in 1839. These Bavarian Lutherans did not come in one large colony as the Saxon Lutherans had, but instead settled one or several families at a time. The first Lutheran Bavarian settler, George Bergmann, also known as “Creek Georg”, settled along the Cinque Homme Creek just a little to the north of Highway 61. In 1840, Pastor Gruber of Uniontown ministered to these Bavarian Lutherans and helped them establish the Peace Lutheran Church parish in Friedenberg in 1844. The first Friedenberg church stood to the north of the Cingue Homme bridge on Highway 61. In 1851, a new church was built on the Frankenberg, south of the Friedenberg cemetery.

A number of Lutheran Bavarians settled to the north of Perryville, but belonged to the Friedenberg church. By 1862, the Lutheran Bavarians were meeting in the Sandler House in Perryville for their Sunday services rather than making the trip to Friedenberg. In March 1866, a number of them formed a Schul-Gemeinde (a congregation for the purpose of setting up a school) for providing a Christian education in both German and English to their children. They also requested to be relinquished from the Friedenberg congregation for the purpose of stablishing their own congregation. At first, divine services and meetings were held in the Perry County Court House and in the old Methodist church to the north of the Monitor Building. In 1867, the first building was built, which served as both church and school. Pastor Friedrich Besel of the Friedenberg congregation provided pastoral services until the congregation could find its own pastor. In 1869, the Evangelical Lutheran Synod of Missouri, Ohio, and other States assigned Charles H. Demetrio to serve the congregation in Perryville. In 1894, a new church was erected, with the old church serving as the parochial school. English services were introduced in 1921, and by 1963 services were being held only in English.

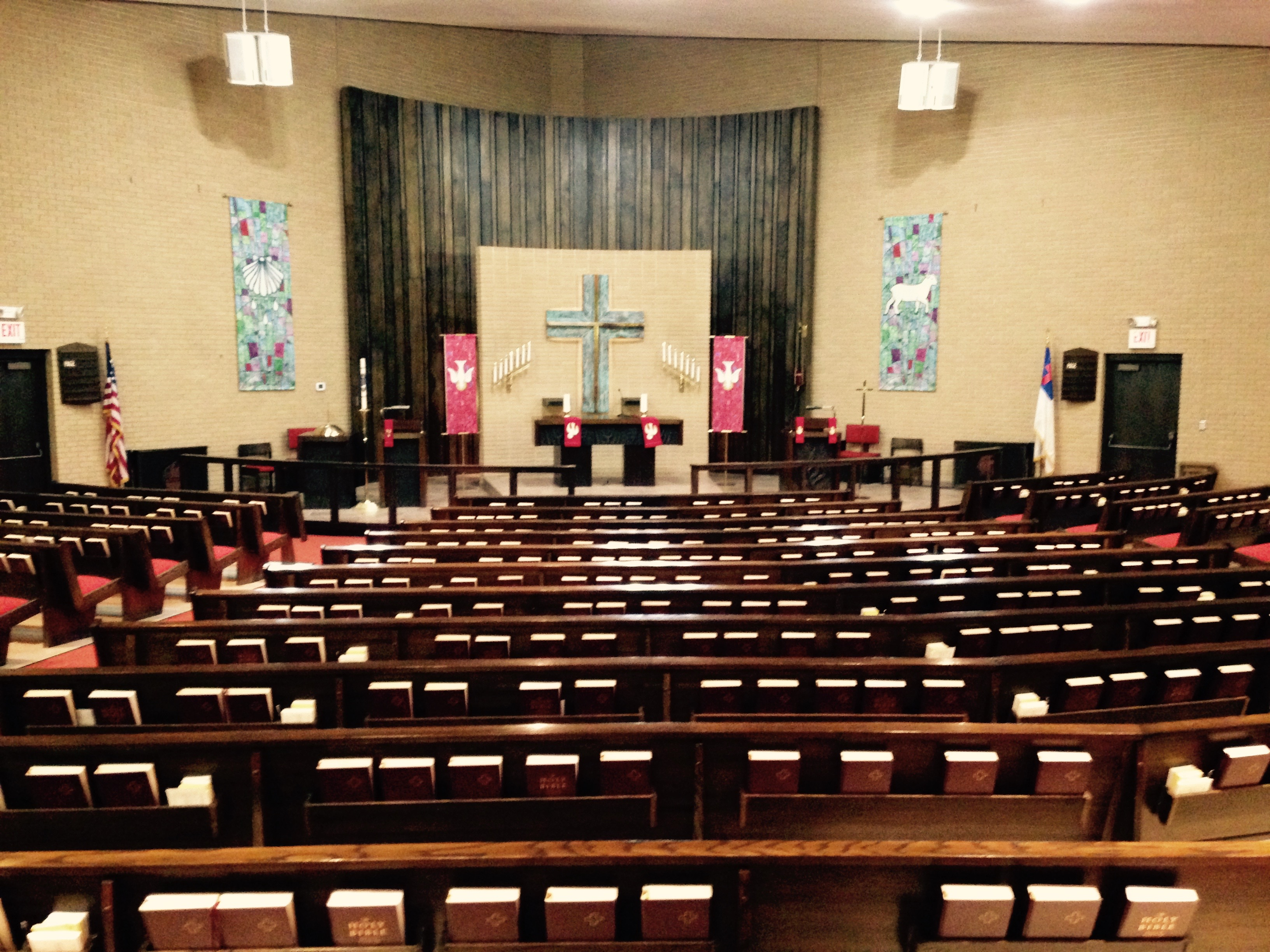
Interior with altar

== School ==
Immanuel Lutheran Church operates a Lutheran parochial school, Immanuel Lutheran School. The school instructs students from pre-Kindergarten through 8th grade.
