= Silver Lake, Missouri =

Unincorporated community in Missouri, U.S.

- unincorporated community
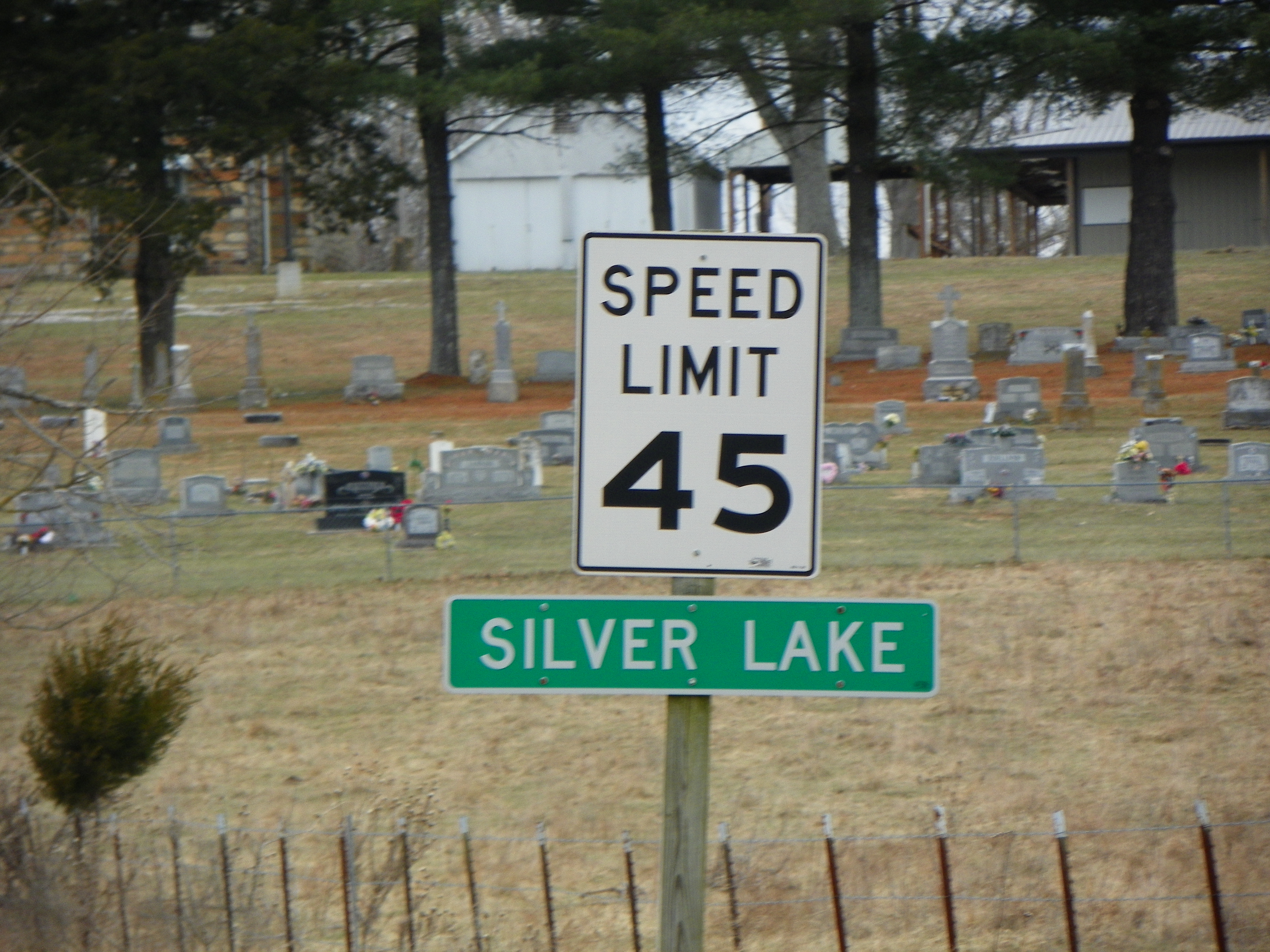

- Location of Perry County, Missouri
- Coordinates: 37°41′01″N 89°59′24″W
- Country: United States
- State: Missouri
- County: Perry
- Township: St. Mary's
- Elevation: 568 ft (173 m)
- Time zone: UTC-6 (Central (CST))
  - Summer (DST): UTC-5 (CDT)
- ZIP code: 63775
- Area code: 573
- FIPS code: 29-67934
- GNIS feature ID: 726452

Silver Lake is an unincorporated settlement in Saint Mary's Township in Perry County, Missouri, United States.

== Etymology ==
Silver Lake was named after the nearby lake of the same name, so named for its clear water, although there is another legend that an attempt was made to locate a silver mine near the lake. The post office name was written Silver Lake (1876–1895; Silverlake 1896–1910; and Silver Lake since 1910). The change was doubtless suggested by postal authorities, who prefer single names, but custom triumphed over law and the two words are used.

== History ==
Lead was mined in the location of Silver Lake in 1883 and some silver was found, though not in paying quantities. A post office was established in 1876.

The town of Silver Lake was laid out by Simon DuVall (1782–1865) on land that was granted to him in 1856.

The local Catholic parish church is the St. Rose of Lima Mission church. The parish first started as a log cabin mission church served by the Vincentians from Perryville, Missouri in the 1855. The first frame church was built in 1865, under William Vincent Moore, C.M. In the early 1870s, Father Joseph Hellwing, who had just become pastor of St. Mary's at Biehle, Missouri, also gave services here. Father William Vincent Moore, C.M., a local Missouri native, who studied both at St. Mary's of the Barrens Seminary and later in Cape Girardeau, Missouri, also served there.

The stone church was constructed under direction of Father Denis D. Leyden, C. M. in 1877-79 of unique colored stone blocks, and was known as Holy Innocents. The brothers and students at St. Mary's of the Barrens donated 30,000 shingles for the roof of the new church. The Silver Lake church was changed to St. Rose of Lima, in 1885–1886, under Father Pommer and Father E. J. Wynne, apparently as a response to the completion of the new stone church.
