= St. Boniface Roman Catholic Church (Perryville, Missouri) =

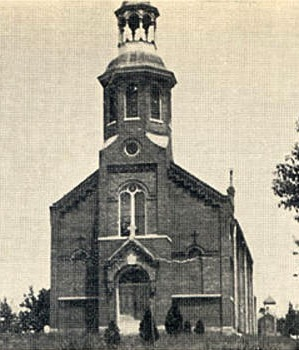

- Location within Missouri
- 37°43′34″N 89°52′18″W
- Location: Perryville, Missouri
- Country: United States
- Denomination: Roman Catholic Church

History
- Founded: 1865
- Consecrated: 1868

Architecture
- Completed: 1869

Administration
- Archdiocese: Archdiocese of St. Louis

St. Boniface Parish Church and Parish was a Roman Catholic church in Perryville, Missouri.

== History ==
Two major waves of German migration to Perry County, Missouri brought German Lutherans from Saxony (present-day eastern Thuringia) and German Catholics from Baden.

In the 1860s, German Catholic migration from the Baden region of Germany had led to the establishing of a number of German Catholic parishes in Perry County. Perryville already had a Catholic church and parish: St. Mary's of the Assumption. However, due to cultural and linguistic reasons, a second separate parish was established for the German-speaking community and their descendants. The name St. Boniface was conferred in honor of St. Boniface, the patron saint of Germany. The church was built in 1868 by Reverend Henry Grall. St. Boniface parish had been under responsibility of diocesan priests until 1947.

=== St. Boniface Grade School ===
Although the “English” Catholics had settled in Perryville well before the German Catholics arrived, it was the Germans who set up the first Catholic grade school in Perryville. The Precious Blood Sisters, a German Catholic female order, were the first to open a school for these children in 1887. Later, the Ursulines, another female order, replaced the Precious Blood Sisters and opened a boarding school for the girls of St. Boniface Parish. The boys are believed to have been educated at the Seminary school at St. Mary's of the Barrens.

In 1947, the Ursuline Sisters withdrew from St. Boniface Grade School. That year, St. Boniface Grade School and St. Vincent Grade School were merged into a single school. The St. Boniface School Building became the Primary School for Kindergarten through Third Grade. The St. Vincent School Building taught grades Four through Twelve.

== Closure ==
In 1947, St. Boniface Church and Parish was merged with St. Mary’s (Assumption) Church and Parish to form the St. Vincent de Paul Church and Parish. St. Boniface was closed in 1964 and later razed.

== Gallery ==
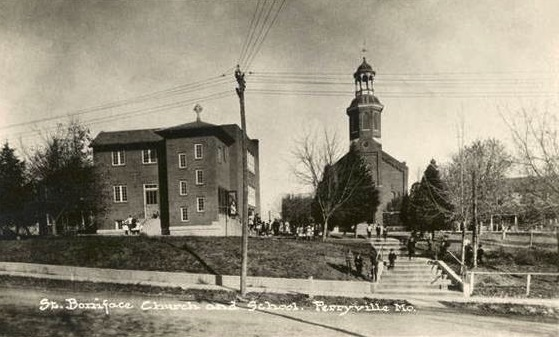
St. Boniface School (left) and Church (right) ca. 1913
