= St. Vincent de Paul Catholic Church (Perryville, Missouri) =

St. Vincent de Paul Roman Catholic Church
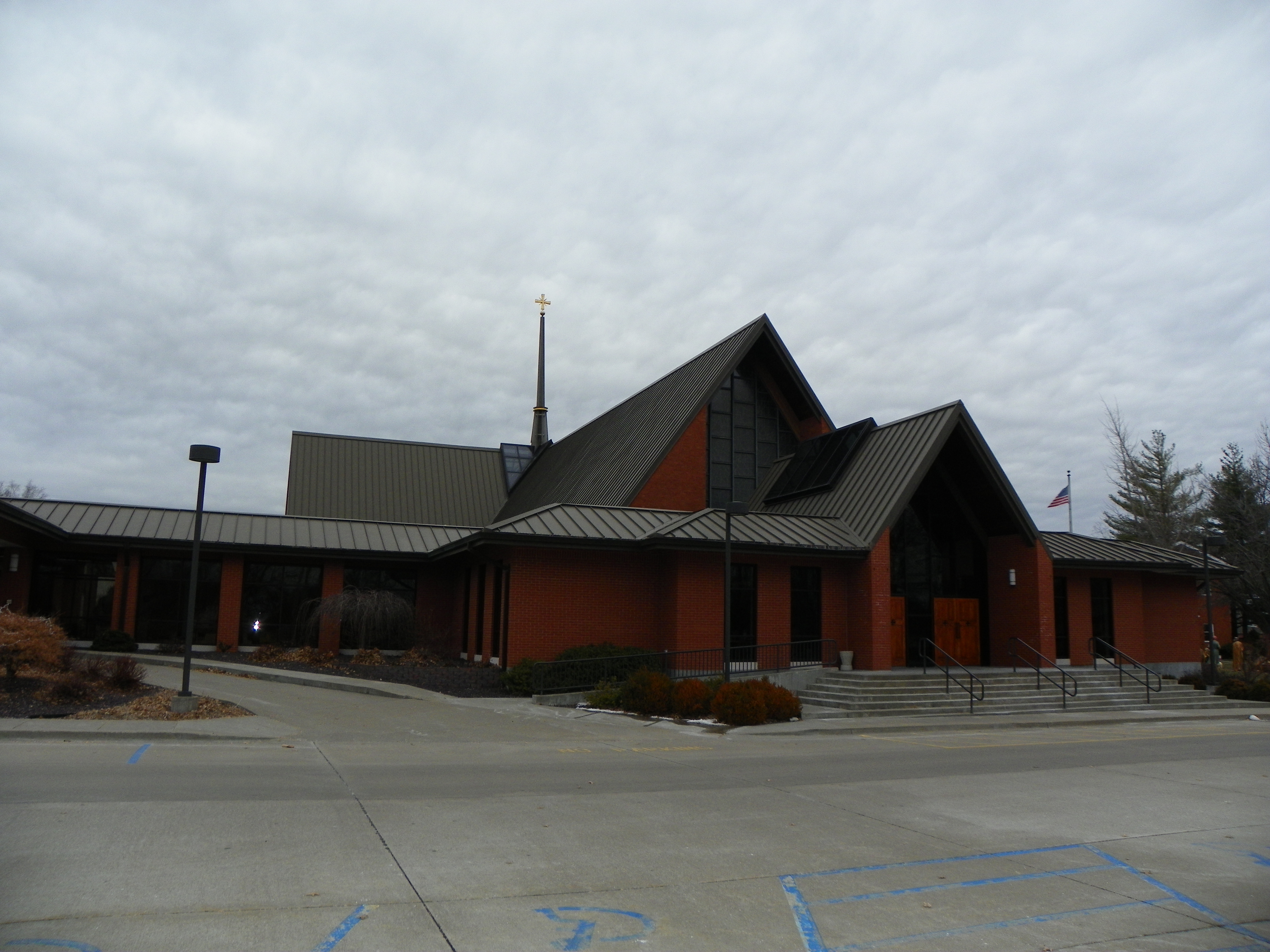

- Location within Missouri
- 37°43′27.47″N 89°52′34.09″W
- Location: 1010 Rosati Ct. Perryville, Missouri
- Country: United States
- Denomination: Roman Catholic Church
- Website: SVdP parish

History
- Founded: 1817
- Consecrated: 1965

Architecture
- Groundbreaking: 1960
- Completed: 1965

Administration
- Archdiocese: Archdiocese of St. Louis
- Deanery: Ste. Genevieve

Clergy
- Archbishop: Most Rev. Robert Carlson

St. Vincent de Paul Church is a Roman Catholic church in Perryville, Missouri. It was completed in 1965, but has roots in a Catholic community that built its first church in Perryville in 1817.

== Name ==
St. Vincent de Paul Church Perryville was named in honor of Vincent de Paul, a Catholic priest dedicated to serving the poor, and founder of the Vincentians.

== History ==
In the early 1800s, American Catholics from Kentucky had migrated into southeastern Missouri. These migrants were so-called English Catholics or Maryland Catholics because they had earlier migrated to Kentucky from Maryland, which had been set up originally as a haven for Catholics. They settled around present-day Perryville in a treeless prairie called The Barrens. This name may also harken to Barren County in Kentucky where many of these Catholics had migrated from. In the early days they built a log church, but lacked a resident priest, and depended on the occasional priest traveler, and later depended on the monthly visit of priests from Ste. Genevieve and elsewhere. In 1817, the Catholic settlers learned that the new Bishop of Louisiana intended to establish a diocese in St. Louis. The Catholic settlers sent a committee to St. Louis to petition for a permanent priest. In March 1817, the bishop arrived in The Barrens and, being impressed by the prospects, arranged for the Vincentian priests which he had recruited in Italy to move from Kentucky to Perry County, Missouri.

The first house and the log church were blessed in 1820. Desire for a more permanent structure led to plans for a new church, with the foundation stone being laid in 1827. Ten years later St. Mary's (Assumption) Church was completed and consecrated on October 29, 1837.

=== St. Mary's (Assumption) Parish ===
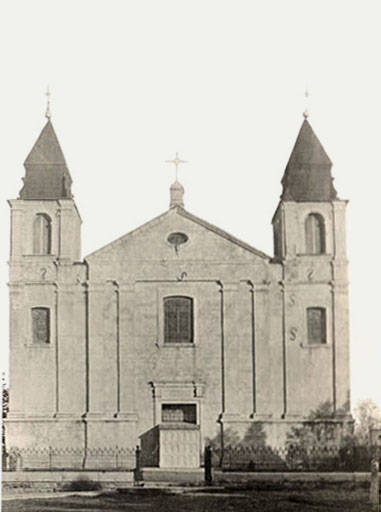
St. Mary’s (Assumption) Church ca. 1913

St Mary's (Assumption) Parish served the local English-speaking parish and population from 1817 until its closure in 1965. The parish church was St. Mary's Church located at the St. Mary of the Barrens Seminary. St. Mary's (Assumption) parish had been under responsibility of diocesan priests until 1947.

=== St. Boniface Parish ===
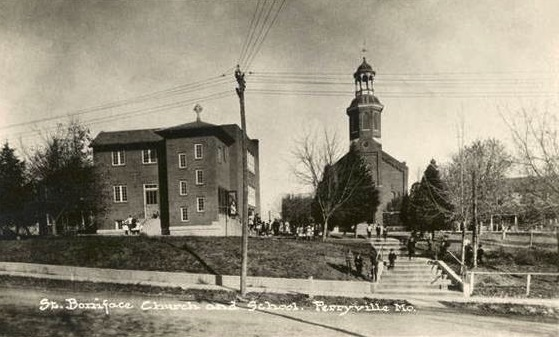
St. Boniface School (left) and Church (right) ca. 1913

In 1865, German Catholic migration from the Baden region of Germany had led to the establishing of a second parish and church, St. Boniface Church, in Perryville for Catholics of German descent. The name St. Boniface was conferred in honor of St. Boniface, the patron saint of Germany. The church was built in 1868 by Reverend Henry Grall. St. Boniface parish was under responsibility of diocesan priests until 1947.

=== St. Vincent de Paul Parish ===
In 1947, St. Mary's (Assumption) Church and St. Boniface Church were merged into a single parish with the Vincentians taking responsibility for the joined parishes. In the early 1960s a new site was selected for the construction of a new church, which was to be named in honor of St. Vincent de Paul. The first Sunday Mass in St. Vincent de Paul Church was celebrated on May 30, 1965.

== Schools ==
=== St. Boniface Grade School ===
The first Catholic grade school in Perryville was opened to serve the German-speaking parish of St. Boniface., when the Precious Blood Sisters, a German Catholic female order opened a school for these children in 1887. Later the Ursulines, another female order, replaced the Precious Blood Sisters and opened a boarding school for the girls of St. Boniface Parish. It was believed that the boys were educated at the Seminary school at St. Mary's of the Barrens.

=== St. Vincent Grade School ===
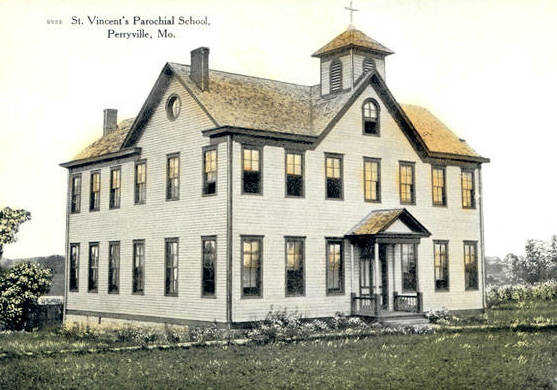
Old St. Vincent's Parochial School

In 1896, the people of St. Mary's (Assumption) Parish saw the need for the community’s English-speaking children to have their own school, and opened St. Vincent Grade School on the north side of St. Joseph Street. In 1907, four Daughters of Charity arrived from Emmitsburg, Maryland, to teach at St. Vincent's, and remained for about 90 years. By 1915, the old school had become inadequate that a new school building was built on the south side of St. Joseph Street. When classes began in the new DePaul School in 1917, there were 10 Sisters on the faculty and 332 students in both the grade school and high school. The DePaul School housed classes Kindergarten through grade twelve until 1947.

=== Merged Schools ===
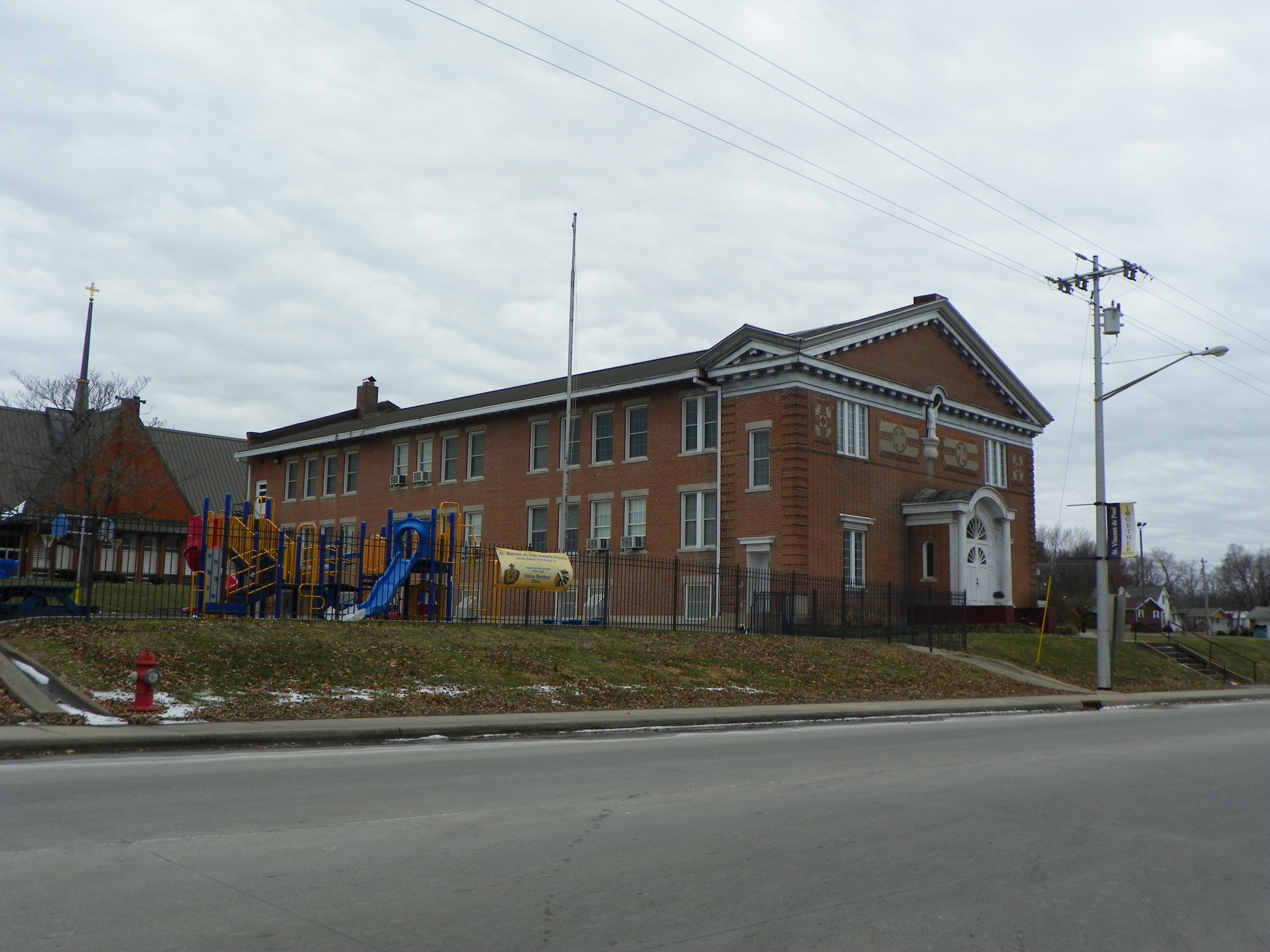
St. Vincent de Paul School

In 1947, the Ursuline Sisters withdrew from St. Boniface Grade School and it merged with St. Vincent Grade School. The Boniface building housed kindergarten through third grade and the Vincent building four through twelve. In 1953, high school students moved from the St. Vincent School Building into the new location where it continues to provide a Catholic education for grades 7-12. In 1985, conditions required a larger primary school building, and the old building was deteriorating. The present elementary building was dedicated on August 30, 1987. During the summer of 1992 the school was reorganized. Kindergarten through sixth grade were housed in the a new primary building, now called St. Vincent Elementary School. while seventh through twelfth grade students were housed in the high school building, now called St. Vincent Junior/Senior High School. The older grade school building was renamed the DePaul Building and is used for meeting rooms, band, and music classes.

== Gallery ==
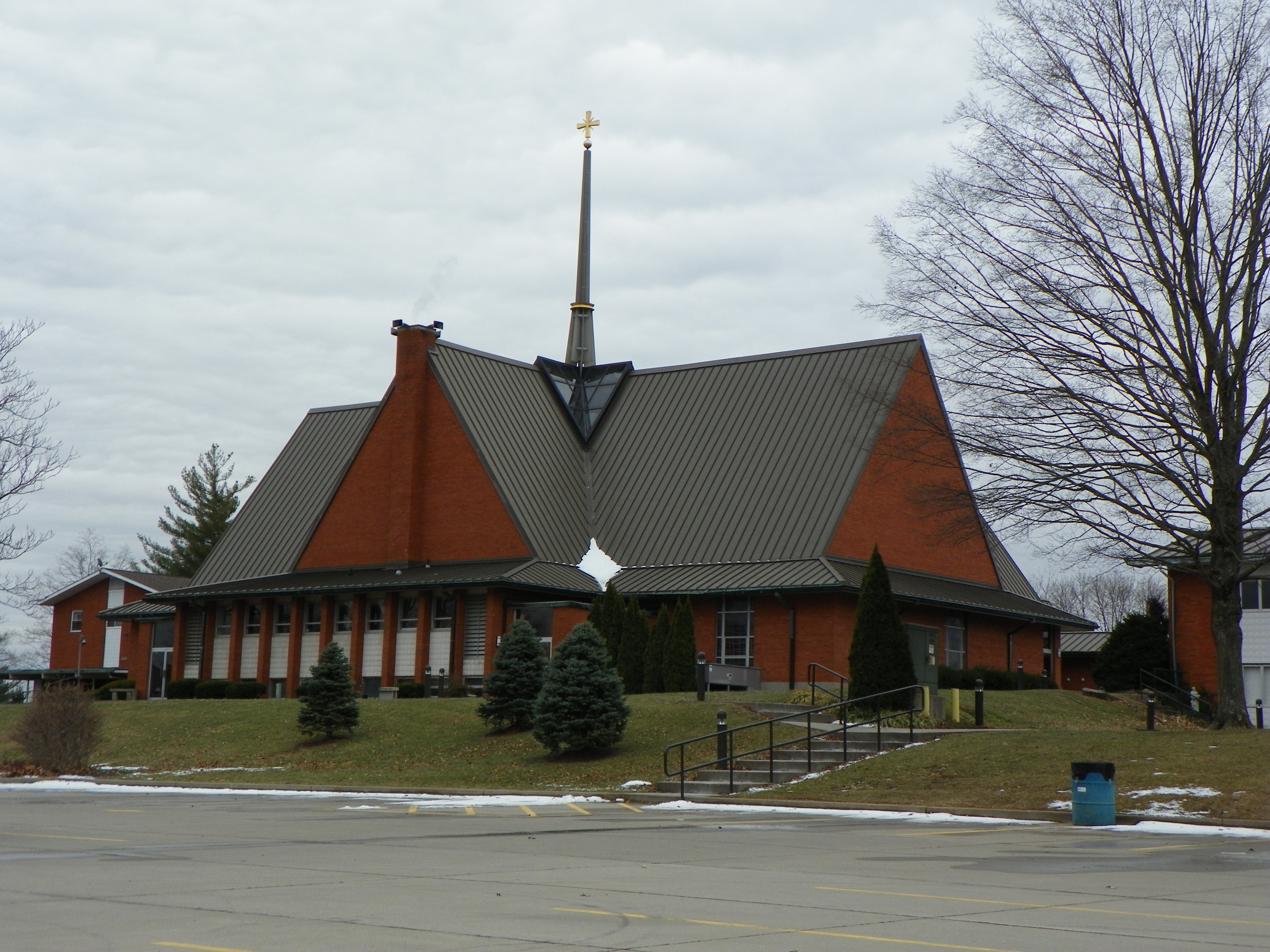
St. Vincent de Paul Church, 2014

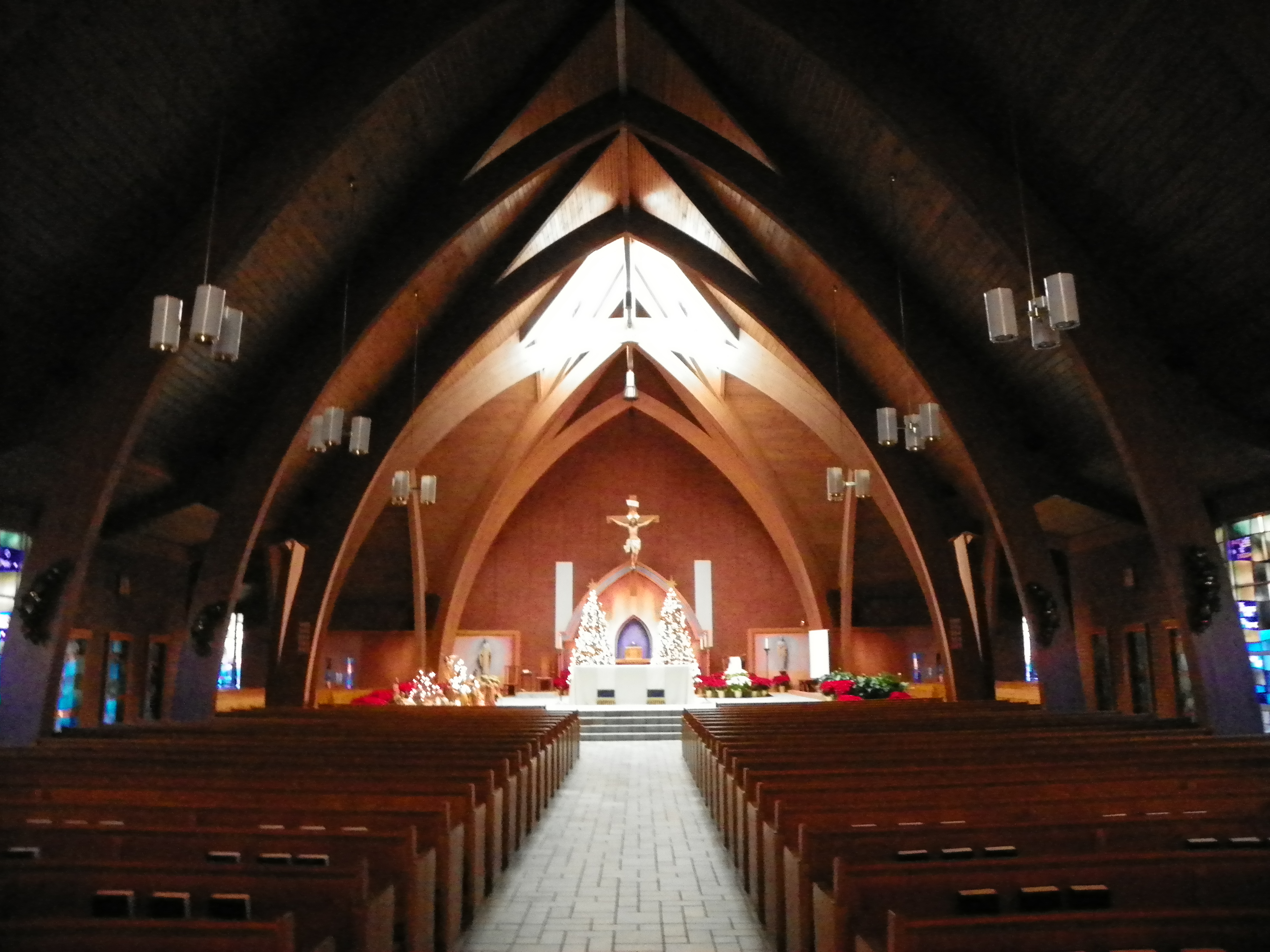
St. Vincent de Paul Church, interior

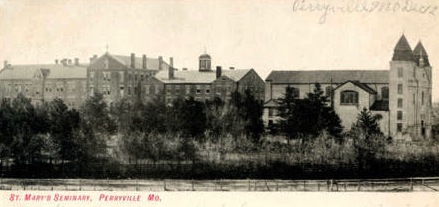
St. Mary's (Assumption) Church (right) and Seminary
