= Perry County Courthouse (Missouri) =

- Perry County Courthouse

General information
- Location: Perryville, Missouri, USA, 15 W Sainte Marie St.
- Coordinates: 37.72531°N 89.86304°W
- Completed: 1904
- Cost: $31,819 (1904 dollars)

Design and construction
- Architect: John W. Gaddis
- Main contractor: Caldwell and Drake, Columbus, Indiana

References
- Perry County Courthouse
- U.S. National Register of Historic Places
- Location: 15 W. Sainte Marie St., Perryville, Missouri
- Built: 1904
- Built by: Caldwell & Drake
- Architects: Gaddis, John W.
- Architectural style: Romanesque Revival
- NRHP reference No.: 16000286
- Added to NRHP: May 23, 2016

The Perry County Courthouse is a government building for Perry County that lies on the main square in Perryville, Missouri, United States.

== Early Structures ==
Four structures have served as the home of Perry County's courts and administration since Perry County's creation. The first structure was a temporary home for the court, while the latter three structures were constructed solely to house the county courts and administration. The first structure was a two-story log building which served as the site of the county court after the creation of Perry County in 1821, and housed the court until a courthouse building could be built in 1826. The first building solely built to serve as the county courthouse was constructed in 1826 at a cost of $1,486.25. No known photos exist of this building. The first courthouse building of 1826 was replaced in 1861 with a new two-story stone building at a cost of $8,000. The second courthouse building constructed in 1861, however, had eventually fallen into disrepair and was replaced with the third and present brick courthouse in 1903 at a cost of $31,819.

== History ==
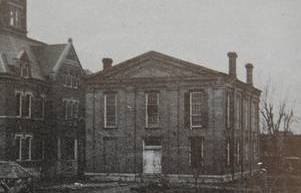
2nd Perry County Courthouse, 1861-1903

In the early days before statehood, court sessions took place in private homes or the parish houses. By 1821, the population of the Barrens and surrounding area warranted the separation of the southeastern portion of Ste. Genevieve County into a new county, Perry County. After Perry County was organized in 1821, the county court was established on May 21, 1821 in the home of Bede Moore, located two and half miles north of Perryville, by Lewis Cissell, D.L. Caldwell, and Samuel Anderson. County officials used a two-story log building for conducting county business. At first, there was a delay in building a court house as the population of Perry County had also been obliged to help fund the courthouse in Ste. Genevieve County, as they had been a part of that county. Commissioners were appointed to locate a seat of justice somewhere in the county, but no move was made toward the erection of a courthouse until 1825. Because of its centrality, population, and location on the historic road between Ste. Genevieve and Cape Girardeau, the area just east of the Barrens was chosen to be the seat of Perry County. Bernard Layton donated fifty-one acres of his land one-half miles east of St. Mary's Seminary for the site of a county-seat town, Perryville.

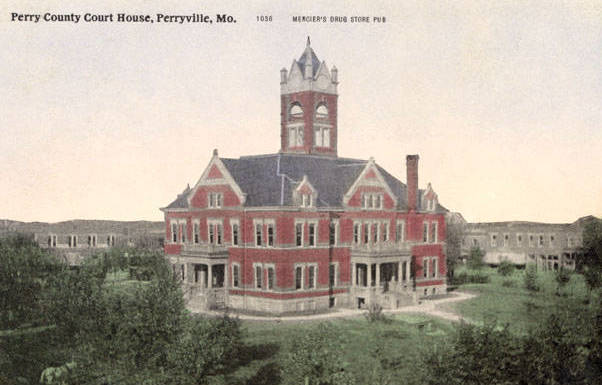
3rd Perry County Courthouse, 1909

In 1825, it was decided that a more permanent building was needed to house the county court and administration, so a contract was let for the first courthouse. Funding of the $1,486.25 (1825 dollars) project came from the sale of 55 lots of property deeded to the county by Bernard Layton. No known illustrations of the structure exist. By 1859, a growing county created a need for more space. The court appropriated $8,000 (1859 dollars) for construction and appointed John E. Layton as superintendent of the construction. The two-story building was completed in 1861. The site of the building was on the northeast corner of the square. The building continued in use until after the turn of the century. Grand jury reports from that time indicated the condition of the building was beyond repair. After county residents presented a petition calling for an election on September 1, 1903, voters approved a proposition for a $30,000 bond issue to finance a new courthouse. From several plans submitted in November, the court selected the proposal of Caldwell and Drake, Columbus, Indiana, who were then contracted for construction. Construction began in February, 1904. The cornerstone ceremonies were conducted on June 4, 1904. The total cost on the red brick, 65-by-92-foot building was $31,819. The county continues to use the courthouse for county court and administration purposes. The building was listed on the National Register of Historic Places in 2016.

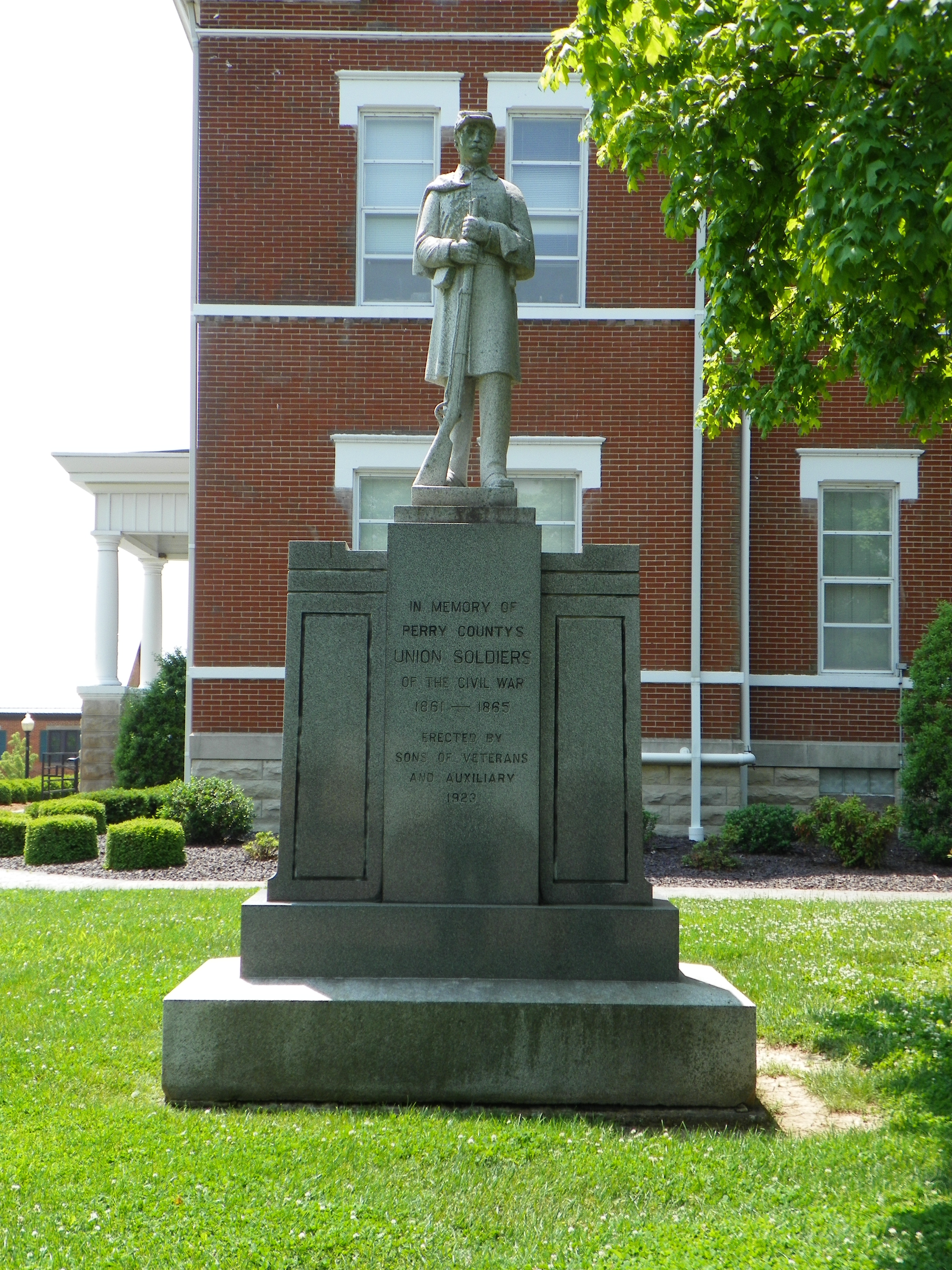
Civil War Memorial

== Circuit Court ==
The Perry County Court House is home to Perry County, Judicial Circuit 32.

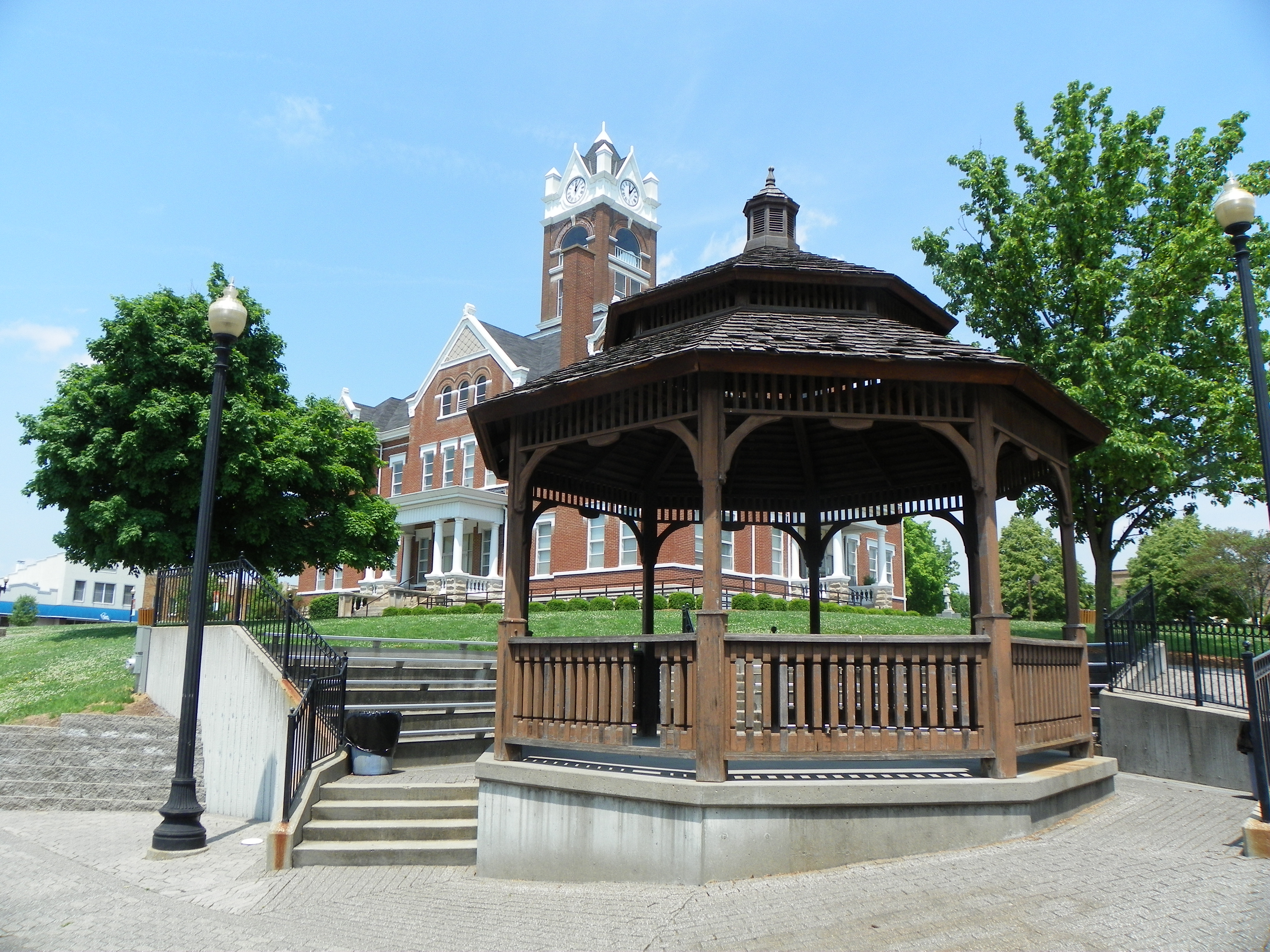
Gazebo

== Courthouse Square ==
The courthouse is located on the main square in Perryville, and is complete with a chiming clock tower. On the grounds are a war memorial, civil war memorial, a "Camino Real" Marker and a number of other markers. Around the courthouse is the courthouse lawn which features a brick paved plaza, landscaped seating areas, park benches, a sundial, a directional marker and a gazebo.

== See also ==
- National Register of Historic Places listings in Perry County, Missouri
