= Immanuel Lutheran School (Perryville, Missouri) =

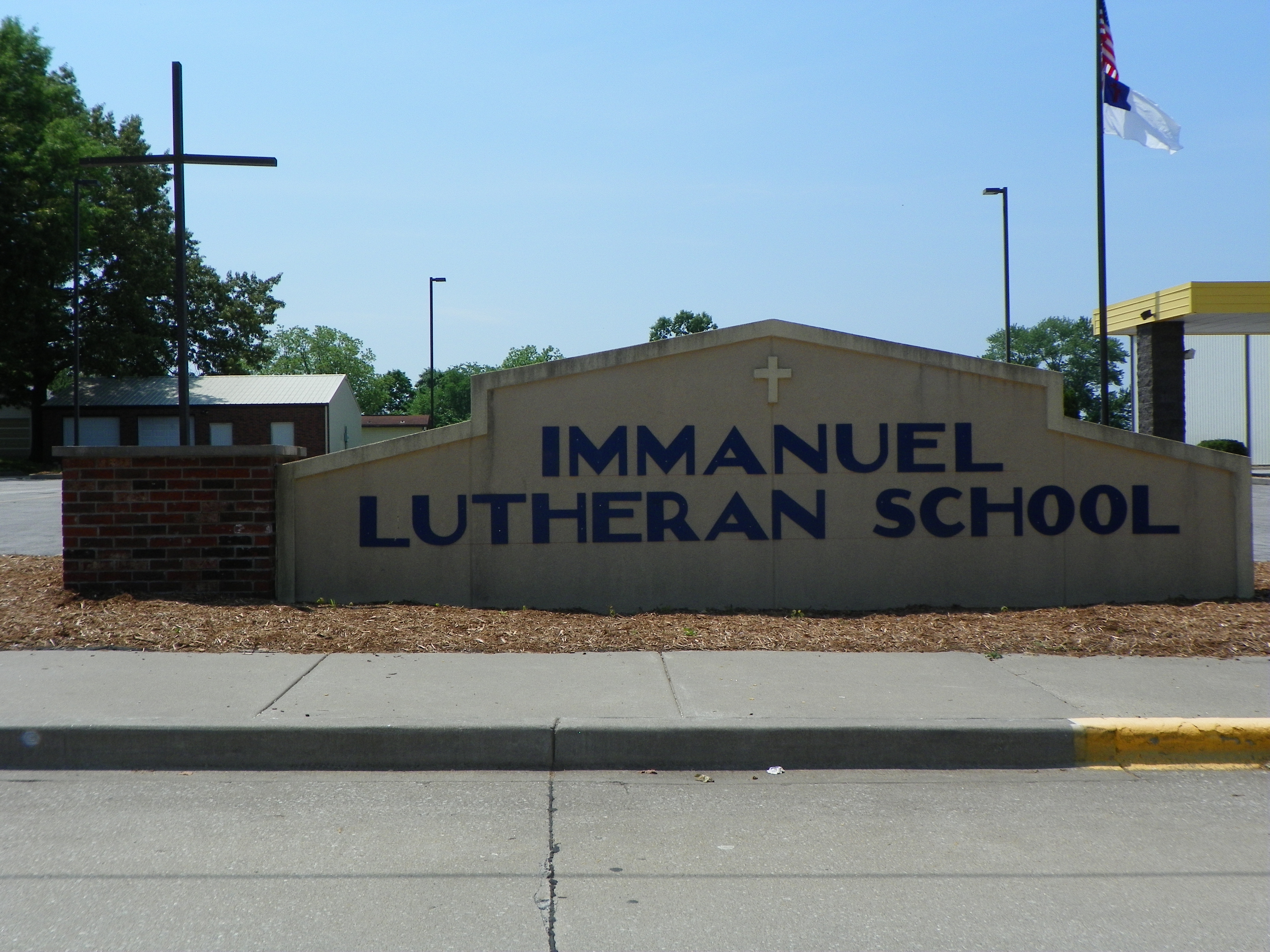

Location
- 225 W South St. Perryville, Missouri; United States; 38°43′03″N 90°17′02″W

Information
- Type: Private
- Religious affiliation: Lutheranism
- Denomination: Lutheran Church–Missouri Synod
- Principal: Andy Spieler
- Grades: PK-8
- Enrollment: 211
- Colors: Black and gold
- Team name: Warriors
- Accreditation: NLSA, MO Chapter
- Website: www.ilsperryville.org/aboutourschool

Immanuel Lutheran School is located in Perryville, Missouri, United States. It is a private school that serves 211 students in grades PK and K-8. Immanuel Lutheran School is coed and is affiliated with the Lutheran Church–Missouri Synod.

== History ==
Immanuel Lutheran School was consecrated on September 6, 1908. The school originally instructed in both German and English.

== Staff ==
Velda Hurtling is the principal of Immanuel Lutheran.

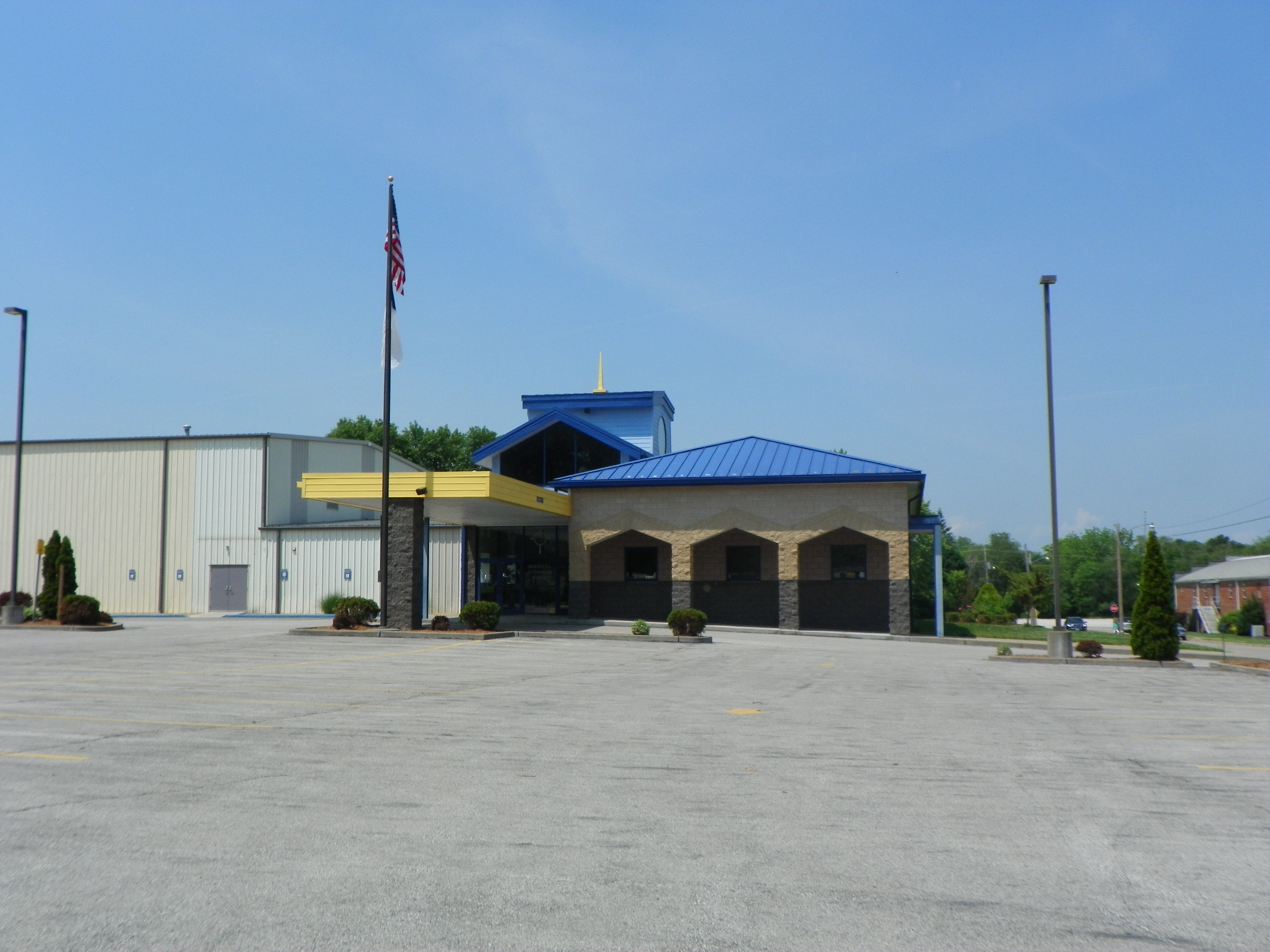
Immanuel Lutheran School
