= Doerr–Brown House =

Historic house in Missouri, United States

- U.S. National Register of Historic Places
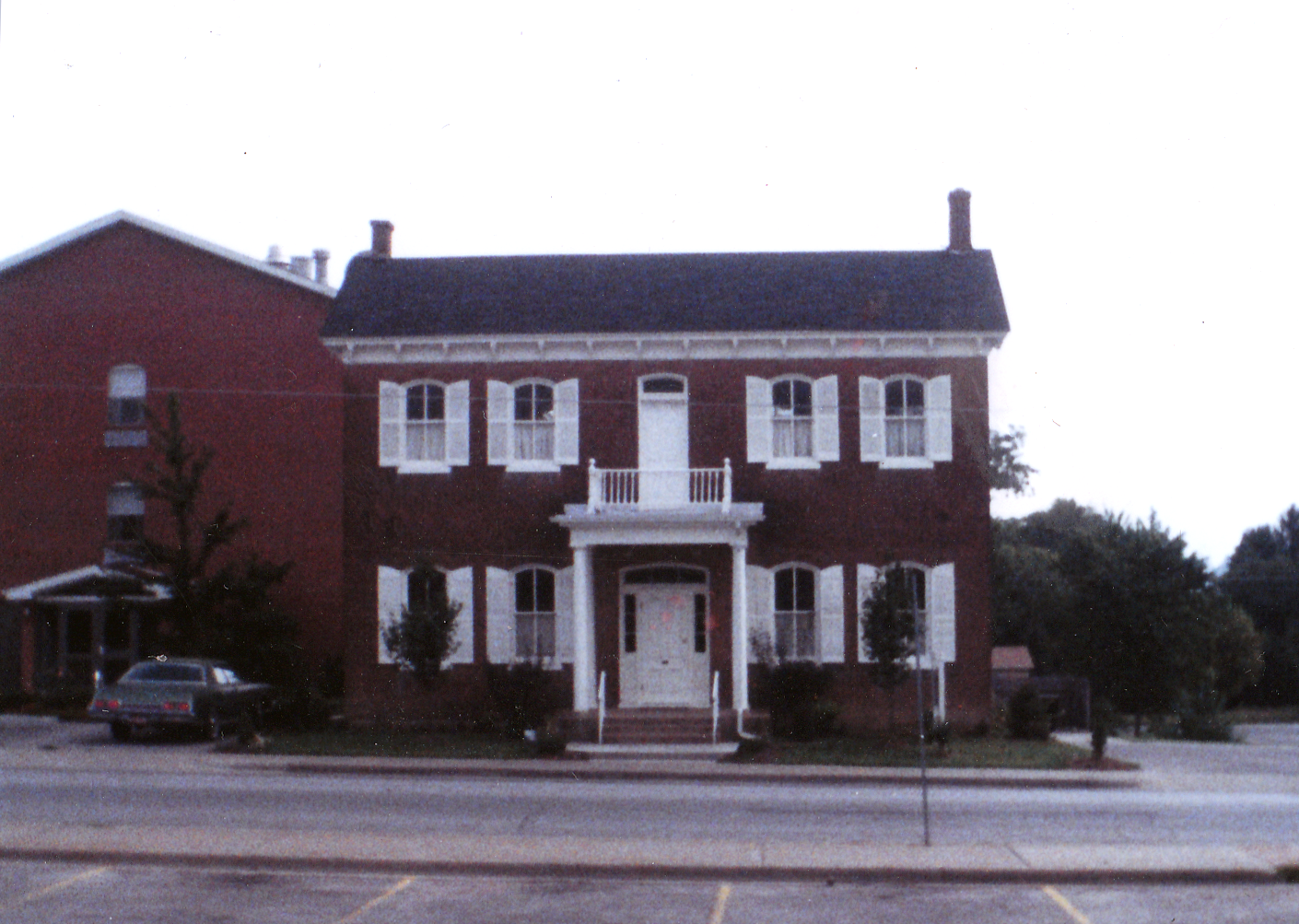
- Doerr–Brown House

- Location within Missouri Location within the United States
- Location: 17 E. St. Joseph St., Perryville, Missouri
- Coordinates: 37°43′26″N 89°51′40″W
- Architectural style: Missouri L German shaped house
- NRHP reference No.: 80002388
- Added to NRHP: November 14, 1980

The Doerr–Brown House is a "Missouri German house" in Perryville, Missouri.

== Description ==
The Doerr–Brown House is a two-storied, single-dwelling, L-shaped, brick home located in the central part of Perryville, Missouri. The structure represents the Missouri German style house of 1870 vintage. The structure is a 6-room, L-shaped residential building with two and one half stories in front and one story on the side. It measures 38’ 10’’ on the north façade, 42’ 2’’ west, 18’ east, and 22’ 3’’ south. The foundation is made of quarry hewn limestone which appears 18’’ from the ground.

== History ==
The first recorded dwelling at this location was built by pioneer doctor Richard S. Dorsey. Records show that Arsan Gallier purchased the lot in 1875. The brick house was built sometime between 1875 and 1870. In 1896 the house was purchased by Louis Doerr. Doerr's daughter married the County Court Judge Robert Brown and the house remained in the family until 1976. Thomas B. and Helen Ward Sanders purchased the residence in 1976 as a museum for Perry County history.

It was listed on the National Register of Historic Places in 1980.
