= Eggers and Company General Store =

- U.S. National Register of Historic Places
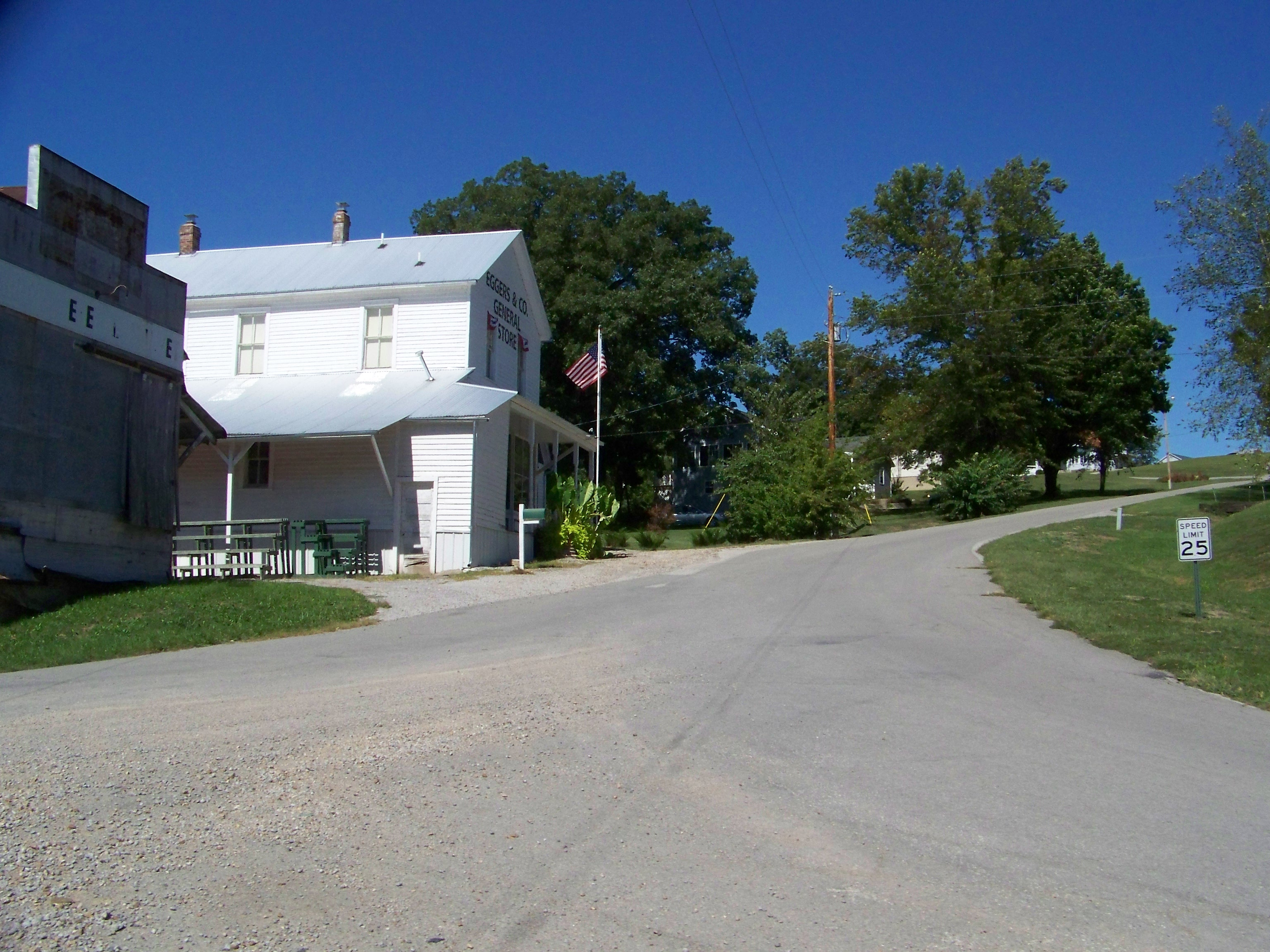
- Eggers and Company General Store, July 2006

- Location within Missouri Location within the United States
- Location: 19 PCR 32B, Farrar, Missouri
- Coordinates: 37°42′9″N 89°41′18″W
- Area: 1.2 acres (0.49 ha)
- Built: 1894
- Architectural style: Two-part commercial block
- NRHP reference No.: 07000570
- Added to NRHP: June 21, 2007

The Eggers and Company General Store is a historic general store located at Farrar, Perry County, Missouri. It was built in 1894, and is a two-story, frame building on a limestone foundation and clad in weatherboard. Attached to the store is a 1 1/2-story frame dwelling clad in weatherboard. Also on the property are the contributing tin feed warehouse (c. 1905) and a transverse crib barn (c. 1900).

It was listed on the National Register of Historic Places in 2007.
