= Shelby–Nicholson–Schindler House =

Historic house in Missouri, United States

- U.S. National Register of Historic Places
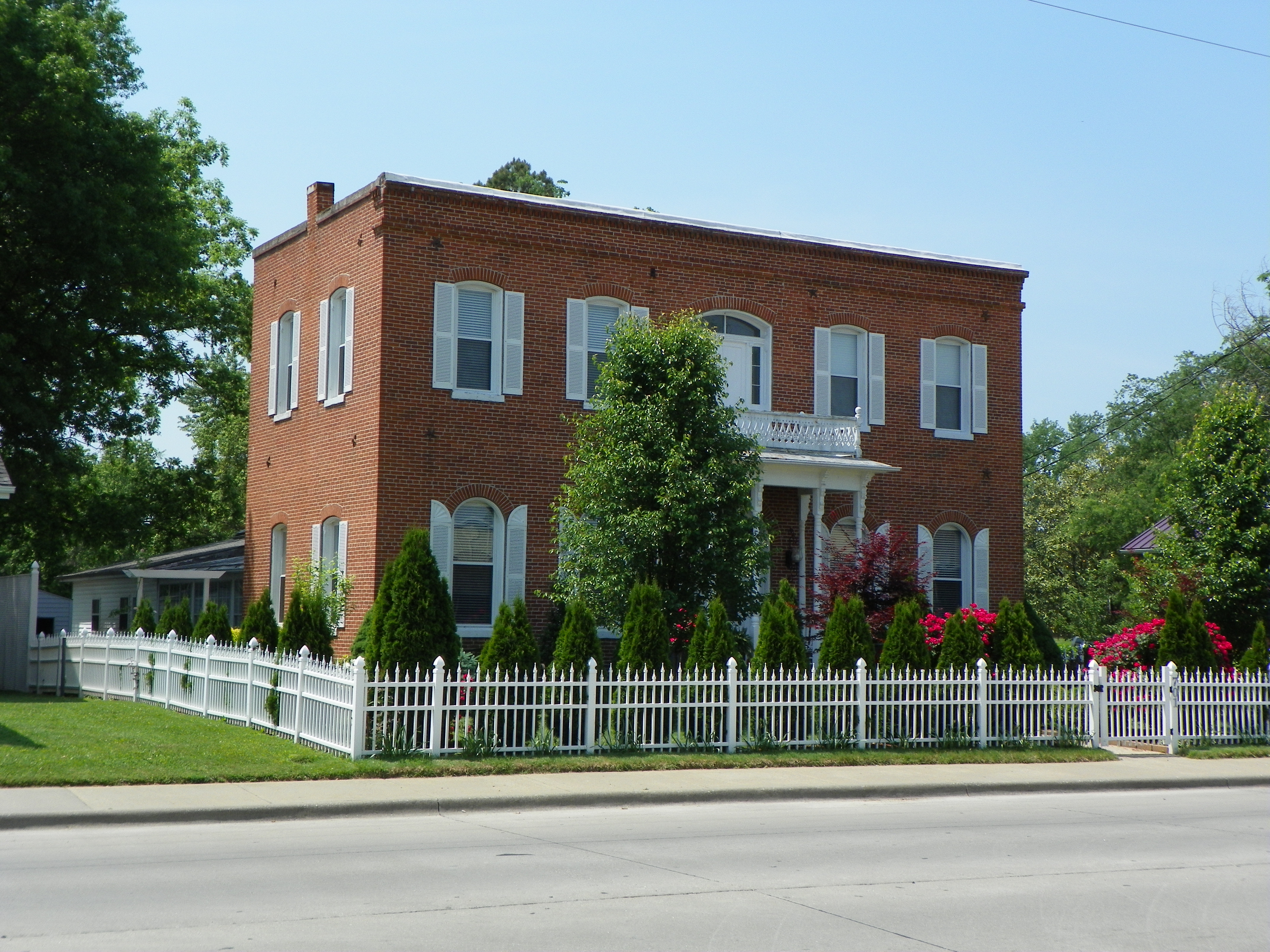
- Shelby–Nicholson–Schindler House

- Location within Missouri Location within the United States
- Location: 701 W. St. Joseph St., Perryville, Missouri
- Coordinates: 37°43′30″N 89°52′15″W
- Area: 1 acre (0.40 ha)
- Architectural style: Missouri L-shaped house
- NRHP reference No.: 74001088
- Added to NRHP: July 24, 1974

The Shelby–Nicholson–Schindler House is a "Missouri L-shaped house" in Perryville, Missouri.

== Description ==
The Shelby–Nicholson–Schindler House is located in the western part of Perryville, Missouri, and is situated on approximately one acre of land.

The structure itself is a five-bay, 12-room, L-shaped residential building. The porches are attached along the north, south, and east facades. A wash house, the only outbuilding, is attached to the house by the southeast porch. The main portion of the house measures 46 feet, 2 inches along the north facade, and 23 feet on the east and west facades. The rear wing is 28 feet 1 inch by 30 feet. The enclosed southwest porch is 13 feet one inch on the west facade and 12 feet 7 inches on the south facade. The wash house is 12 feet 3 inches by 16 feet 4 inches.

The foundations of the main portion of the house are made of cut stone, while the rear wing's foundation is made of rubble stone interfiled with cement. The outer walls of the house are made of red brick. The porches are made of wood and painted white.

== History ==
The first recorded owner of the house was Dr. Reuben Shelby of Greene County, Pennsylvania, who was an early American settler of Missouri in the 1830s. He was a medical doctor by profession and active in politics. Between 1860 and 1870 the house changed hands four times.

In 1870, 20th Circuit Court judge John H. Nicholson and his wife Amalia purchased the house.
