= St. Mary's of the Barrens =

Historic church in Missouri, United States

St. Mary's of the Barrens Church
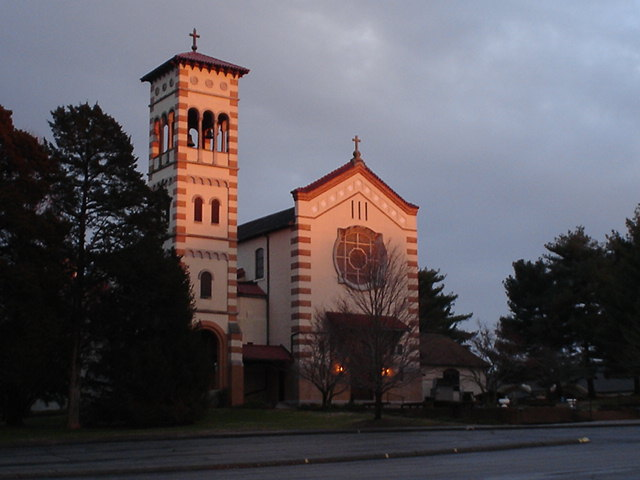

- Location within Missouri Location within the United States
- 37°43′36″N 89°53′03″W
- Location: 1811 W St Joseph St; Perryville, Missouri 63775
- Country: United States
- Denomination: Roman Catholic Church

History
- Founded: 1818
- Consecrated: 1837

Architecture
- Groundbreaking: 1827
- Completed: 1837

Administration
- Archdiocese: Archdiocese of St. Louis
- Deanery: Ste. Genevieve

Clergy
- Archbishop: Most Rev. Mitchell Rozanski
- Rector
- St. Mary's of the Barrens Historic District
- U.S. National Register of Historic Places
- U.S. Historic district
- Location: SW of the jct. of W. Saint Joseph St. and MO 51, Perryville, Missouri
- Area: 34 acres (14 ha)
- Architect: Hess, Henry P., et al.; Furlong, T.J.
- Architectural style: Late 19th And 20th Century Revivals
- NRHP reference No.: 95001041
- Added to NRHP: August 25, 1995

St. Mary's of the Barrens is a Catholic church and former seminary in Perryville, Missouri. St. Mary's is the historic seat of the American Vincentians and since its establishment in 1818 has served as an educational institution, a Vincentian house of formation, and a Vincentian community residence. The complex of eight contributing buildings, one contributing site, and two contributing structures was listed on the National Register of Historic Places in 1995 as St. Mary's of the Barrens Historic District. St. Mary's is the home of the National Shrine of Our Lady of the Miraculous Medal.

== History ==
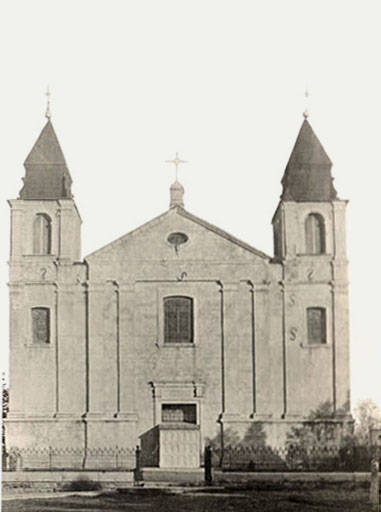
St. Mary's of the Assumption

The founding of St. Mary's of the Barrens, Perryville, Missouri, predates the founding of the State of Missouri by two years, and was the first seminary west of the Mississippi River.

St. Mary's of the Barrens was founded by the Congregation of the Mission, also known as the Vincentians or Lazarists. The Catholic population of Perryville was in need of a permanent resident priest, and offered 640 acres of land to Bishop Louis William Valentine DuBourg in exchange for the regular services of a priest and a school for the children. In 1815, Bishop Dubourg was in Rome recruiting priests for the Louisiana Territory, a huge diocese that embraced all of the territory of the Louisiana Purchase. While in Italy, DuBourg stayed at Monte Citorio, the mother church of the Congregation of the Mission order in Rome, and eventually convinced the Vincentians to send a contingent to Missouri to construct a seminary. These two groups of priests and brothers under Felix De Andreis (1877-1820) and Joseph Rosati (1789-1843) left for the United States in the fall of 1815. They stayed in the Baltimore area in 1816, and then moved to Bardstown, Kentucky in 1817 to further their preparations for Missouri. When DuBourg obtained the land grant of 640 acres from the Maryland Catholic immigrants of Perry County, they left to establish St. Mary's of the Barrens seminary in October 1818.

== The seminary ==
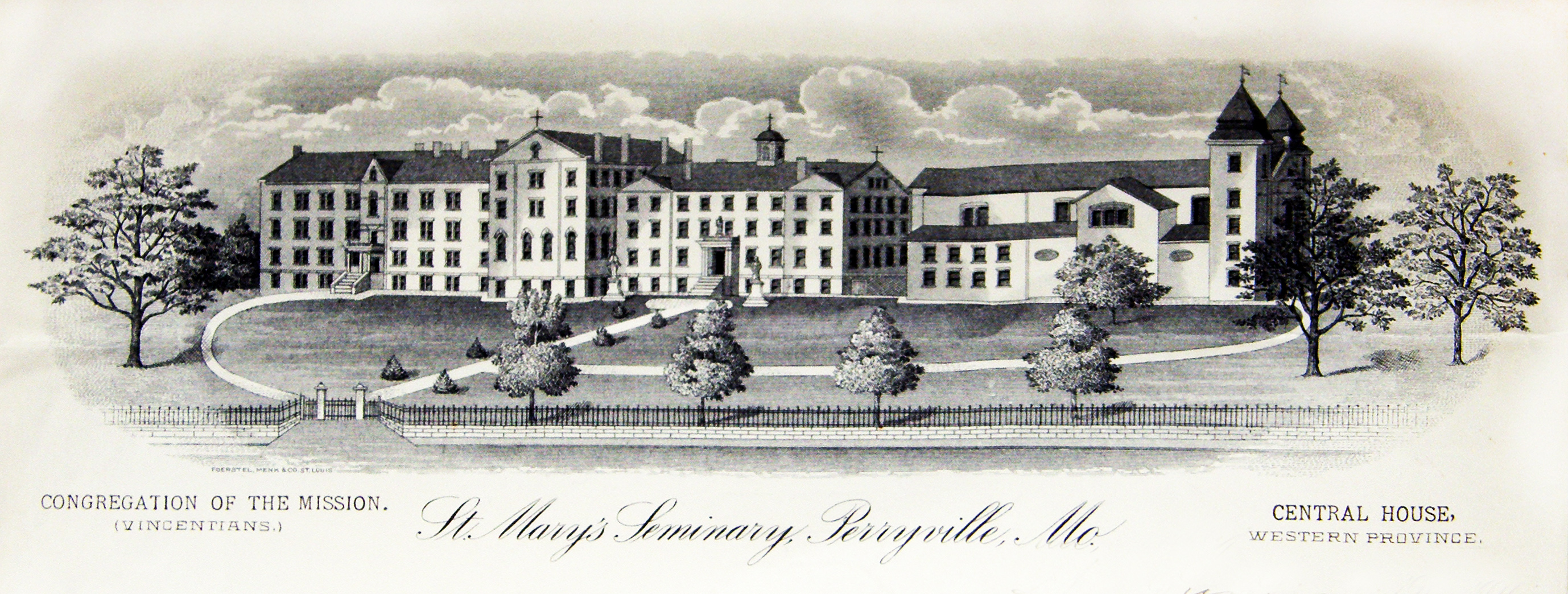
Seminary college

Father Charles de la Croix was skilled in architecture and drew up the plans for both the Church and Seminary. De la Croix was listed as an expert architect who had recently completed the Seminary of St. Thomas at Bardstown, Kentucky, and the seminary plans that he drew up for St. Mary's were to be modeled after Bardstown. The planned building was to be 60 feet by 36 feet, and 2 1/2 stories tall, with a full basement, 2 halls, 2 cellars each 25 feet by 17 feet, plastered on inside and outside, although the resulting building was said to have been a combination log-house, frame-house, brick-house, stone-house, all depending on unforeseen construction compromises.

Bishop DuBourg purchased a sawmill about one and a half miles from the seminary to provide lumber for the construction of the seminary. The construction began in 1817, but before the seminary building was completed, Father de la Croix and two Flemish brothers from Bardstown were transferred to help build church buildings elsewhere. Father Rosati took over the supervision of the seminary construction, and appointed Father Francis Cellini to finish supervision of construction. The wooden seminary structure was built in 1834, and was still standing in 1900. However, it was torn down in the 1913 renovations. The seminary at Perryville was the official seminary of the entire St. Louis diocese until 1842, when the diocesan seminary was moved to St. Louis. Thereafter, St. Mary's was reserved only for training Vincentians seminarians. The Novitiate was moved from Perryville to Cape Girardeau in 1841. Notable alumni included John L. Tiernon, a career United States Army officer who retired as a brigadier general.

=== Closures ===
The seminary was closed in 1863 and the students moved to Philadelphia. It was again reopened in 1888, and many buildings were gradually added to the campus. Due to declining enrollment of students, down to 35 seminary students in the last year of operation, the decision was made to close the seminary. St. Mary's of the Barrens officially closed with the commencement exercises of May 18, 1985.

== The Assumption of the Blessed Virgin Mary Parish ==
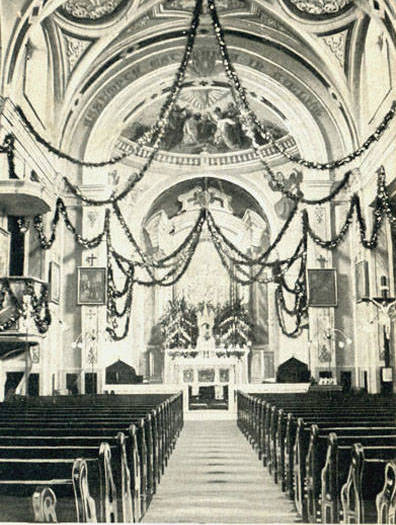
Interior of the Assumption of the Blessed Virgin Mary Church

The Assumption of the Blessed Virgin Mary Parish served the local English-speaking parish and population from 1817 until its merger with the German-speaking St. Boniface Parish to form St. Vincent's Parish in 1965. The parish church was renamed St. Mary's Church in honor of St. Mary of the Barrens Seminary.

== St. Mary's Church ==
Initial work on the Assumption of the Blessed Virgin Mary Parish, which included what later would become St. Mary's of the Barrens, was begun in 1818 based on the plans from Father de la Croix, and finished in 1820 at a cost of $800. However, the rapid growth of the parish led to the need of a more permanent, larger church. New church plans were proposed in 1826 to replace the original wood church. The plans were based on the original plans of Monte Citorio, both in ground-plan and size. Construction was begun in 1826 and the church was to be a replica of the Vincentian Motherhouse Church in Rome, Monte Citorio. Monte Citorio in Rome is of the Tuscan Renaissance style, and this became the general model for St. Mary's of the Barrens church. It was the first non-cathedral church consecrated west of the Mississippi River and was built from stone quarried on the Barrens property. Limestone was quarried on the Seminary lands, not far from the present church.

The cornerstone was laid on January 1, 1827, and foundation excavations were begun January 6, 1827. Apparently, work on the site was then stalled for several years, because the original plans were deemed to be too elaborate and too expensive to complete.

Father Jean-Marie Odin was sent to Europe in 1831 to secure funds to complete the church, and when he returned, Angelo Oliva, was appointed to be in charge of the new church construction. The new church construction plans called for a revised building design which was reduced to one-third of the size of the original plan. The building was built with limestone is 124 feet long and 64 feet wide. The church was consecrated October 29, 1837 by Bishop Rosati.

A number of improvements and additions were made between 1888 and 1893. During the renovations of 1888, the soft stone of the towers was found to be in a state of disintegration thus making the towers unstable. The cedar shake roof was covered with a tin roof in 1888. A new stained glass window was placed over the entry door in 1889.

In 1913, further renovations were made. The two towers on the front of the church were razed due to the problems with the soft crumbling stone. The interior of the church was of Tuscan design. The interior has high Roman arches with two domes, one over the sanctuary and one over the center of the church. The sanctuary is 30 feet square under a dome 45 feet in height. The interior walls are decorated with murals and paintings. Seven small altars are located on the sides of the nave. The front of the church was expanded through the addition of two side altars and a vestibule, extending the length by 40 feet. The facade was changed from a Tuscan Renaissance style to the Romanesque style. Later additions include the Miraculous Medal Shrine in 1930, and the current Angelus bell tower which was constructed in 1980. St. Mary's of the Barrens functioned as a parish church until 1965 when a new parish church was built, thus becoming an independent "public church" in which liturgical services are held regularly. Today Saint Mary's Church serves as both a Marian Shrine and Vincentian Community Chapel.

=== National Shrine of Our Lady of the Miraculous Medal ===
The National Shrine of Our Lady of the Miraculous Medal was built in 1929, replacing the Chapel of St. Vincent. There is a dome over the shrine. The Venerable Felix de Andreis is buried beneath the shrine floor. In the shrine, a novena of masses is offered each month for members of the Association of the Miraculous Medal.

== Sacristy of Bishop Rosati ==
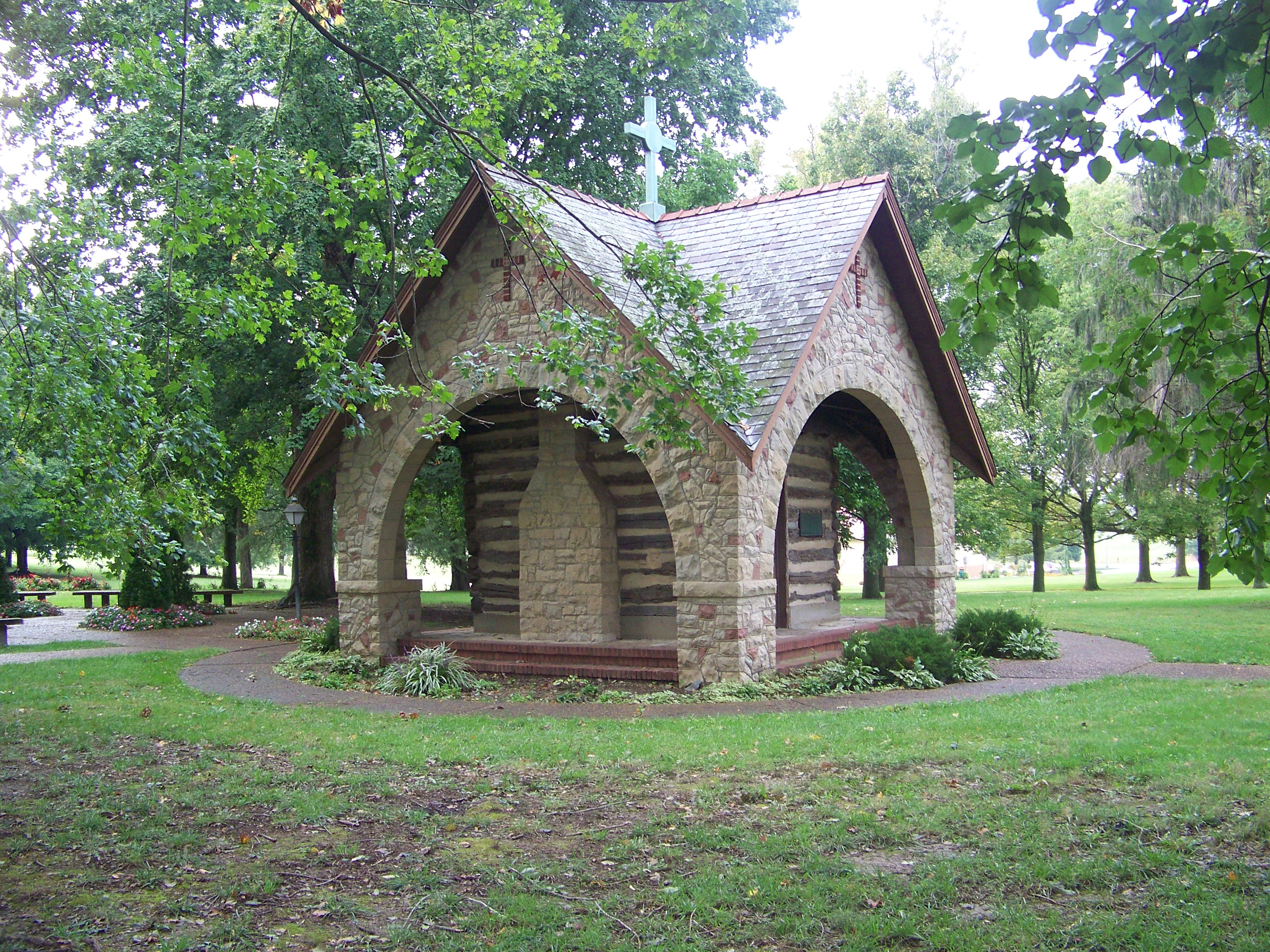
Seminary college

The Sacristy of Bishop Rosati is an old log cabin that is now the oldest original structure on the St. Mary's campus. The hewn log building, often referred to as Rosati's Cabin, was used as a sacristy to the first church. The cabin is a single log pen with V notched corners, and was built around 1825. In a move to preserve the cabin, it was set on a concrete foundation in 1932 and placed under a large arched stone pavilion to protect it from the elements.

== Grotto ==
The Grotto of Our Lady of the Miraculous Medal was built during World War I by the seminarians on the site of the stone quarry used to construct St. Mary's Church. Construction began in June 1917 and was completed in November 1920. A small outdoor chapel is recessed in the center of the grotto wall and contains a small altar made of fieldstone. In a small niche at the top of the grotto wall, above the small chapel, is a statue of our Lady of the Miraculous Medal.

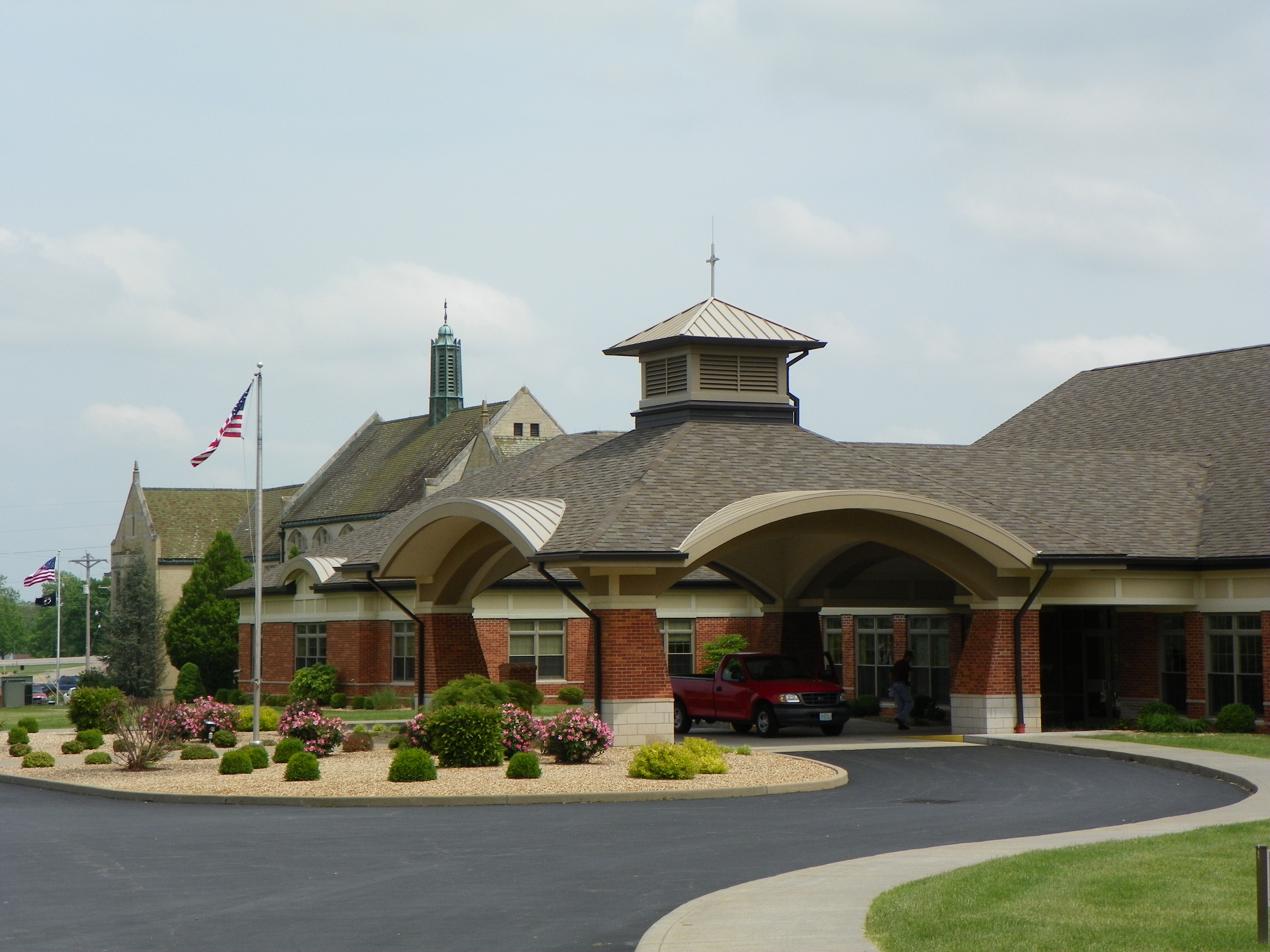
Apostle of Charity Residence

== Retirement home ==
In August 2004, the Midwest Province of the Congregation of the Mission decided to demolish several of the old seminary buildings for the construction of a new residence for retired Vincentians. The Apostle of Charity Residence opened in 2006.

== Gallery ==
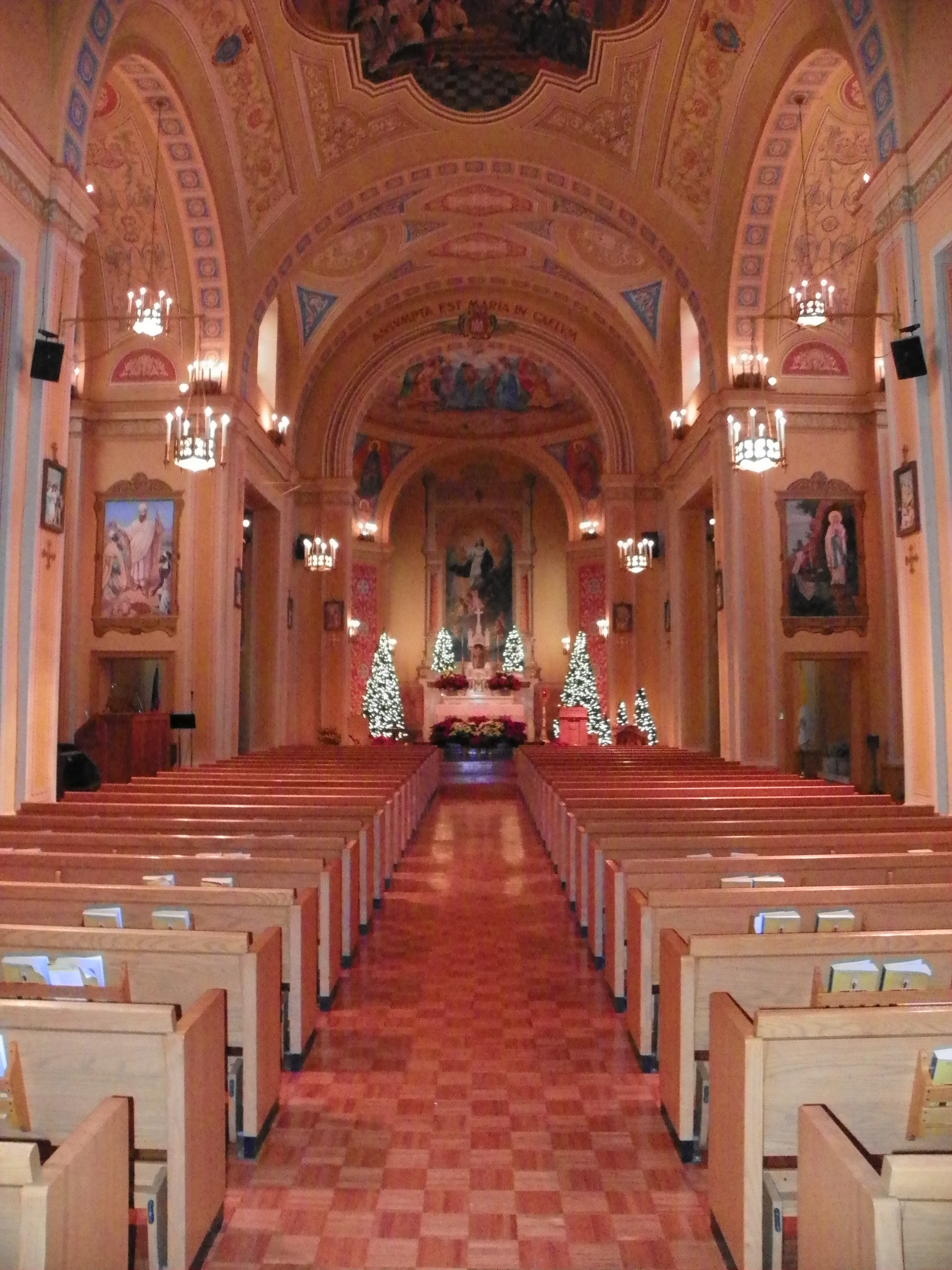
Interior view

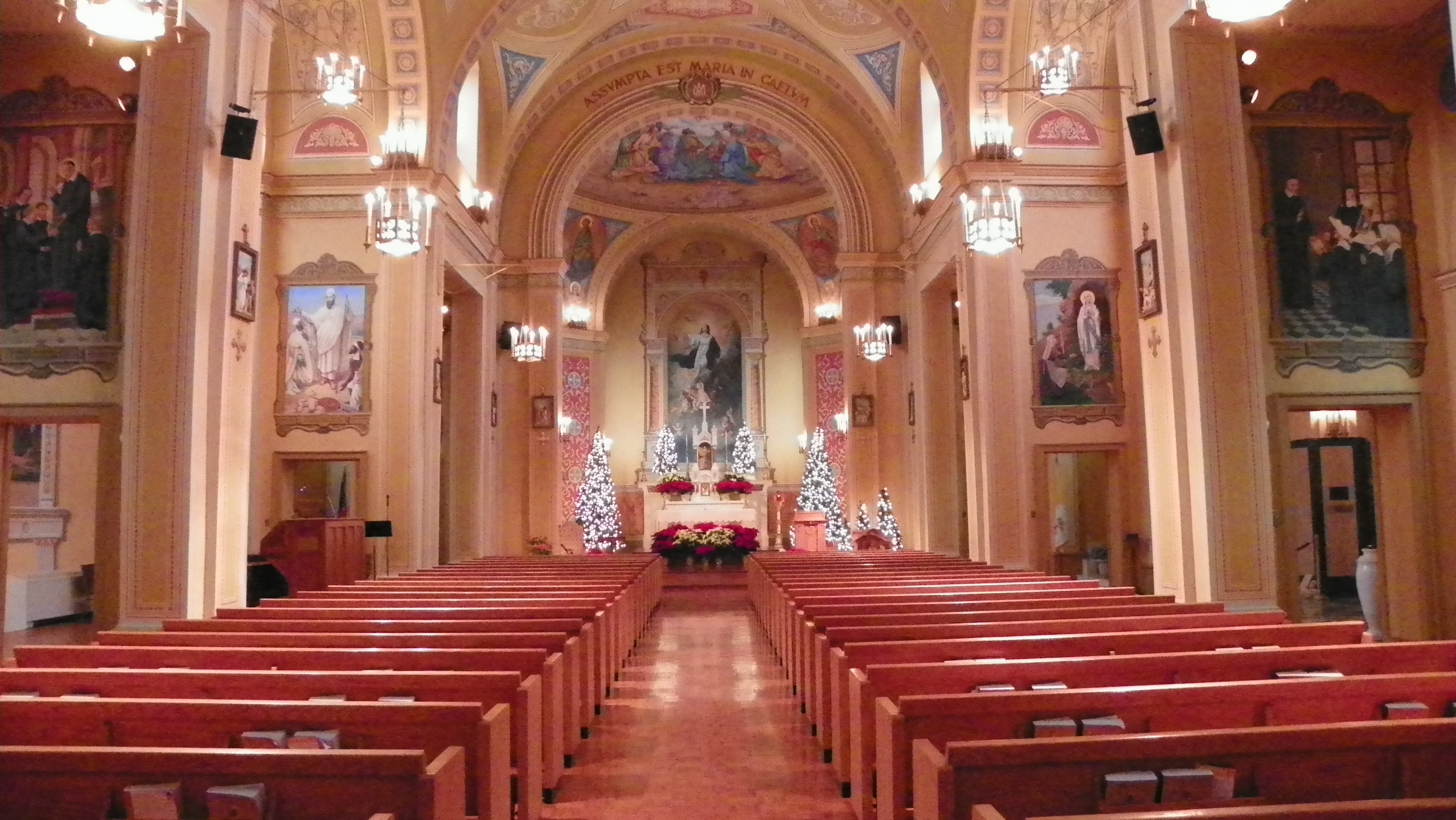
Interior with aisle

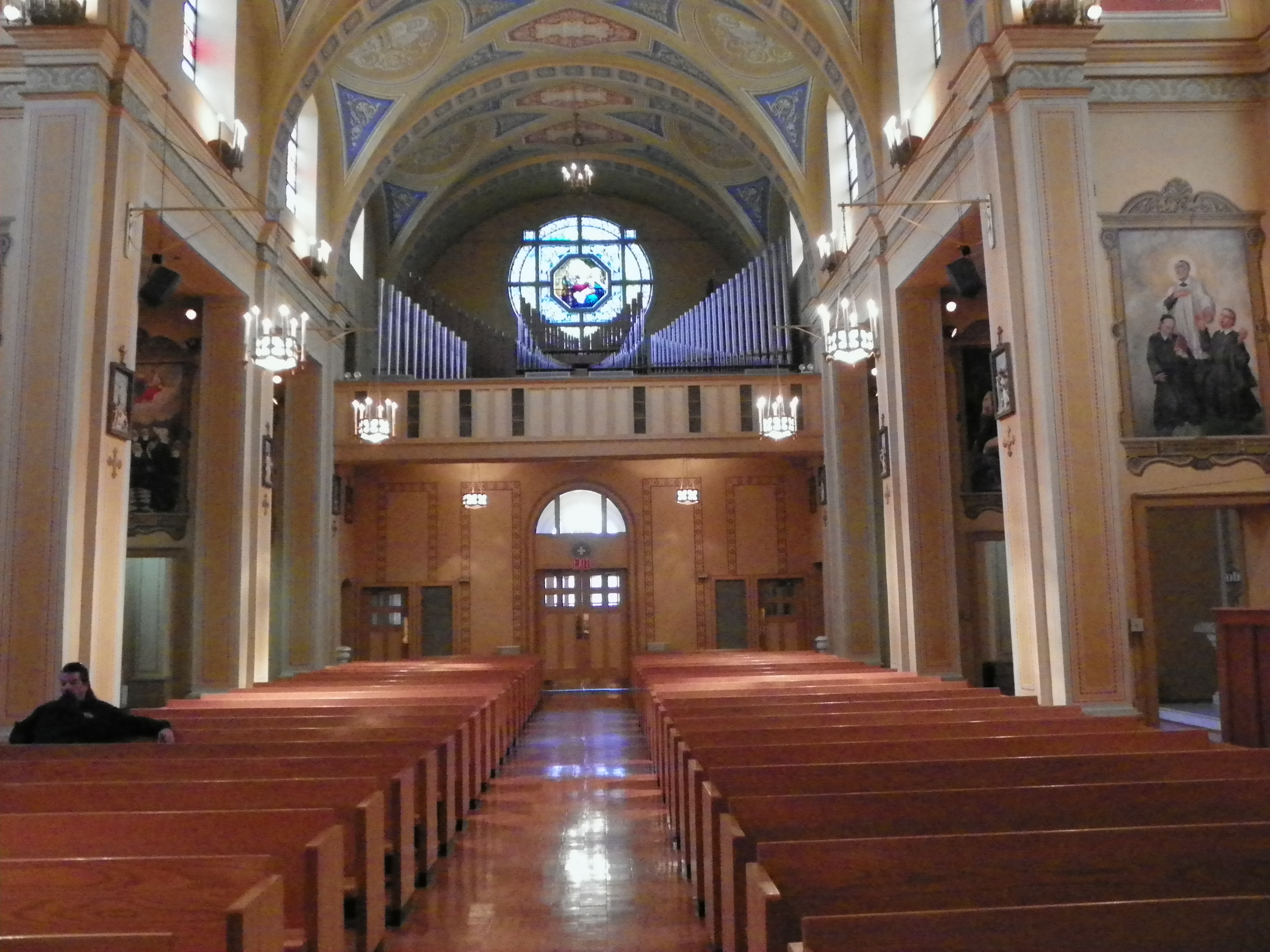
Interior with organ

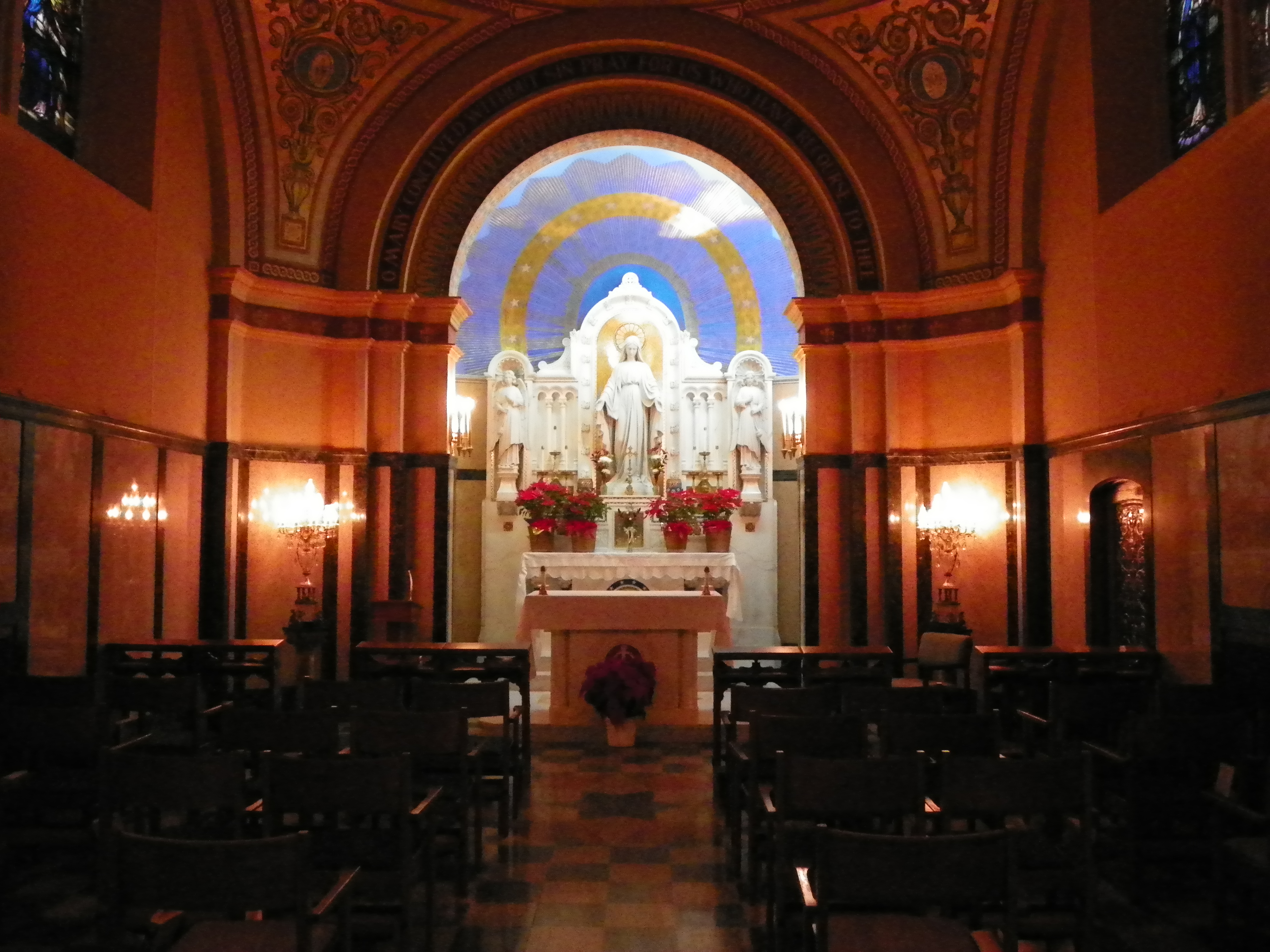
Shrine

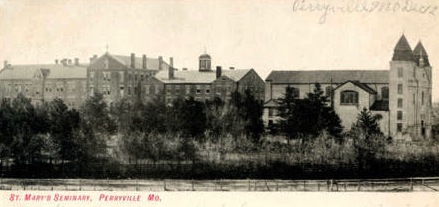
St. Mary's (Assumption) Church (right) and Seminary

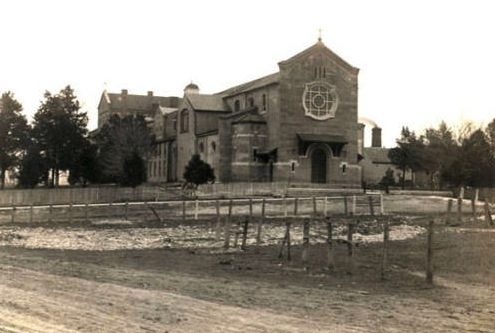
St. Mary's 1913
