= Sisters of the Precious Blood (Baden) =

The Sisters of the Precious Blood is a Roman Catholic female religious order founded in 1845 in Steinerberg, Switzerland by Magdalene Weber and a number of young women from Baden.

== History ==
Young women from Baden, Germany, joined together for the perpetual adoration of the Most Precious Blood in the Blessed Sacrament, under the guidance of Karl Rolfus. The group began as a contemplative community. One of their number made a pilgrimage to the Marian shrine in Einsiedeln, Switzerland, and to the nearby St. Anne Shrine in Steinerberg. As at that time, under the Kulturkampf's anti-Catholic laws, religious communities in Germany were not allowed by the government to accept new members, Magdalene Weber led twelve of them to relocate in Switzerland. The Sisters of the Most Precious Blood was then founded in Steinerberg on September 8, 1845, as a contemplative community. However, as Swiss law prohibited all strictly contemplative orders, they developed an apostolic character, as well. In the spring of 1848, the community re-located to Ottmarsheim, in the French Alsace region, where, as they were from Germany, they were precluded from teaching and so became contemplative once more.

In 1857, Herman Kessler, pastor of Gurtweil, Baden, who had long desired to establish a home for destitute children and a normal school for the training of religious teachers, asked for six members of the community of the Sisters of the Precious Blood from Ottmarsheim, Alsace. They responded and began their work with twelve poor children under the direction of Kessler. Under the auspices of Hermann von Vicari, the archbishop of Freiburg, a novitiate and normal school were established; the latter was affiliated with the educational department of Karlsruhe. Other schools and academies were opened. At Gurtweil, the Sisters taught students to make vestments, the beginning of their ecclesiastical art ministry. In 1860, the congregation split, the contemplative sisters in Ottmarsheim, and the more apostolic in Gurtweil.

With anti-Catholic sentiment growing in Germany, American bishops offered the opportunity to minister to newly arrived German immigrants. In 1868 Henry Damian Juncker, the bishop of Alton, Illinois, asked for Sisters for his diocese. In 1870 a number of them sailed for Belle Prairie (named Piopolis in 1877) in the Diocese of Alton, arriving on March 2. Meantime Peter Joseph Baltes succeeded Junker as bishop; he entrusted to them several parochial school and promised further assistance on condition that the community should establish itself permanently in his diocese subject to his authority. The superior of the community returned to Germany to present the matter to their motherhouse.

In September 1871, Augusta Volk, superior of the motherhouse at Gurtweil, and twelve more Sisters arrived in Springfield. Volk was apprehensive of a premature separation from Gurtweil, and was also opposed to limiting the Sisters' activity to one diocese only. She went to St. Louis, where, through the efforts of Henry Muehlsiepen, Vicar General of the Archdiocese of St. Louis, the Sisters of the Precious Blood were received into the archdiocese (1872) and obtained charge of a number of schools in Missouri and Nebraska.

== Sisters of the Most Precious Blood (CPPS) ==
In the autumn of 1872, another fourteen sisters from Gurtweil arrived at the novitiate established in Belle Prairie. To make room for them, twenty sisters relocated to St. Louis, where Herman Leygraff, pastor of St. Agatha's, had provided a home for the sisters until a motherhouse could be built.

In 1873 the Kulturkampf had reached its climax and the entire community was expelled from Germany; some went to Rome, others settled in Bosnia, Hungary. In September, Muehlsiepen met forty-nine sisters in New York and conducted them to St. Louis, where the new Motherhouse in O'Fallon, Missouri was completed by July, 1875.

The O'Fallon community re-organized with a new rule and constitution and was incorporated in 1878 under the laws of the State of Missouri with the legal title of St. Mary's Institute of O'Fallon, Missouri. Augusta Volk is considered the founder of the congregation. A new novitiate was begun in O'Fallon. The O'Fallon Sisters became a congregation of pontifical right in 1918 and uses the post-nominals CPPS. As of 2019, there were about 100 sisters in the O'Fallon congregation.

== Adorers of the Blood of Christ (ASC) ==
With the establishment of the motherhouse in O'Fallon, the congregation split once again. Clementine Zerr, with ten professed sisters and a number of novices at Belle Prairie, chose to maintain affiliation with the Precious Blood Congregation in Rome. They relocated to Ruma, Illinois, where they established the first U.S. motherhouse for the Adorers of the Blood of Christ. A second province was established in Wichita, Kansas in 1929; and a third, by Bosnian sisters, in Columbia, Pennsylvania. In 2000, they united to form the United States Region of the Adorers of the Blood of Christ.
