= Perryville, Missouri =

City in Missouri, U.S.

- City
- Perry County Courthouse Perryville Higher Education Center St. Mary of the Barrens

- Location of Perryville, Missouri
- Coordinates: 37°43′41″N 89°51′40″W
- Country: United States
- State: Missouri
- County: Perry
- Township: Central
- Incorporated: 1856

Government
  - Mayor: Larry Riney

Area
  - Total: 8.32 sq mi (21.56 km^{2})
  - Land: 8.16 sq mi (21.14 km^{2})
  - Water: 0.17 sq mi (0.43 km^{2})
- Elevation: 577 ft (176 m)

Population (2020)
  - Total: 8,555
  - Density: 1,048.4/sq mi (404.78/km^{2})
- Time zone: UTC-6 (Central (CST))
  - Summer (DST): UTC-5 (CDT)
- ZIP codes: 63775, 63776, 63783
- Area code: 573
- FIPS code: 29-57116
- GNIS feature ID: 2396186
- Website: https://www.cityofperryville.com
- Perryville has a Mayfest once a year

Perryville is a city in and the county seat of Perry County, Missouri, United States. The population was 8,555 at the 2020 United States census.

== History ==
Perryville was selected the county seat of Perry County by Robert T. Brown, Joseph Tucker, and Thomas Riney, who had been appointed to select the seat of justice. In 1821, Bernard Layton deeded 51 acres (210,000 m^{2}) to the commissioners in exchange for one town lot. Fifty-three of the 99 town lots were sold for $1,486.25, which was used to build the first courthouse. The current courthouse is the third such structure. It was built in 1904 at a cost of $30,000. Perryville and Perry County were named for Commodore Oliver Hazard Perry, Naval hero of the War of 1812.

An early store in Perryville was a log structure built by Jean Ferdinand Rozier on the north side of the square. An extant two-story brick building was built in 1830. The upper story serves as the first town hall. Perryville was first incorporated in 1837, but the incorporation was allowed to lapse.

As both merchandisers and consumers grew in sophistication, so did the types of establishments in the county. Built in 1843, the Hoose Hotel, often called the "white house", was a prominent structure in early commercial days. The Hoose Hotel served as a hotel, a brewery and an auction block.

In 1856, the town was again incorporated and by 1874 it had its first fire engine. Fourth Class City status was attained in 1879 and the following year Charles A. Weber was elected its first mayor. With the building of the Chester, Perryville and Ste. Genevieve Railway, prosperity came.

Largely because of its role as the seat of county government and because of its central location, Perryville began to develop as the major commercial and service center in Perry County. The population increased from 897 in 1890 to 1275 in 1900. Telephone service started in 1893.

=== 2017 tornado ===
On February 28, 2017, a deadly EF4 tornado struck the outskirts of Perryville, causing widespread EF3 and some EF4 damage in and around the city, as well in rural Perry County. One man was killed as he was driving southbound on I-55.

== Geography ==
Perryville is located in central Perry County approximately seven miles from the Mississippi River. Cinque Hommes Creek flows past the south side of the city. I-55 and U.S. Route 61 pass on the west and east sides of the city respectively.

According to the United States Census Bureau, the city has a total area of 7.96 square miles (20.62 km^{2}), of which 7.80 square miles (20.20 km^{2}) is land and 0.16 square miles (0.41 km^{2}) is water.

=== Climate ===
Climate data for Perryville Water Treatment Plant, Missouri (1991–2020 normals, extremes 1907–present)
Month	Jan	Feb	Mar	Apr	May	Jun	Jul	Aug	Sep	Oct	Nov	Dec	Year
Record high °F (°C)	74 (23)	83 (28)	89 (32)	92 (33)	98 (37)	110 (43)	108 (42)	109 (43)	104 (40)	96 (36)	86 (30)	78 (26)	110 (43)
Mean maximum °F (°C)	64.0 (17.8)	70.0 (21.1)	77.7 (25.4)	83.3 (28.5)	88.9 (31.6)	94.6 (34.8)	97.8 (36.6)	97.2 (36.2)	92.8 (33.8)	85.3 (29.6)	74.5 (23.6)	64.6 (18.1)	99.7 (37.6)
Mean daily maximum °F (°C)	41.0 (5.0)	46.2 (7.9)	56.1 (13.4)	67.5 (19.7)	76.5 (24.7)	85.2 (29.6)	88.3 (31.3)	87.2 (30.7)	80.7 (27.1)	69.6 (20.9)	55.6 (13.1)	44.8 (7.1)	66.6 (19.2)
Daily mean °F (°C)	31.2 (−0.4)	35.4 (1.9)	44.4 (6.9)	54.8 (12.7)	64.7 (18.2)	73.8 (23.2)	77.2 (25.1)	75.3 (24.1)	67.8 (19.9)	56.4 (13.6)	44.2 (6.8)	35.1 (1.7)	55.0 (12.8)
Mean daily minimum °F (°C)	21.3 (−5.9)	24.6 (−4.1)	32.7 (0.4)	42.1 (5.6)	52.8 (11.6)	62.3 (16.8)	66.1 (18.9)	63.5 (17.5)	54.8 (12.7)	43.3 (6.3)	32.9 (0.5)	25.4 (−3.7)	43.5 (6.4)
Mean minimum °F (°C)	1.4 (−17.0)	6.9 (−13.9)	15.2 (−9.3)	27.4 (−2.6)	37.8 (3.2)	49.1 (9.5)	54.8 (12.7)	52.4 (11.3)	39.5 (4.2)	27.4 (−2.6)	18.1 (−7.7)	8.2 (−13.2)	−2.6 (−19.2)
Record low °F (°C)	−16 (−27)	−19 (−28)	0 (−18)	17 (−8)	28 (−2)	37 (3)	38 (3)	35 (2)	29 (−2)	4 (−16)	−5 (−21)	−13 (−25)	−19 (−28)
Average precipitation inches (mm)	2.74 (70)	2.77 (70)	3.82 (97)	5.53 (140)	5.71 (145)	4.34 (110)	3.93 (100)	3.33 (85)	3.33 (85)	3.39 (86)	4.18 (106)	3.16 (80)	46.23 (1,174)
Average snowfall inches (cm)	1.3 (3.3)	1.7 (4.3)	0.5 (1.3)	0.0 (0.0)	0.0 (0.0)	0.0 (0.0)	0.0 (0.0)	0.0 (0.0)	0.0 (0.0)	0.0 (0.0)	0.1 (0.25)	1.1 (2.8)	4.7 (12)
Average precipitation days (≥ 0.01 in)	5.7	5.9	8.6	9.3	10.9	7.6	7.6	7.0	6.1	6.8	7.5	6.8	89.8
Average snowy days (≥ 0.1 in)	0.7	0.8	0.2	0.0	0.0	0.0	0.0	0.0	0.0	0.0	0.1	0.6	2.4
Source: NOAA

== Demographics ==
Historical population
Census	Pop.	Note	%±
1850	177		—
1860	336		89.8%
1870	501		49.1%
1880	754		50.5%
1890	875		16.0%
1900	1,275		45.7%
1910	1,708		34.0%
1920	1,763		3.2%
1930	2,964		68.1%
1940	3,907		31.8%
1950	4,591		17.5%
1960	5,117		11.5%
1970	5,149		0.6%
1980	7,343		42.6%
1990	6,933		−5.6%
2000	7,667		10.6%
2010	8,225		7.3%
2020	8,555		4.0%
U.S. Decennial Census

=== 2020 census ===
As of the 2020 census, Perryville had a population of 8,555. The median age was 39.6 years. 23.8% of residents were under the age of 18 and 19.8% of residents were 65 years of age or older. For every 100 females there were 95.0 males, and for every 100 females age 18 and over there were 93.2 males age 18 and over.

93.6% of residents lived in urban areas, while 6.4% lived in rural areas.

There were 3,483 households in Perryville, of which 29.8% had children under the age of 18 living in them. Of all households, 41.2% were married-couple households, 20.2% were households with a male householder and no spouse or partner present, and 29.3% were households with a female householder and no spouse or partner present. About 33.0% of all households were made up of individuals and 14.9% had someone living alone who was 65 years of age or older.

There were 3,736 housing units, of which 6.8% were vacant. The homeowner vacancy rate was 1.8% and the rental vacancy rate was 8.4%.

Racial composition as of the 2020 census
Race	Number	Percent
White	7,725	90.3%
Black or African American	81	0.9%
American Indian and Alaska Native	26	0.3%
Asian	100	1.2%
Native Hawaiian and Other Pacific Islander	0	0.0%
Some other race	154	1.8%
Two or more races	469	5.5%
Hispanic or Latino (of any race)	293	3.4%

=== Income and poverty ===
The 2016–2020 5-year American Community Survey estimates show that the median household income was $51,601 (with a margin of error of +/- $3,622) and the median family income was $74,393 (+/- $11,149). Males had a median income of $40,898 (+/- $7,484) versus $23,831 (+/- $3,006) for females. The median income for those above 16 years old was $31,694 (+/- $2,690). Approximately, 9.9% of families and 12.8% of the population were below the poverty line, including 13.8% of those under the age of 18 and 4.3% of those ages 65 or over.

=== 2010 census ===
As of the census of 2010, there were 8,225 people, 3,288 households, and 2,078 families living in the city. The population density was 1,054.5 inhabitants per square mile (407.1/km^{2}). There were 3,588 housing units at an average density of 460.0 per square mile (177.6/km^{2}). The racial makeup of the city was 95.33% White, 0.75% Black or African American, 0.39% Native American, 0.90% Asian, 0.07% Native Hawaiian or Pacific Islander, 1.28% from other races, and 1.28% from two or more races. Hispanic or Latino of any race were 2.69% of the population.

There were 3,288 households, of which 33.3% had children under the age of 18 living with them, 45.5% were married couples living together, 12.3% had a female householder with no husband present, 5.4% had a male householder with no wife present, and 36.8% were non-families. 31.1% of all households were made up of individuals, and 14.4% had someone living alone who was 65 years of age or older. The average household size was 2.42 and the average family size was 3.00.

The median age in the city was 36.5 years. 25.4% of residents were under the age of 18; 8.4% were between the ages of 18 and 24; 25.6% were from 25 to 44; 22.9% were from 45 to 64; and 17.7% were 65 years of age or older. The gender makeup of the city was 47.7% male and 52.3% female.

=== 2000 census ===
As of the census of 2000, there were 7,667 people, 3,031 households, and 1,991 families living in the city. The population density was 1,010.3 inhabitants per square mile (390.1/km^{2}). There were 3,284 housing units at an average density of 432.7 per square mile (167.1/km^{2}). The racial makeup of the city was 97.47% White, 1.32% Asian, 0.25% African American, 0.17% Native American, 0.01% Pacific Islander, 0.16% from other races, and 0.63% from two or more races. Hispanic or Latino of any race were 0.70% of the population.

There were 3,031 households, out of which 31.7% had children under the age of 18 living with them, 51.4% were married couples living together, 11.2% had a female householder with no husband present, and 34.3% were non-families. 30.4% of all households were made up of individuals, and 15.6% had someone living alone who was 65 years of age or older. The average household size was 2.41 and the average family size was 3.00.

In the city the population was spread out, with 24.6% under the age of 18, 9.2% from 18 to 24, 28.2% from 25 to 44, 18.5% from 45 to 64, and 19.5% who were 65 years of age or older. The median age was 37 years. For every 100 females there were 89.7 males. For every 100 females age 18 and over, there were 86.9 males.

The median income for a household in the city was $33,934, and the median income for a family was $43,072. Males had a median income of $27,115 versus $19,736 for females. The per capita income for the city was $16,630. About 5.9% of families and 11.0% of the population were below the poverty line, including 10.6% of those under age 18 and 15.9% of those age 65 or over.

== Economy ==
Two of the largest employers in the city are TG Missouri, a division of Toyoda Gosei, and Gilster-Mary Lee.

Manufacturers in Perryville include:

- Gilster-Mary Lee Corporation, which has as 125,000-square-foot (11,600 m^{2}) baking mix plant and a 185,000-square-foot (17,200 m^{2}) breakfast cereal plant. Also in the Perryville area are
- Sabreliner Corporation, a company which provides maintenance and overhauling for both military and business jet aircraft engines;
- Seguin Moreau, a French wine barrel manufacturer, that mills barrel staves and heads from Perry County's white oak forests to supply its cooperage in Napa, California. The cooperage uses the wood it gets from Perry County to produce American oak wine barrels for the international wine industry; and
- TG Missouri Corporation, a subsidiary of the Japanese company Toyoda Gosei, manufactures airbags, steering wheels and interior trim pieces for automobile manufacturers, most notably Toyota.
- BBL Buildings and Components and Stark Truss, both of whom manufacture building trusses for commercial and residential construction.

== Arts and culture ==
=== Festivals ===
Two festivals are held annually in Perryville, Mayfest which is held on the courthouse square in May, and the St. Vincent de Paul Seminary Picnic which is held on the seminary fairgrounds each August.

=== Historic sites ===
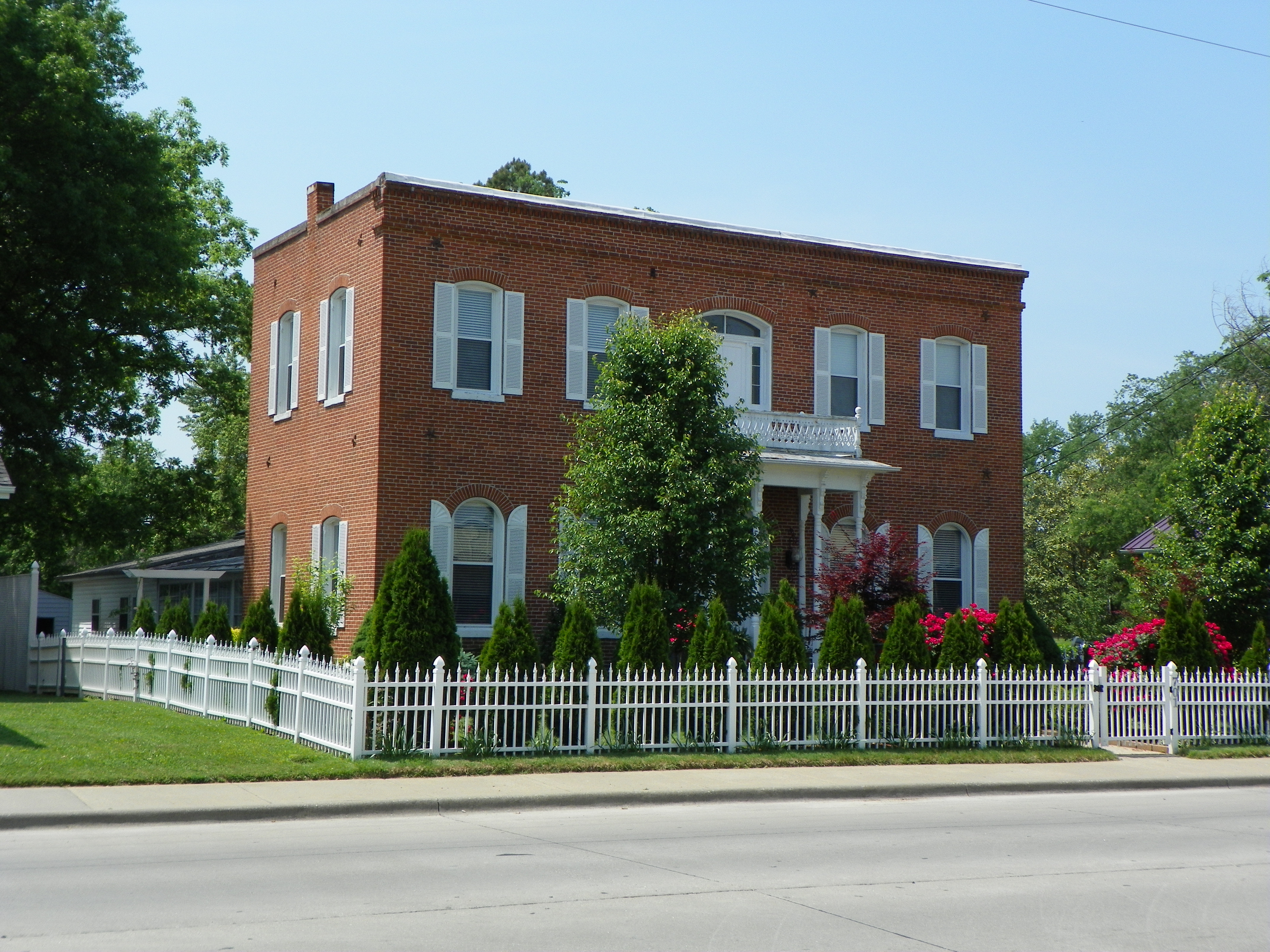
Shelby–Nicholson–Schindler House

Three sites listed on the National Register of Historic Places are located in Perryville, including the Doerr–Brown House, St. Mary's of the Barrens Catholic Church, and the Shelby–Nicholson–Schindler House.

=== Churches ===
Perryville is home to a number of churches, of which three of the largest churches are St. Vincent de Paul Roman Catholic Church, St. Mary's of the Barrens Roman Catholic Church, Immanuel Lutheran Church, the First Presbyterian Church, First Baptist Church, Calvary Baptist Church, United Methodist Church, Agape Christian Assembly of God Church, First Assembly of God Church, Christ of Christ.

== Parks and recreation ==
The Perry Park Center, located in the city park, features an aquatics center, gymnasium, performing arts center, movie theatre, library, and sports facilities.

== Government ==
Perryville has a mayor/city council form of government. The mayor is Larry Riney. The city council consists of six aldermen, two from each of three wards. Each is elected for two-year terms.

== Education ==
Perryville is served by Perry County School District No. 32 (PK-12) as well as two private parochial school systems: St. Vincent dePaul Catholic School (including St. Vincent High School) and Immanuel Lutheran School (PK-8).

Perryville has a public library, a branch of the Riverside Regional Library.

== Infrastructure ==
The 880th Engineer Team (HAUL) of the Missouri Army National Guard is based in Perryville.

Mercy Perry Hospital is the health provider for the city and county.

== Notable people ==
- Steve Bieser, Major League Baseball player and college baseball coach
- Arthur D. Bond, father of former governor Kit Bond, a PHS graduate
- Bill Cissell, Major League Baseball player
- Chris Janson, Country singer
- Charles Edward Kiefner – Adjunct General for the State of Missouri
- Kenneth Knox, former Southeast Missouri State University football coach
- Raymond H. Littge, World War II flying ace
- John William Noell, politician
- Thomas E. Noell, politician
- John T. Richardson, priest and President of DePaul University
- Rocio Romero, designer
- Joseph Rosati, opened St. Mary's of the Barrens Catholic Church in 1818
- Bill Schindler, Major League Baseball player
- Steven Tilley, former Speaker of the Missouri House of Representatives

== See also ==
- List of cities in Missouri
