= Zion Evangelical Lutheran Church =

Zion Evangelical Lutheran Church may refer to:

- Zion Evangelical Church (Evansville, Indiana), a National Register of Historic Places listing in Vanderburgh County, Indiana
- Zion Evangelical Lutheran Church (Petoskey, Michigan), a National Register of Historic Places listing in Emmet County, Michigan
- Zion Evangelical Lutheran Church (Saddle River, New Jersey), listed on the NRHP in Bergen County, New Jersey
- Zion Evangelical Lutheran Church (Flourtown, Pennsylvania)
- Zion Evangelical Lutheran Church (Hartland, Wisconsin)
- Zion Evangelical Lutheran Church and Parsonage, Columbus, Wisconsin
- Zion Evangelical Lutheran Church (Lunenburg), Nova Scotia
- Zion Evangelical Lutheran Church (Chicago)

== See also ==
- Zion Church (disambiguation)
- Zion Evangelical Lutheran Church Cemetery, Speedwell, Virginia
- Zion Lutheran Church (disambiguation)
