= Zion Lutheran Church =

Zion Lutheran Church may refer to:

United States:

- Zion Lutheran Church (Stamford, Connecticut), listed on the National Register of Historic Places (NRHP)
- Zion Lutheran Church (Baltimore, Maryland), NRHP-listed
- Zion Lutheran Church (Shelly, Minnesota), NRHP-listed
- Zion Lutheran Church (Crosstown, Missouri)
- Zion Lutheran Church (Jefferson City, Missouri), NRHP-listed
- Zion Lutheran Church (Longtown, Missouri)
- Zion Lutheran Church (Athens, New York), NRHP-listed
- Zion Lutheran Church (Rockwell, North Carolina), NRHP-listed
- Zion Lutheran Church (Cleveland, Ohio), NRHP-listed
- Zion Lutheran Church (Sandusky, Ohio), NRHP-listed
- Zion Lutheran Church (Portland, Oregon), NRHP-listed
- Zion Lutheran Church (East Stroudsburg, Pennsylvania), NRHP-listed
- Zion Lutheran Church and Graveyard, Hummelstown, Pennsylvania, NRHP-listed
- Zion Lutheran Church (Volin, South Dakota), NRHP-listed
- Zion Lutheran Church (Fredericksburg, Texas), a Recorded Texas Historic Landmark
- Zion Lutheran Church (Appleton, Wisconsin), NRHP-listed

Australia:

- Zion Lutheran Church, Byaduk

== See also ==
- German Evangelical Zion Lutheran Church, Harrisburg, Pennsylvania
- Zion Church (disambiguation)
- Zion Evangelical Lutheran Church (disambiguation)
