= Zion Lutheran Church (Crosstown, Missouri) =

Zion Lutheran Church, Crosstown, Missouri
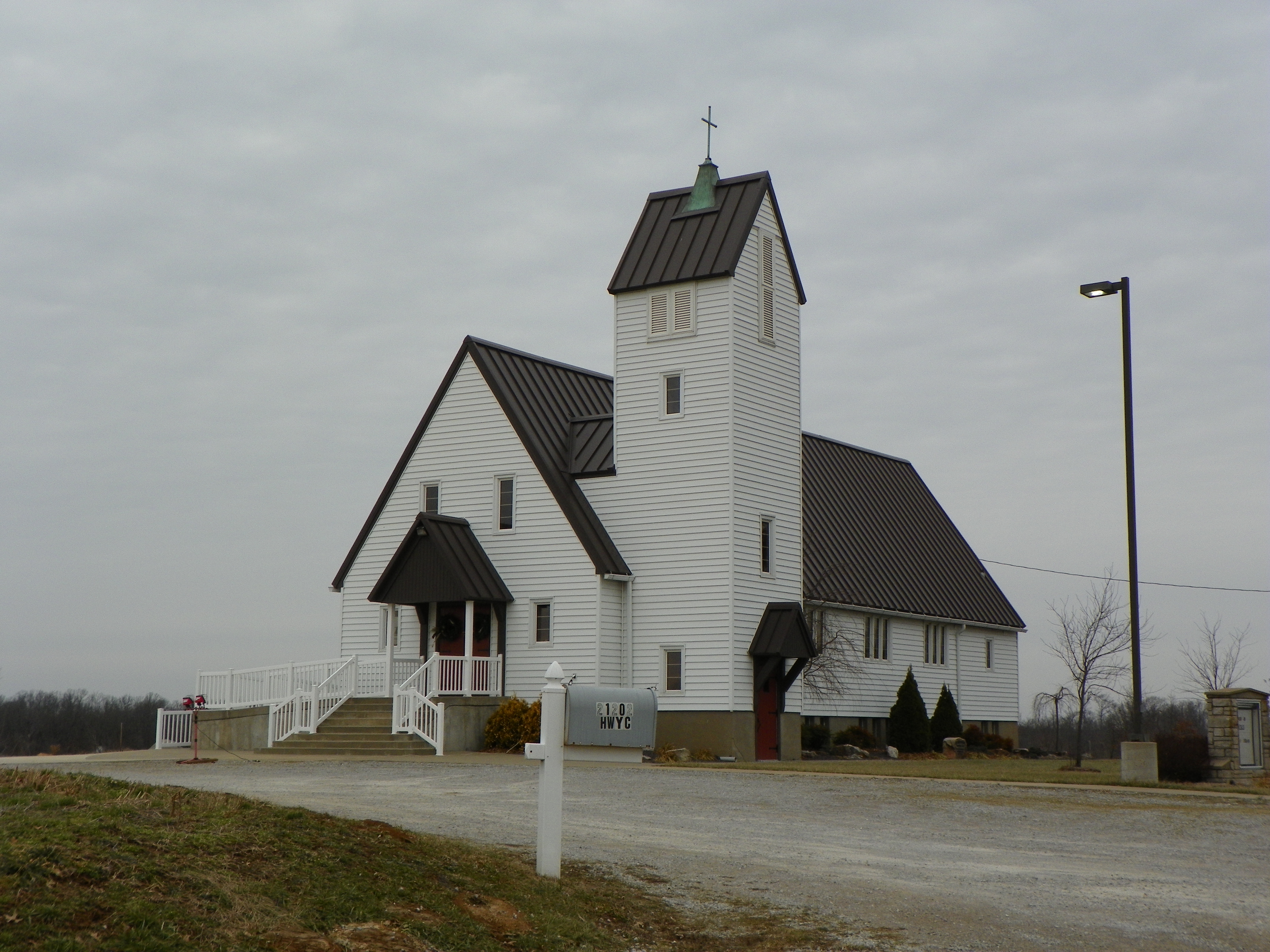

- Location within Missouri
- 37°44′47″N 89°43′40″W
- Location: 21202 Hwy C, Crosstown, Missouri 63775
- Country: United States
- Denomination: Lutheran Church–Missouri Synod

Administration
- District: Missouri District

Zion Lutheran Church is an LCMS (Lutheran Church–Missouri Synod ) church in Crosstown, Missouri.

== 2006 F4 Tornado ==
On September 22, 2006, significant destruction and damage were caused by an F4 tornado. Zion Lutheran Church suffered damage to its roof and windows.

== Gallery ==
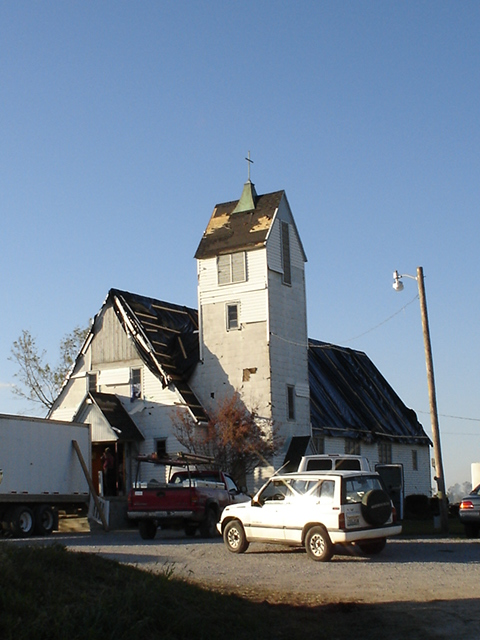
Tornado damage

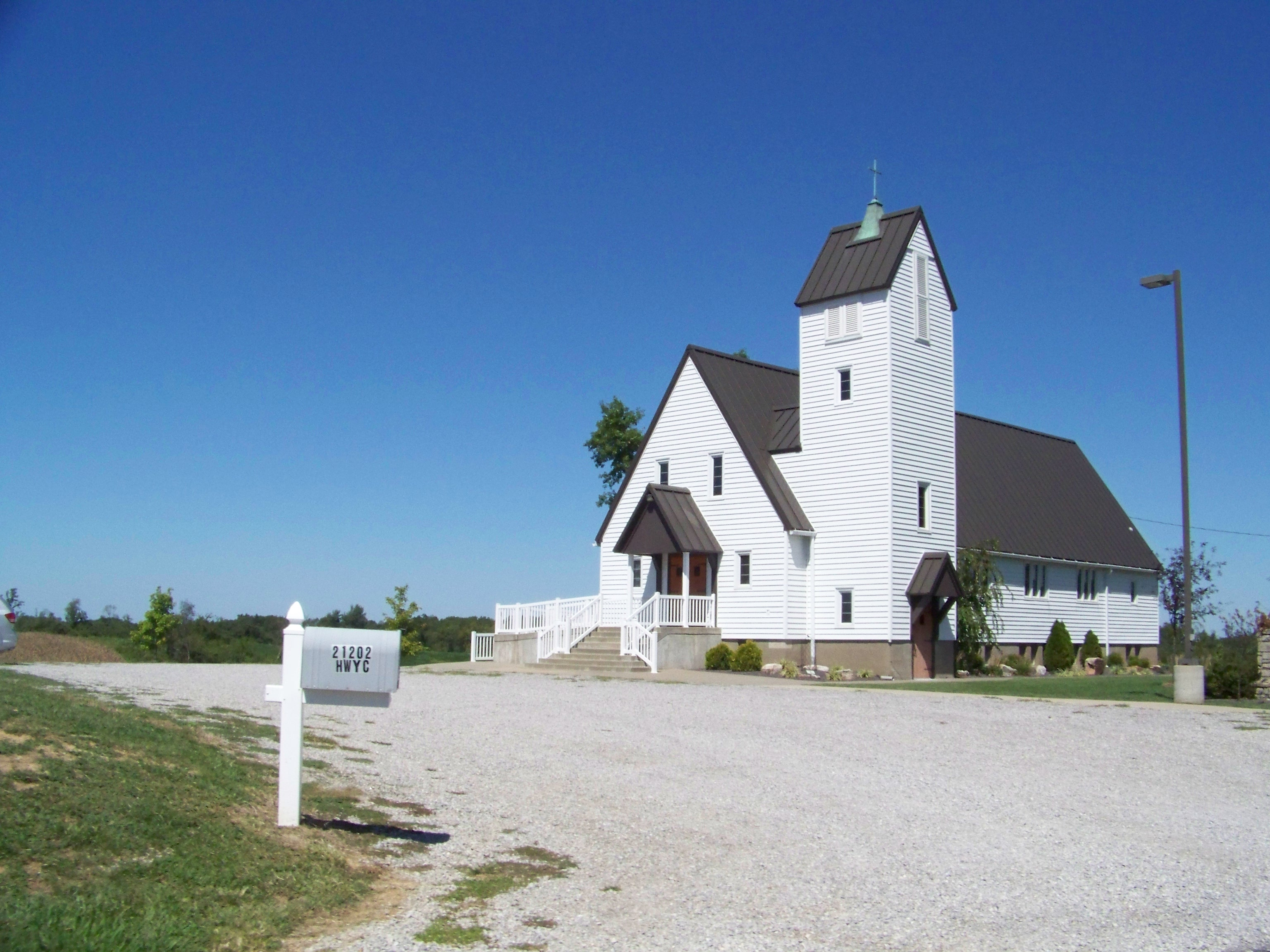
Reconstruction after the tornado

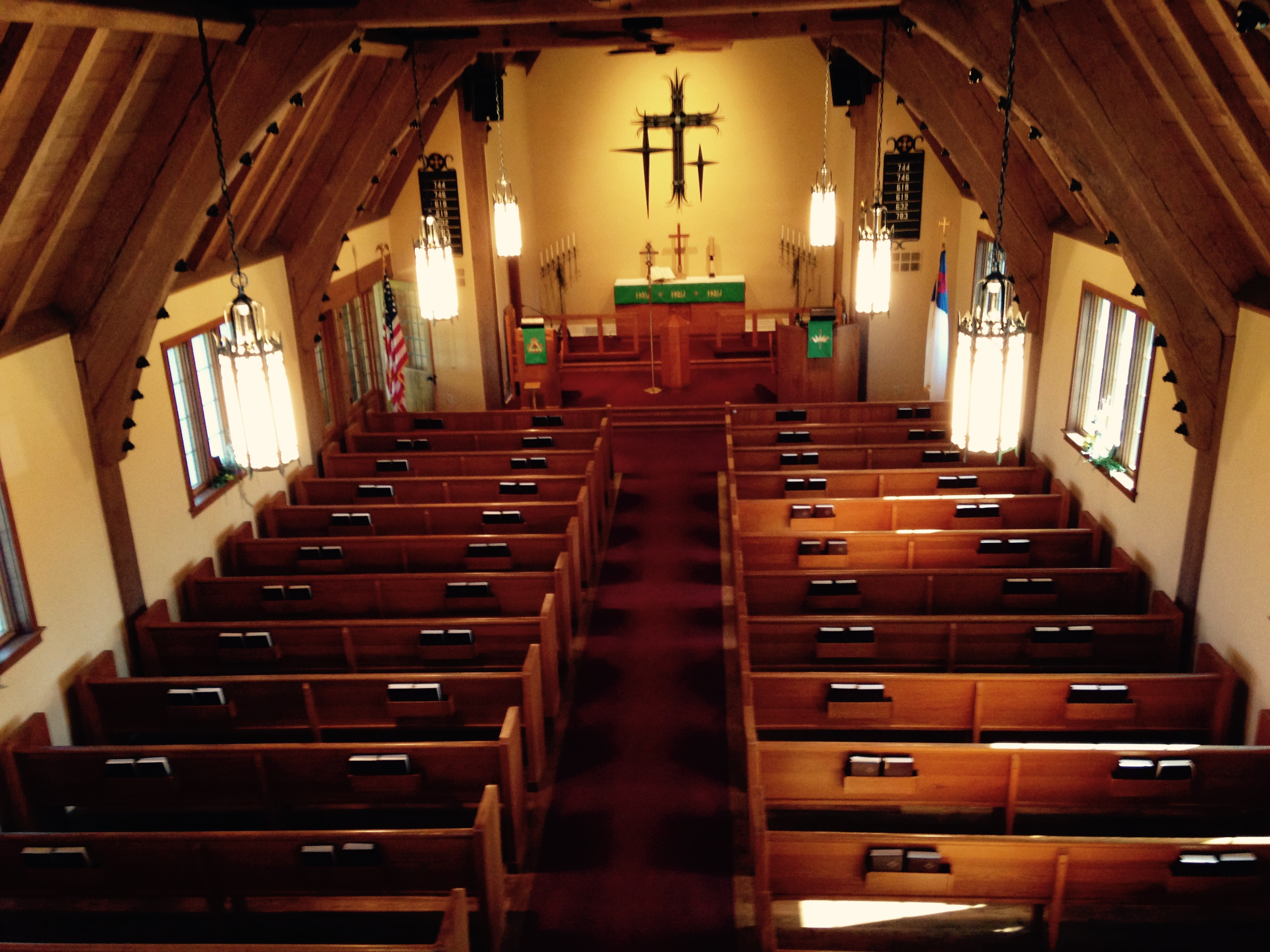
Zion interior

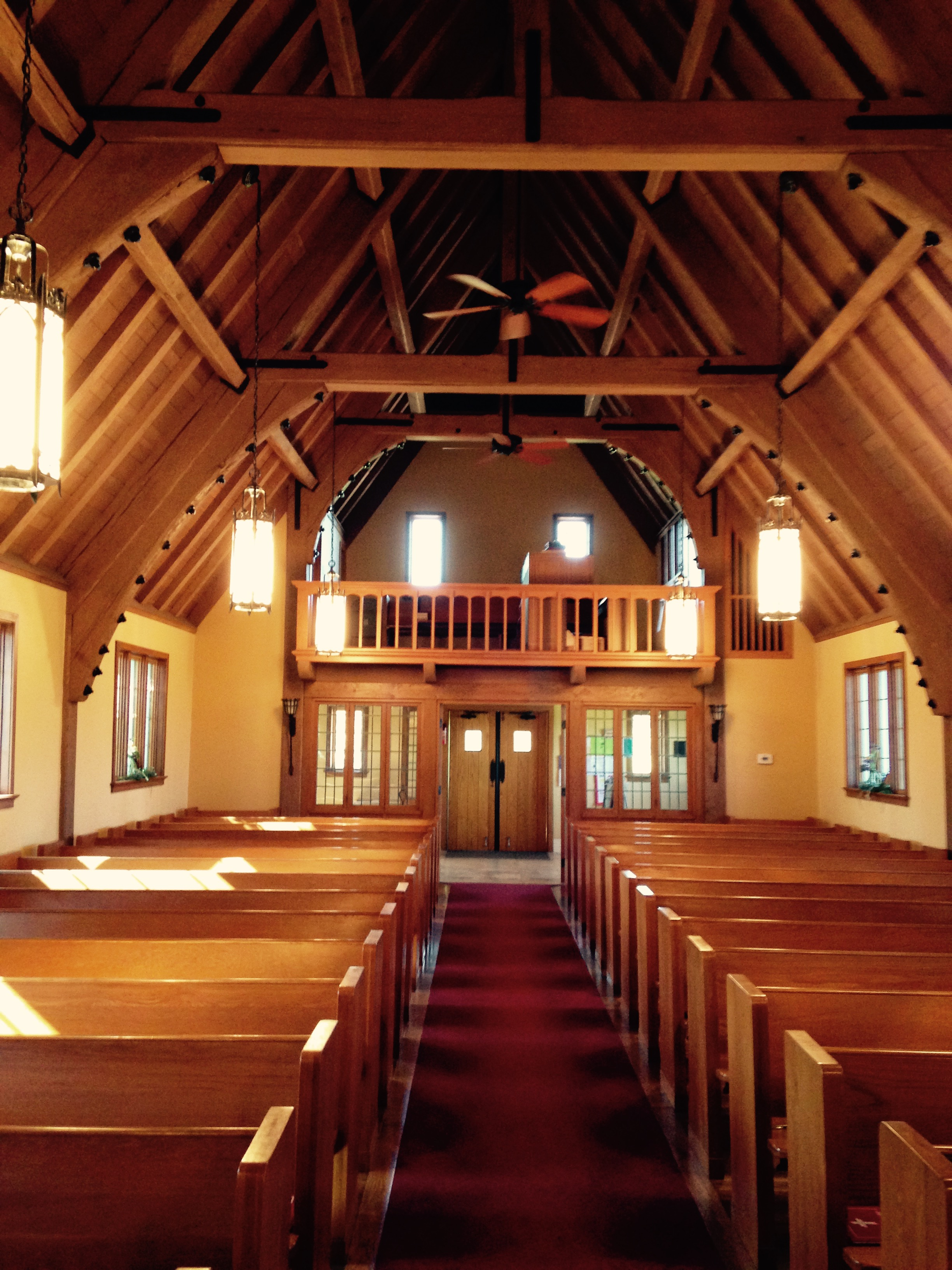
Zion interior
