= Zion Church =

Zion Church may refer to:

== Buildings ==
Germany

- Zion's Church, Worpswede, Lower Saxony

Greenland

- Zion Church, Ilulissat, Greenland

India

- Zion Church, Tharangambadi, Tamil Nadu

Jerusalem

- Church of Zion, Jerusalem, Roman-era church or synagogue on Mount Zion, of which 4th-century remains are visible

United States

- Zion Church (Rome, New York)
- Zion Stone Church, Augustaville, Pennsylvania
- Zion Church (Brownsville, Tennessee)

== Institutions ==
- Zionites (Germany), 18th-century sect in Ronsdorf, Duchy of Berg
- Godbeites (1870-1880s), officially the Church of Zion, a Latter Day Saints grouping
- Christ Community Church in Zion, Illinois (est. 1896), formerly the Christian Catholic Church or Christian Catholic Apostolic Church, an evangelical non-denominational church
- Zionist churches, a group of Christian denominations that derive from the Christian Catholic Apostolic Church of Zion, Illinois, starting with the arrival of Zionist missionaries in South Africa in 1904
- Zion Christian Church of southern Africa (est. 1924), the largest Zionist church
- African Methodist Episcopal Zion Church (est. 1821), a historically African-American Christian denomination in the United States
- Beijing Zion Church (est. 2007)

== See also ==
- Church of Zion (disambiguation)
- Mount Zion Church (disambiguation)
- Zion Baptist Church (disambiguation)
- Zion Evangelical Lutheran Church (disambiguation)
- Zion Lutheran Church (disambiguation)
- Zionism (disambiguation)
- Zion (disambiguation)
