= Church of Zion =

Church of Zion may refer to:

- Church of Zion, Jerusalem, Roman-era church or synagogue on Mount Zion, of which 4th-century remains are visible
- Godbeites, a Latter Day Saints grouping

== See also ==
- Zion Church (disambiguation)
- Mount Zion Church (disambiguation)
- Zionism (disambiguation)
- Zion (disambiguation)
