= Crosstown, Missouri =

- unincorporated community
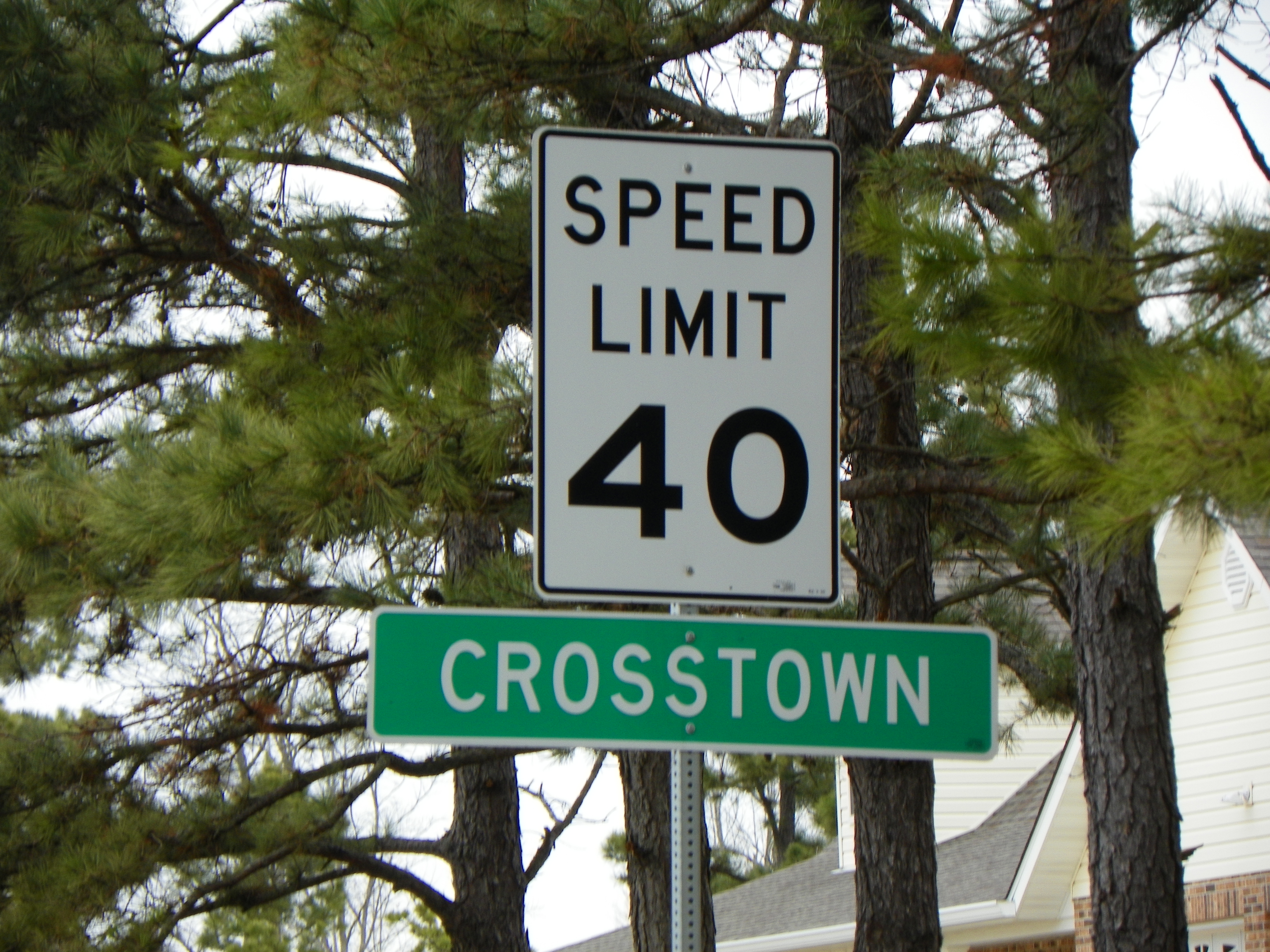
- Crosstown, Missouri, roadsign

- Location of Perry County, Missouri
- Coordinates: 37°44′47″N 89°43′40″W
- Country: United States
- State: Missouri
- County: Perry
- Township: Salem
- Elevation: 564 ft (172 m)
- Time zone: UTC-6 (Central (CST))
  - Summer (DST): UTC-5 (CDT)
- ZIP code: 63775
- Area code: 573
- FIPS code: 29-17560
- GNIS feature ID: 716539

Crosstown is an unincorporated settlement situated in Salem Township in Perry County, Missouri, United States, near the Mississippi River.

== History ==
Crosstown was settled in 1840s as a farming community, but never had a name until a post office was established which was reportedly named for its crossroads location. The post office operated from 1886–1954

It is most notable for being devastated by an F4 tornado on September 22, 2006, although no one was killed.

== Demographics ==
Historical population
Census	Pop.	Note	%±
1940	139		—
1950	66		−52.5%
1960	83		25.8%
1970	66		−20.5%
Missouri Census Data Center

== 2006 Tornado ==
On September 22, 2006, significant destruction and damage were caused by an F4 tornado.

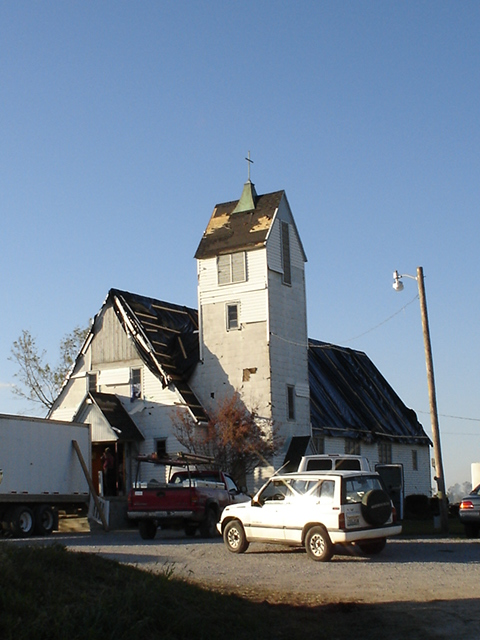
Tornado 2006 damage

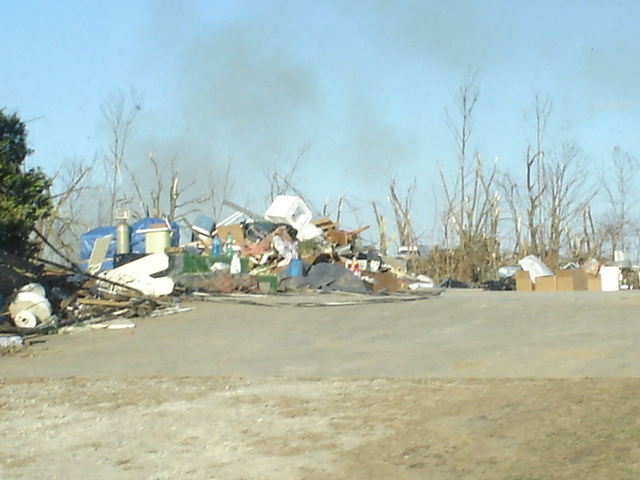
Tornado destruction

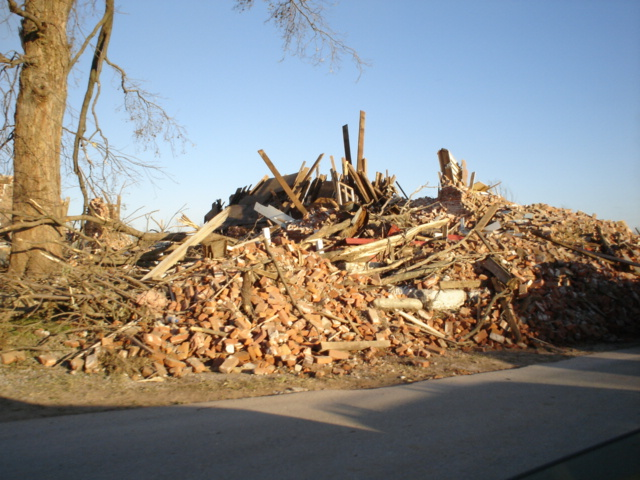
Tornado destruction

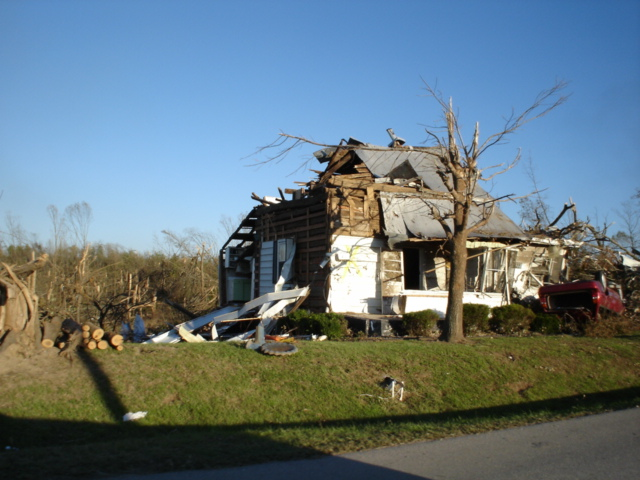
Tornado destruction

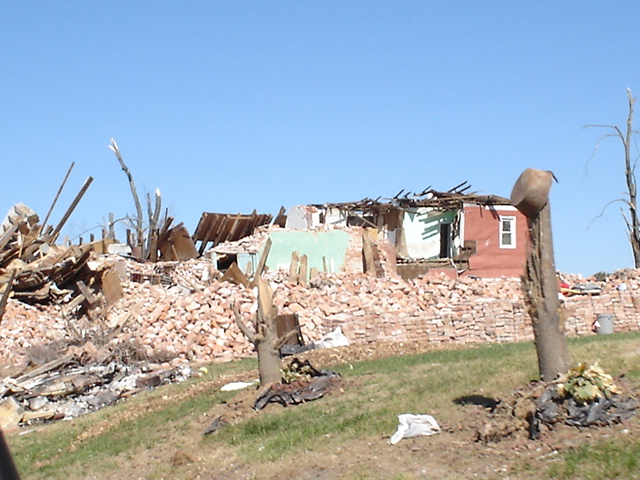
Tornado destruction

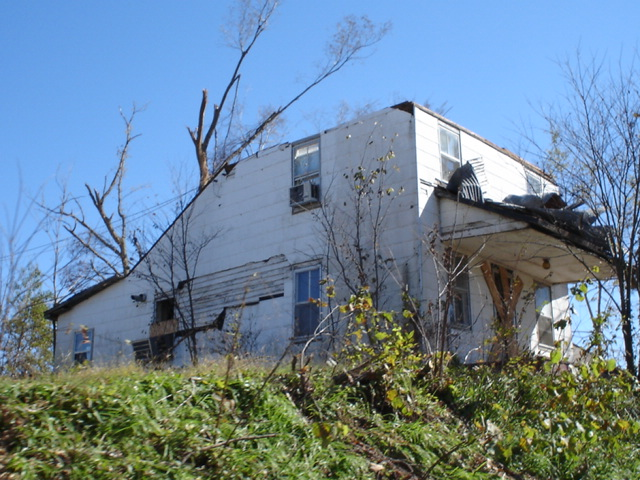
Tornado destruction

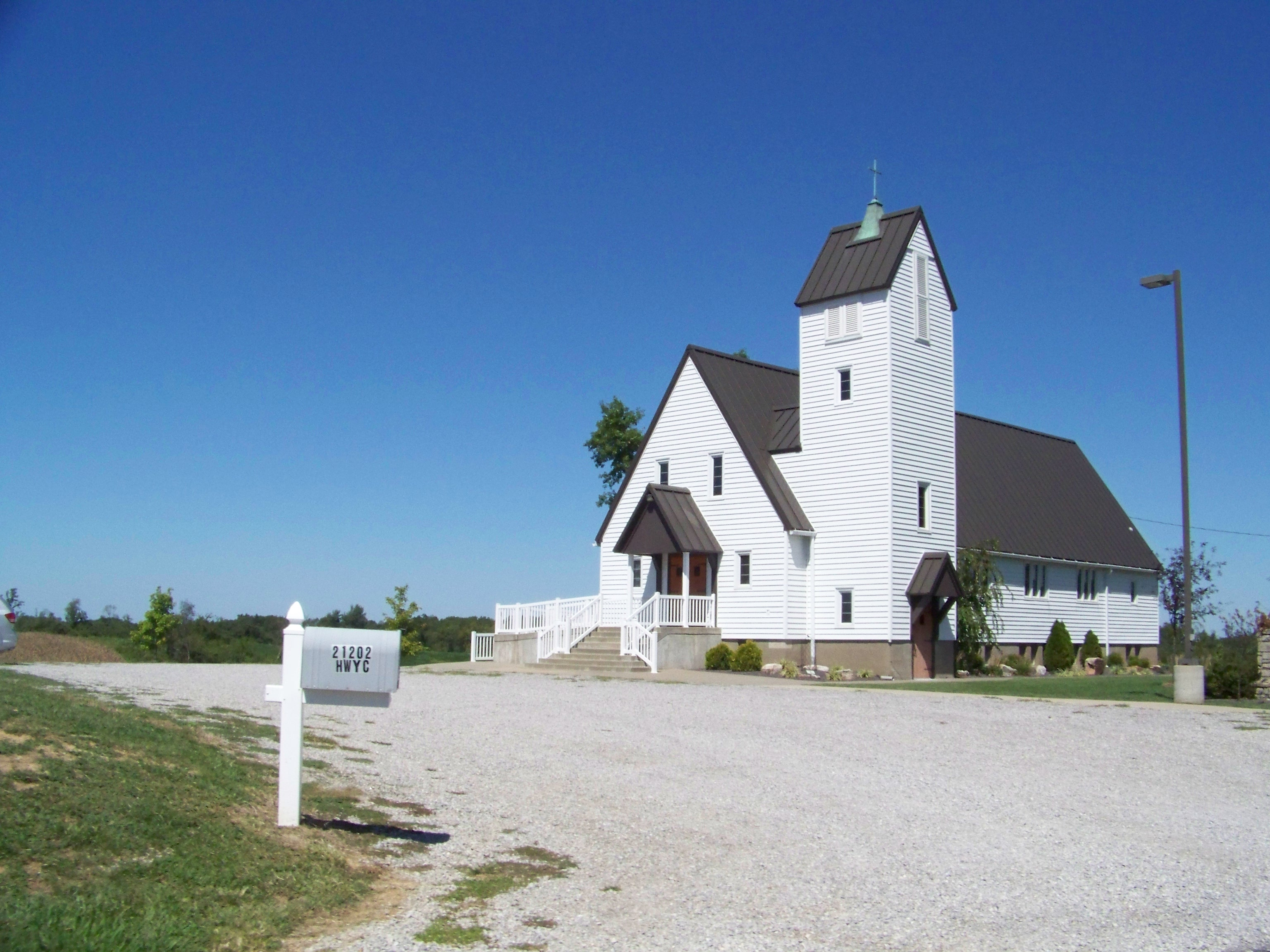
Zion Lutheran rebuilt following 2006 tornado

== Community ==
Crosstown has three churches in the community. There is St. James Catholic Church, which was founded in 1890. The Baptist church is Bethlehem Baptist Church, which was destroyed by the tornado in 2006, except for the foundation. The church congregation decided to rebuild at the same location and consecrated their new church in 2007. The Lutheran church is Zion Lutheran Church of Crosstown. The tornado destroyed the roof and all the windows in the building. Miraculously, the Catholic Church had no real damage done except the stained glass windows all being broken.

== Gallery ==
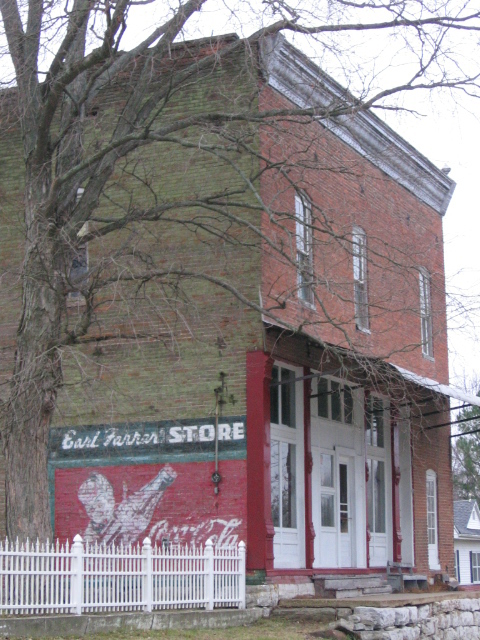
Old Earl Farrar General Store

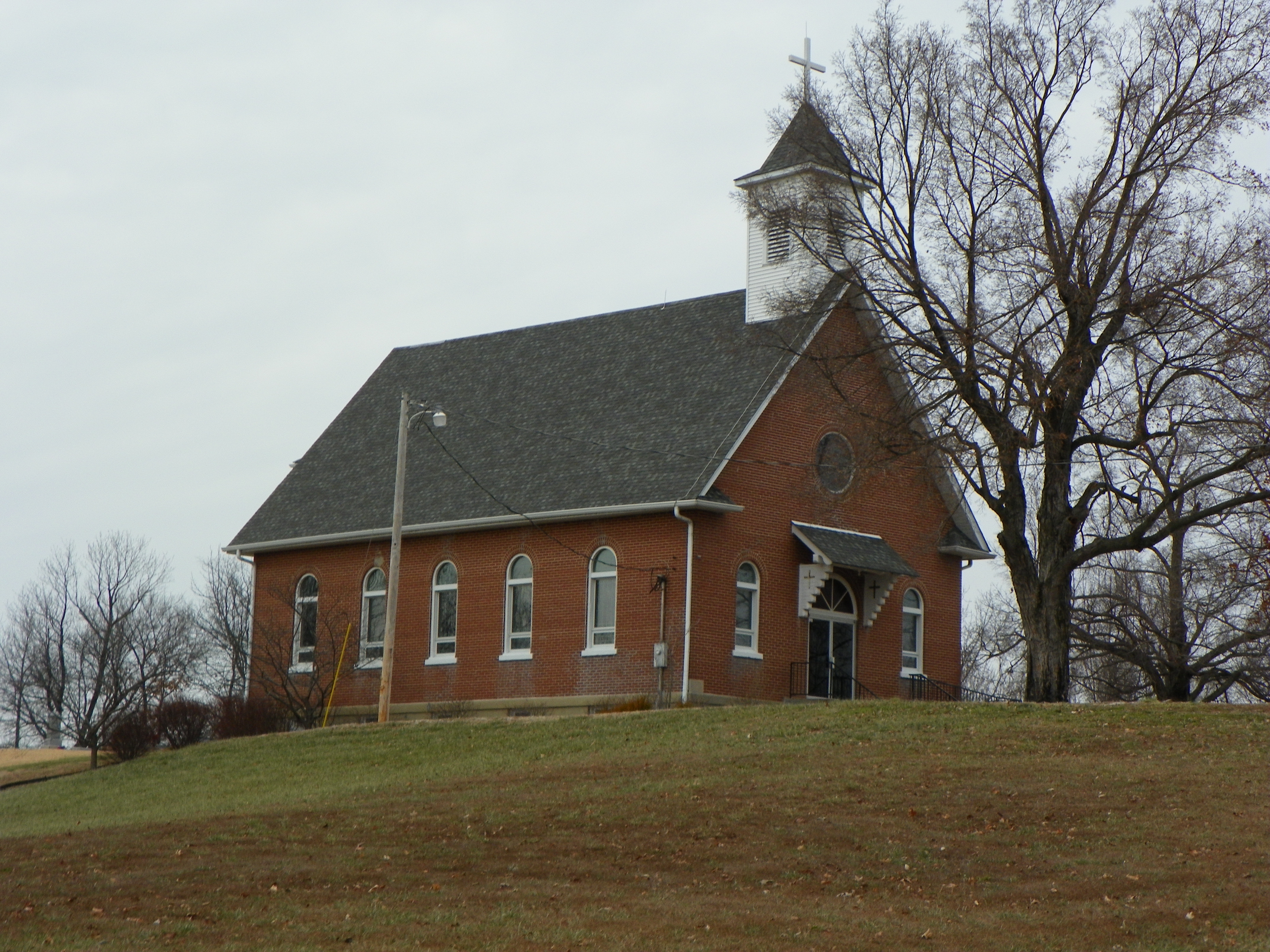
St. James Roman Catholic Church

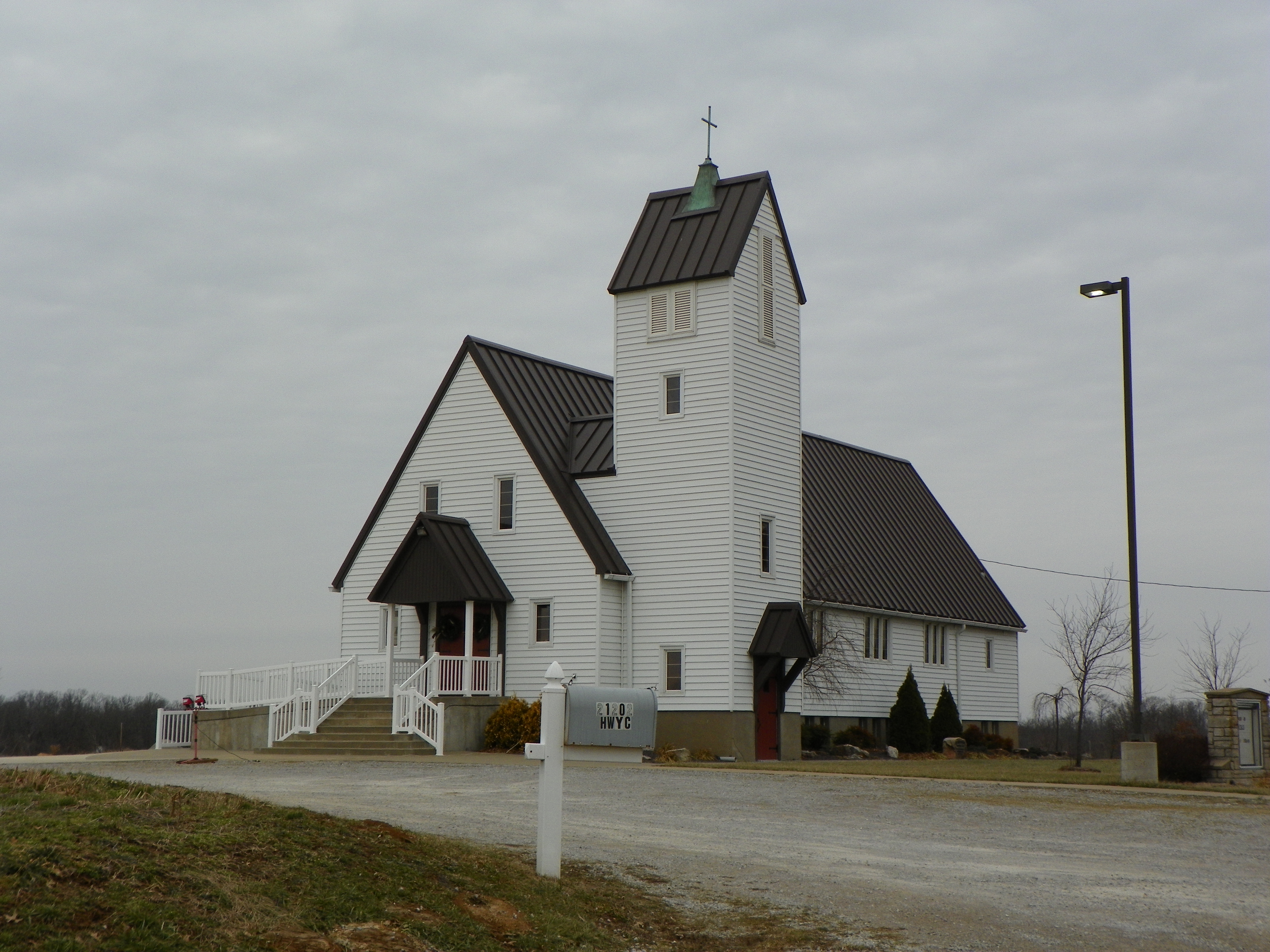
Zion Lutheran Church

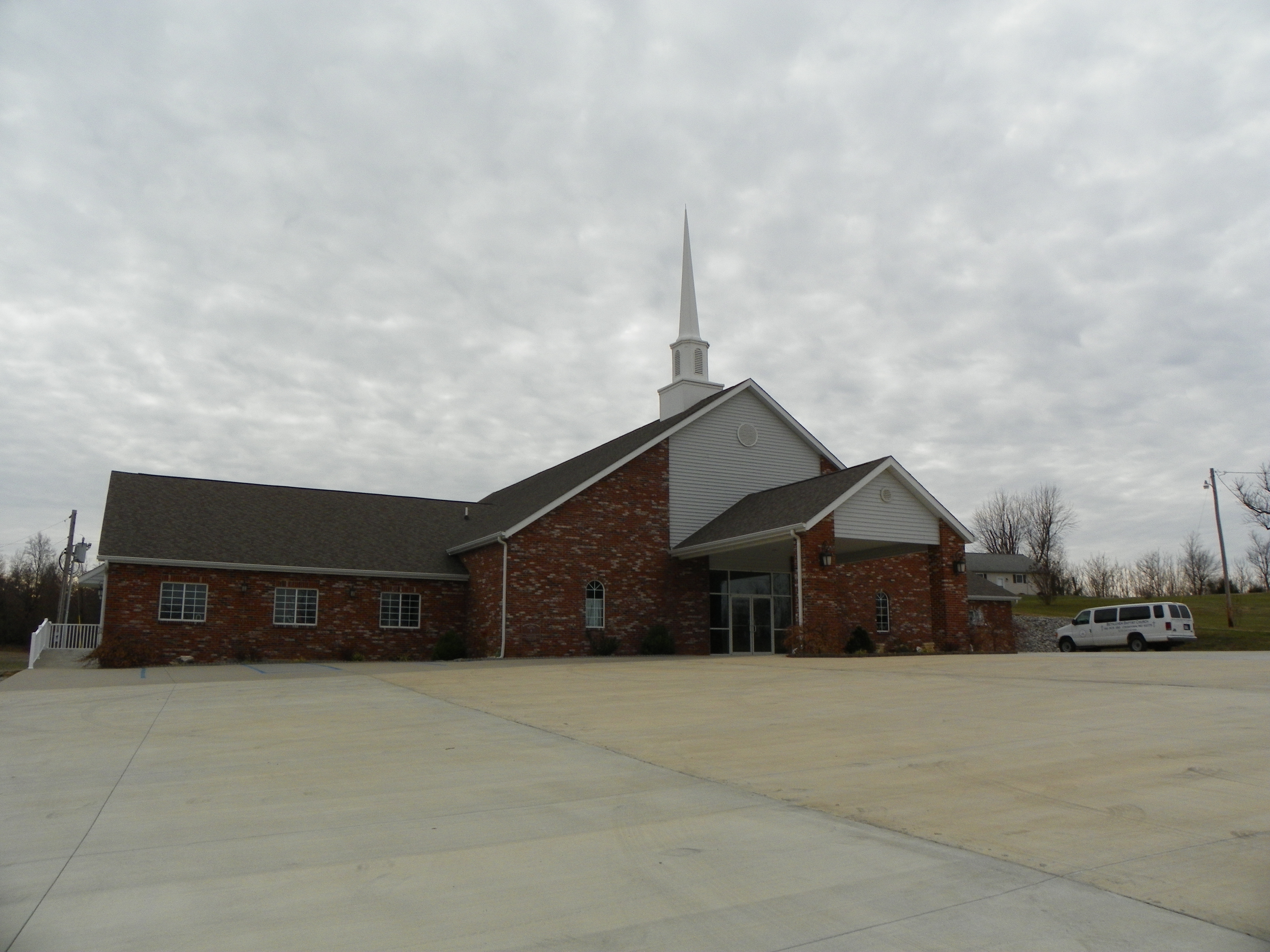
Bethlehem Baptist Church
