= St. James Roman Catholic Church (Crosstown, Missouri) =

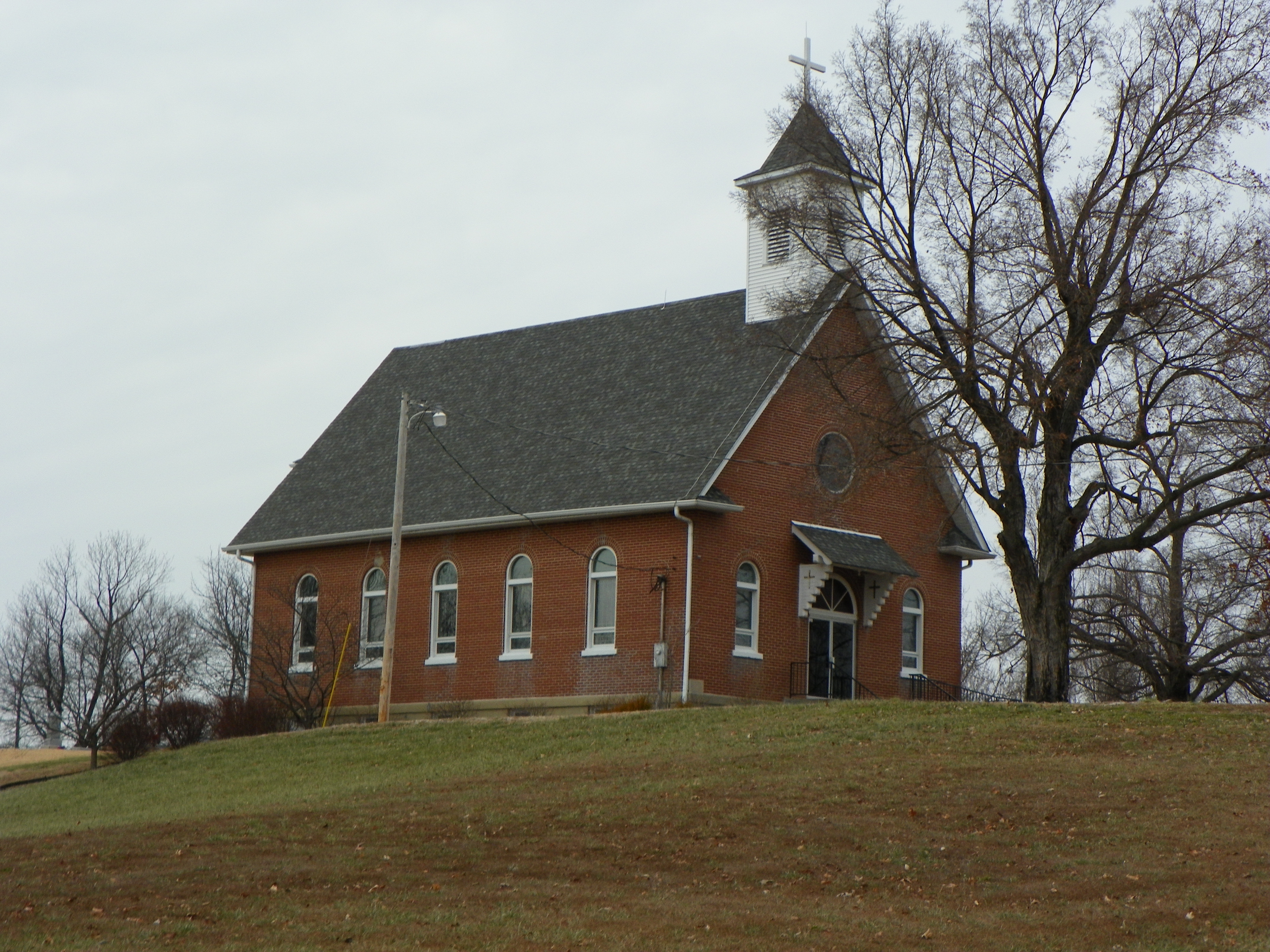

- Location within Missouri
- 37°44′47″N 89°43′40″W
- Country: United States
- Denomination: Roman Catholic Church

History
- Founded: 1890

Administration
- Archdiocese: Archdiocese of St. Louis
- Deanery: Ste. Genevieve

St. James Catholic Church is a Catholic church in Crosstown, Missouri. It is operated as a mission church of the parish of St. Vincent de Paul in Perryville. It is under the jurisdiction of the Ste. Genevieve Deanery of the Archdiocese of St. Louis.

== History ==
The original mission church started in a private home in 1860s. The frame church was begun in 1884 and finished in 1889. The church was restored after the fire of 1926.
