= St. Paul's United Church of Christ =

Church in Fort Washington, Pennsylvania, United States

Coordinates: 40.13541°N 75.21377°W

St. Paul's United Church of Christ is a United Church of Christ church in Fort Washington, Pennsylvania.

== Brief history ==
St. Paul's United Church of Christ traces its origins back to 1710 when Dutch and German settlers founded the Reformed Church at Whitemarsh. In 1819, the congregation worshiped in a building they constructed with local Lutheran church as Union Church of Whitemarsh. In 1894 the congregations mutually separated with the Lutherans becoming Zion Evangelical Lutheran Church and the Reformed congregation becoming St. Paul's Reformed Church of Whitemarsh at Fort Washington, with a new building about a mile away.
