= Farrar, Missouri =

- unincorporated community
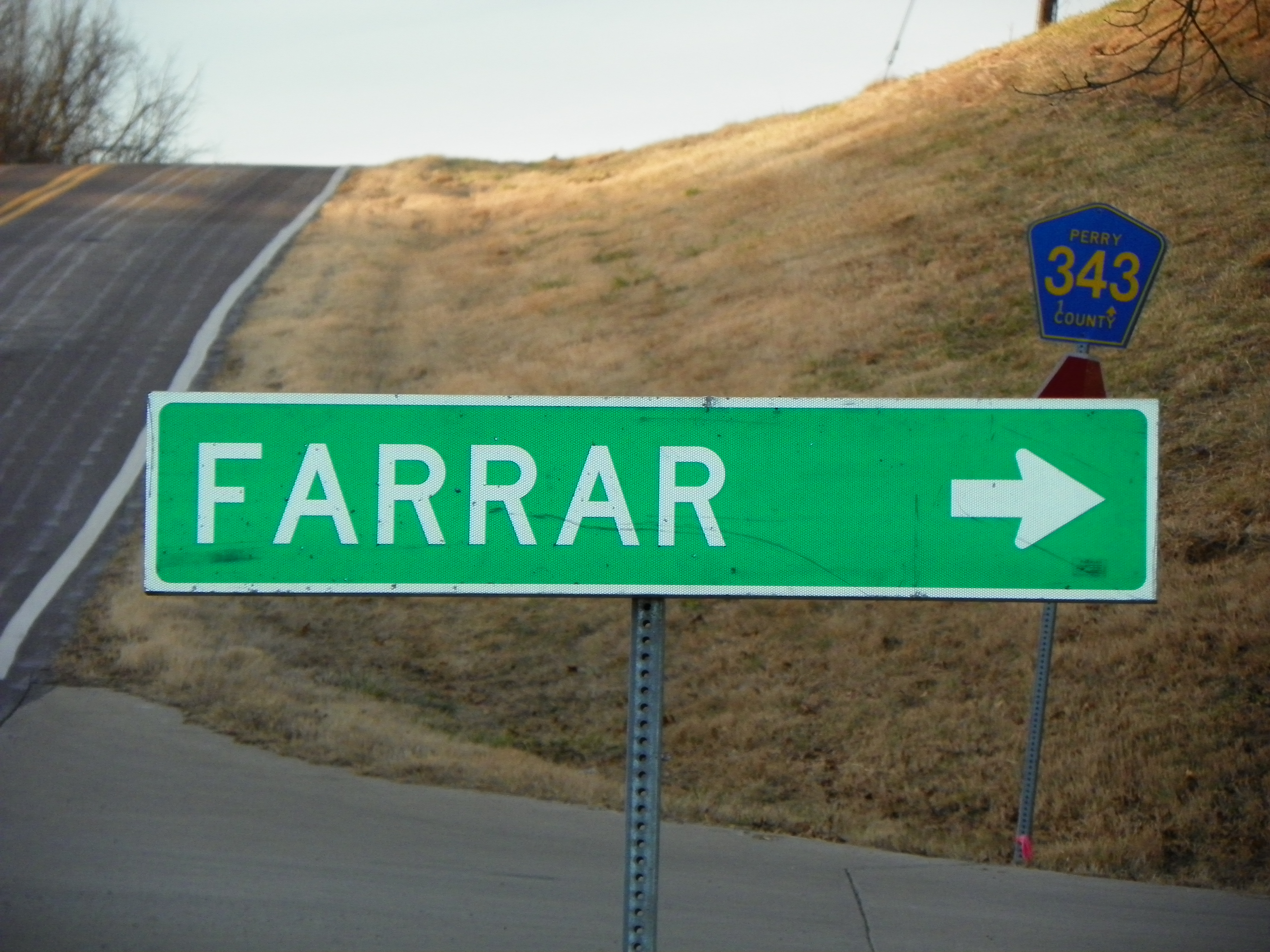
- Farrar, Missouri, road sign

- Location of Farrar, Missouri
- Coordinates: 37°42′08″N 89°41′19″W
- Country: United States
- State: Missouri
- County: Perry
- Township: Salem

Area
  - Total: 1.26 sq mi (3.26 km^{2})
  - Land: 1.26 sq mi (3.26 km^{2})
  - Water: 0 sq mi (0 km^{2})
- Elevation: 476 ft (145 m)

Population (2000)
  - Total: 65
  - Estimate (2010): 66
  - Density: 785/sq mi (302.9/km^{2})
- Time zone: UTC-6 (Central (CST))
  - Summer (DST): UTC-5 (CDT)
- ZIP code: 63746
- Area code: 573
- FIPS code: 29-29157
- GNIS feature ID: 717857

Farrar /ˈfɑːr/ is an unincorporated community in Salem Township in eastern Perry County, Missouri, United States. It is located eight miles east of Perryville, ninety miles south of Saint Louis and 3.7 miles from the Mississippi River.

== History ==
The original German-Saxon settlement was known as Salem and was centered on the Salem Lutheran Church built in 1859. In 1890, R.P.Farrar opened the Farrar General Store. Originally, mail had been brought in from the nearby town of Schalls and handed out on the church steps after Sunday services, until 1892 when R.P.Farrar rode by horseback to Jefferson City to make a request for a post office. Upon arriving, he learned that the name Salem had already been taken. Due to an already existing Salem in Missouri, the soon-to-be postmaster Farrar used his name as a temporary solution, which became permanent. Soon after, the "Bueckman" General Store and two blacksmiths were established in Farrar. Despite its size, over the years Farrar has fielded a number of general stores, a dairy cooperative, a transport company, as well as a couple local baseball teams. The post office closed in 2006.

== Community ==
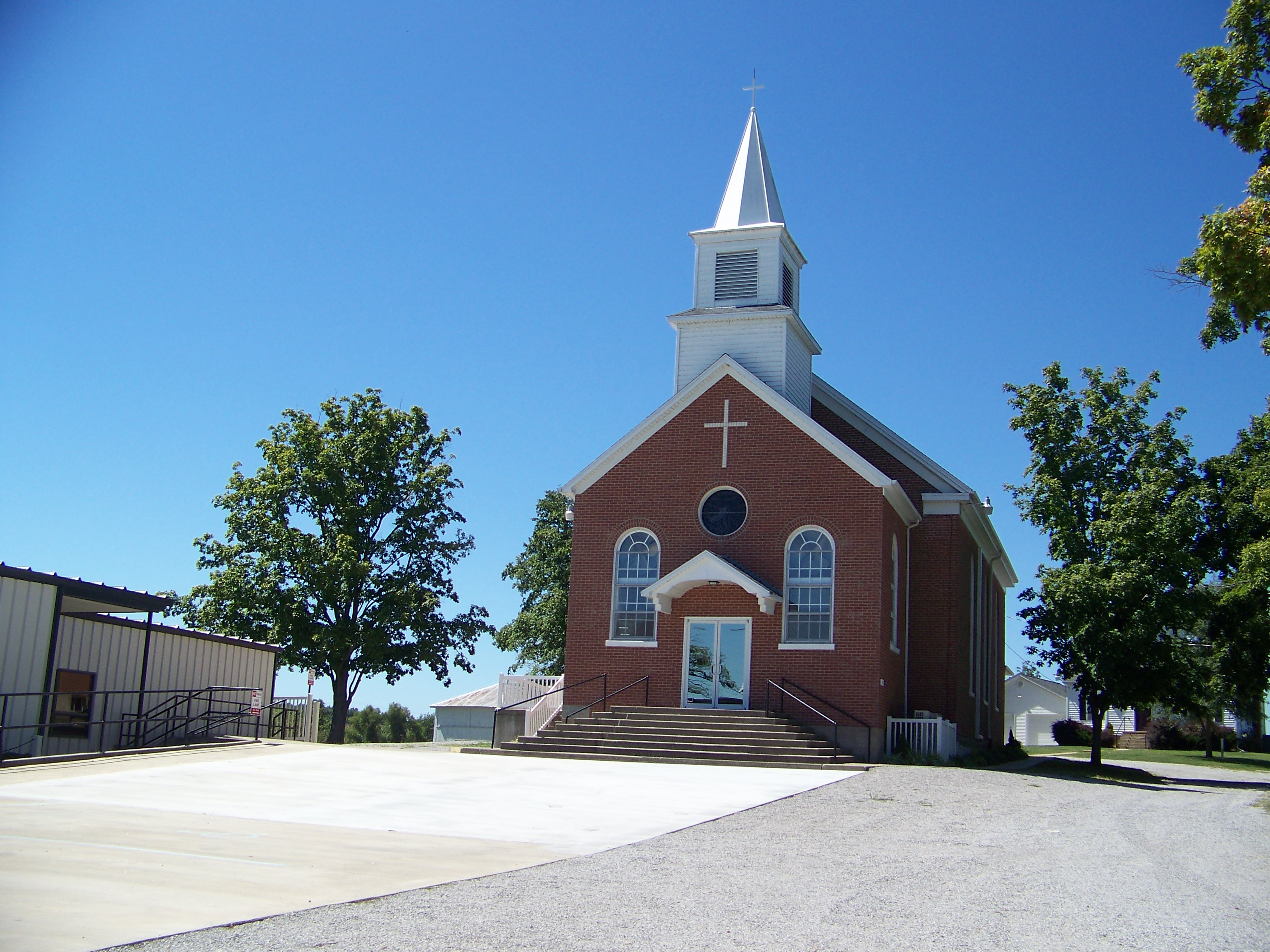
Salem Lutheran Church

At present, the community of Farrar has approximately 22 households, a church: Salem Lutheran Church, Missouri Synod, which serves the local Lutheran population, the Salem Lutheran Parochial School providing education to students grades 1-8, and a historic B&B.

== Geography ==
According to the United States Postal Service, the zip code of Farrar covers a total area of 1.26 sq mi/3.26 km2, all land. The area is surrounded by farms and woodland.

== Demographics ==
=== 2000 census ===
As Farrar is no longer an incorporated town, census data is no longer collected on the community as a whole. However, according to demographic data related to the census of 2000, there were an estimated 22 households with 66 people residing in the village. The racial makeup of the village was 100.0% White and 0.0% from other races. Hispanic or Latino of any race were 0.0% of the population.

The median age in the village was 35.30 years. The gender makeup of the village was 38 male individuals and 27 female individuals.

== Gallery ==
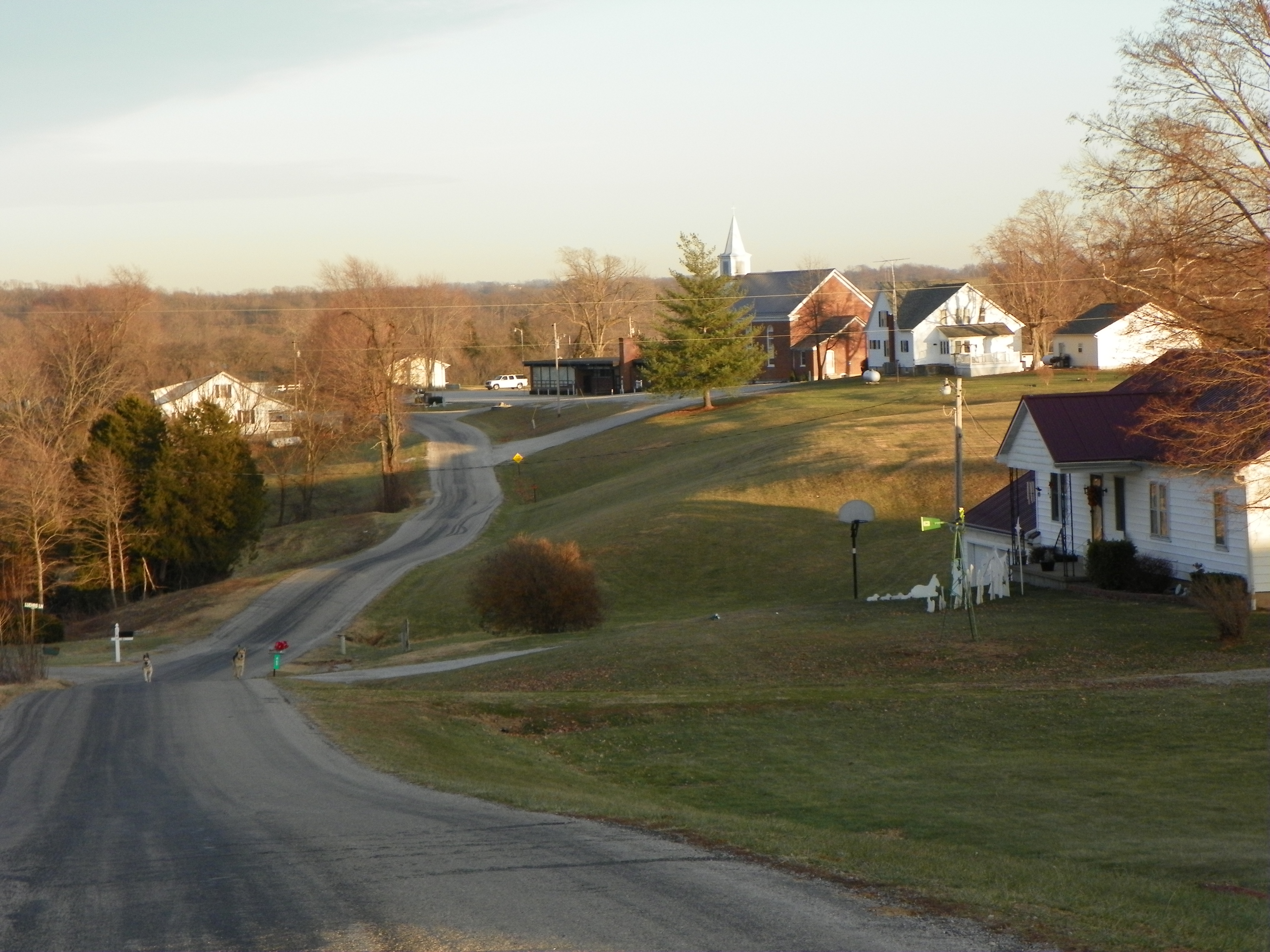
Farrar, Missouri

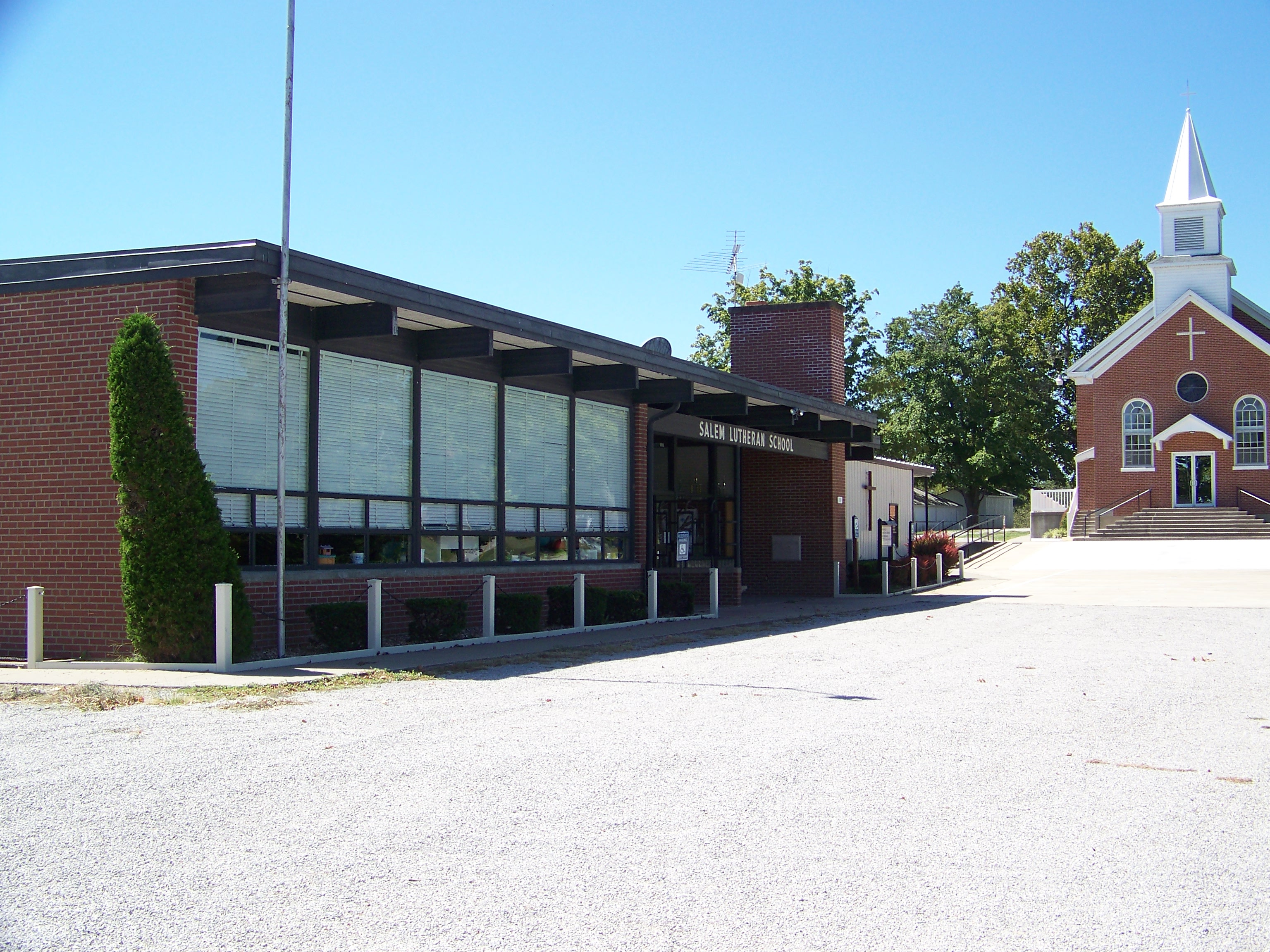
Salem Lutheran School

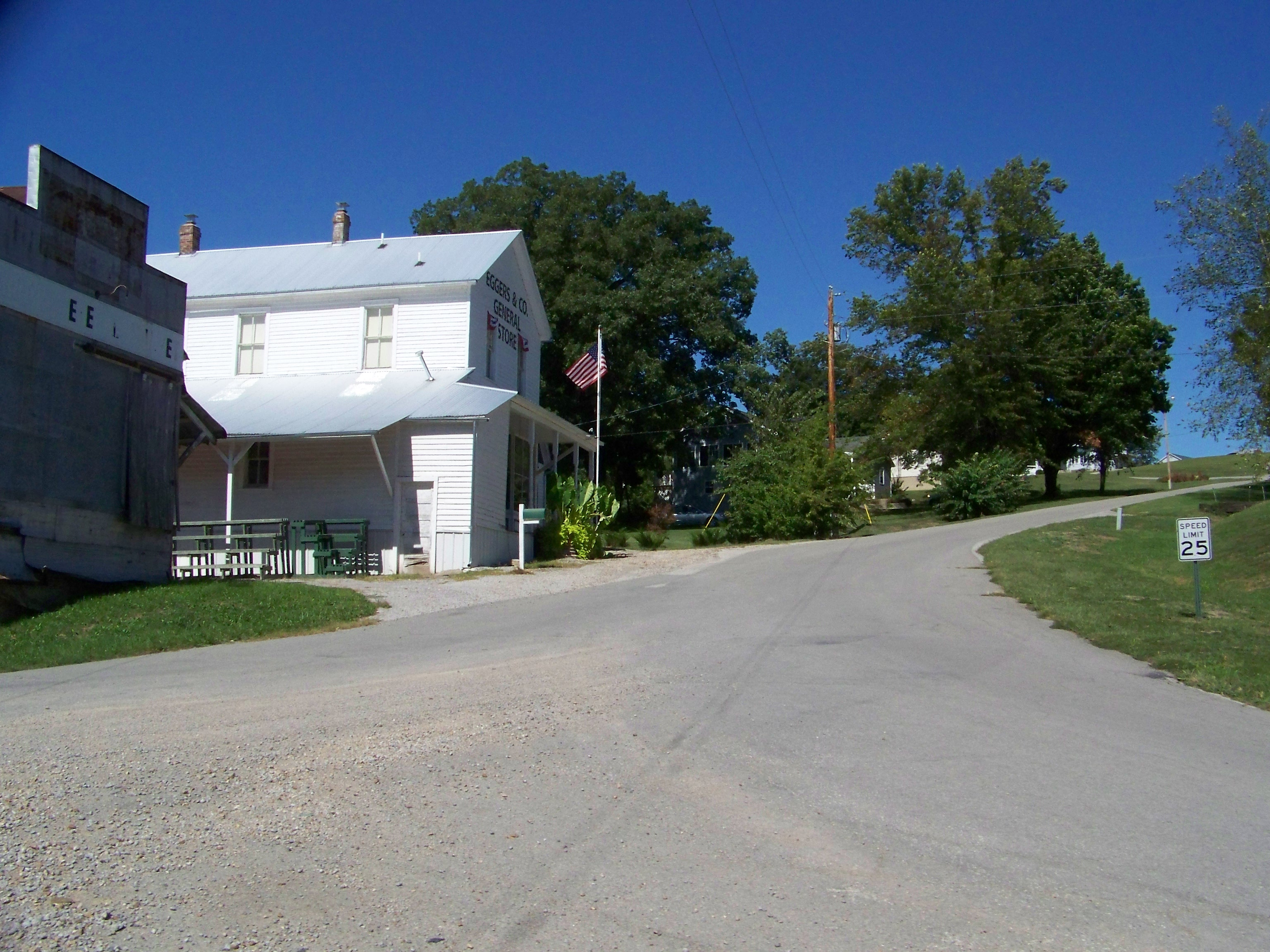
Egger's General Store

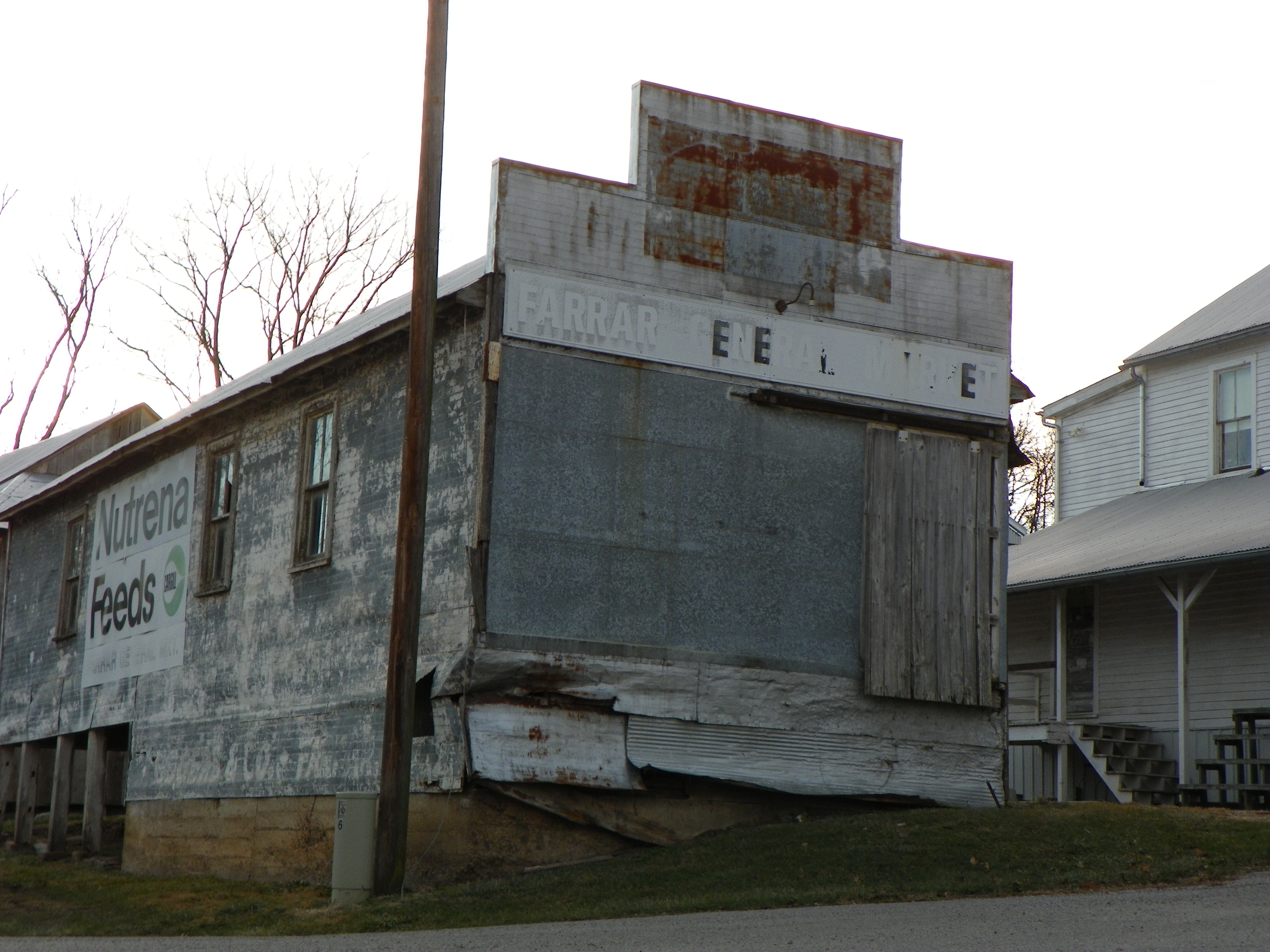
Old Farrar General Market
