= Salem Lutheran Church (Farrar, Missouri) =

Salem Lutheran Church, Farrar, Missouri
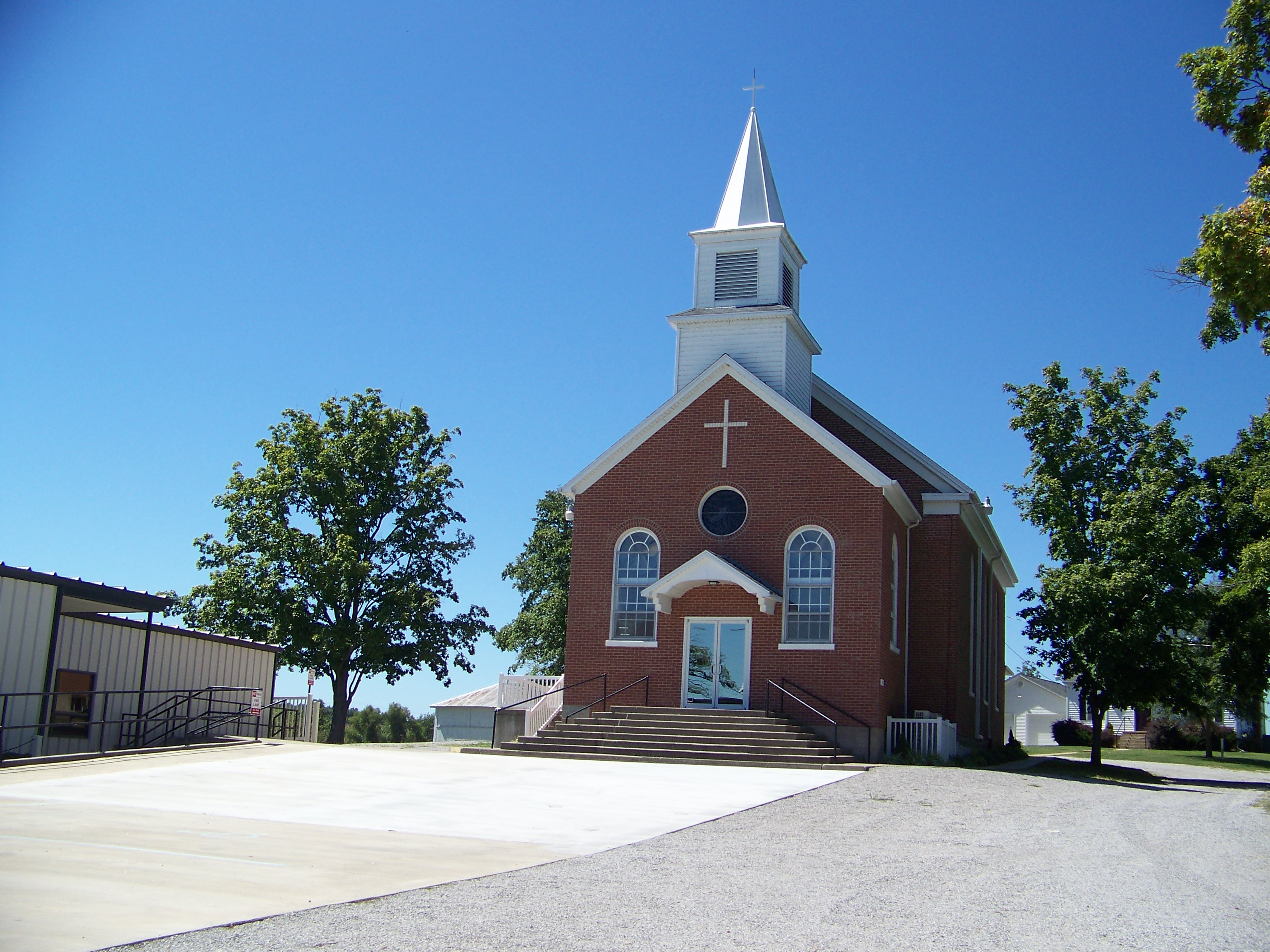

- Location within Missouri
- 37°42′08″N 89°41′19″W
- Location: 299 Pcr 328, Farrar, Missouri 63746
- Country: United States
- Denomination: Lutheran Church–Missouri Synod

History
- Founded: May 16, 1859
- Dedicated: November 7, 1886

Architecture
- Construction cost: $4,000 (1886 dollars)

Administration
- District: Missouri District

Salem Lutheran Church is an LCMS (Lutheran Church–Missouri Synod) church in Farrar, Missouri.

== Name ==
The community was founded in 1859 and was known as Salem, and the Lutheran church was known by the same name. In 1892, R. P. Farrar, the owner of Farrar General Store, made a request for a post office. However, due to an already existing Salem in Missouri, the soon-to-be postmaster Farrar used his name as a temporary solution, which became permanent. Despite the community's name change, the church continued to be known as Salem.

== History ==
The Salem congregation was founded on May 16, 1859 by eleven men who had settled in the area that is now Farrar. They purchased land from the English and Scotch-Irish settlers centered on the Abernathy Settlement, present-day Longtown, Missouri.

The original congregation had some ties to the Paitzdorf congregation in Paitzdorf (present-day Uniontown), Missouri. Their first pastor was Rev. Theodore Karl Gruber, a son of the pastor that had led the immigration to Paitzdorf.

The first church building, a log cabin, was dedicated in 1860 and was described at that time as "ein freundliches Blockhaus" or a friendly log cabin.

The congregation grew with the influx of Lutheran settlers from Saxony, as well as more arrivals in 1866 from the Lamstaedt and Scheessel areas of Hanover.

The present church building was erected in 1886 and dedicated on November 7, 1886. The cost of the building was $4,000. Each side of the building has three arched two-story windows, with an wrap-around balcony and an arched print stamped metal ceiling on the interior. The pulpit was originally located above altar on the back wall of the building, but was moved to the left side of the altar in 1927. The current pipe organ was dedicated on July 2, 1939.

== School ==
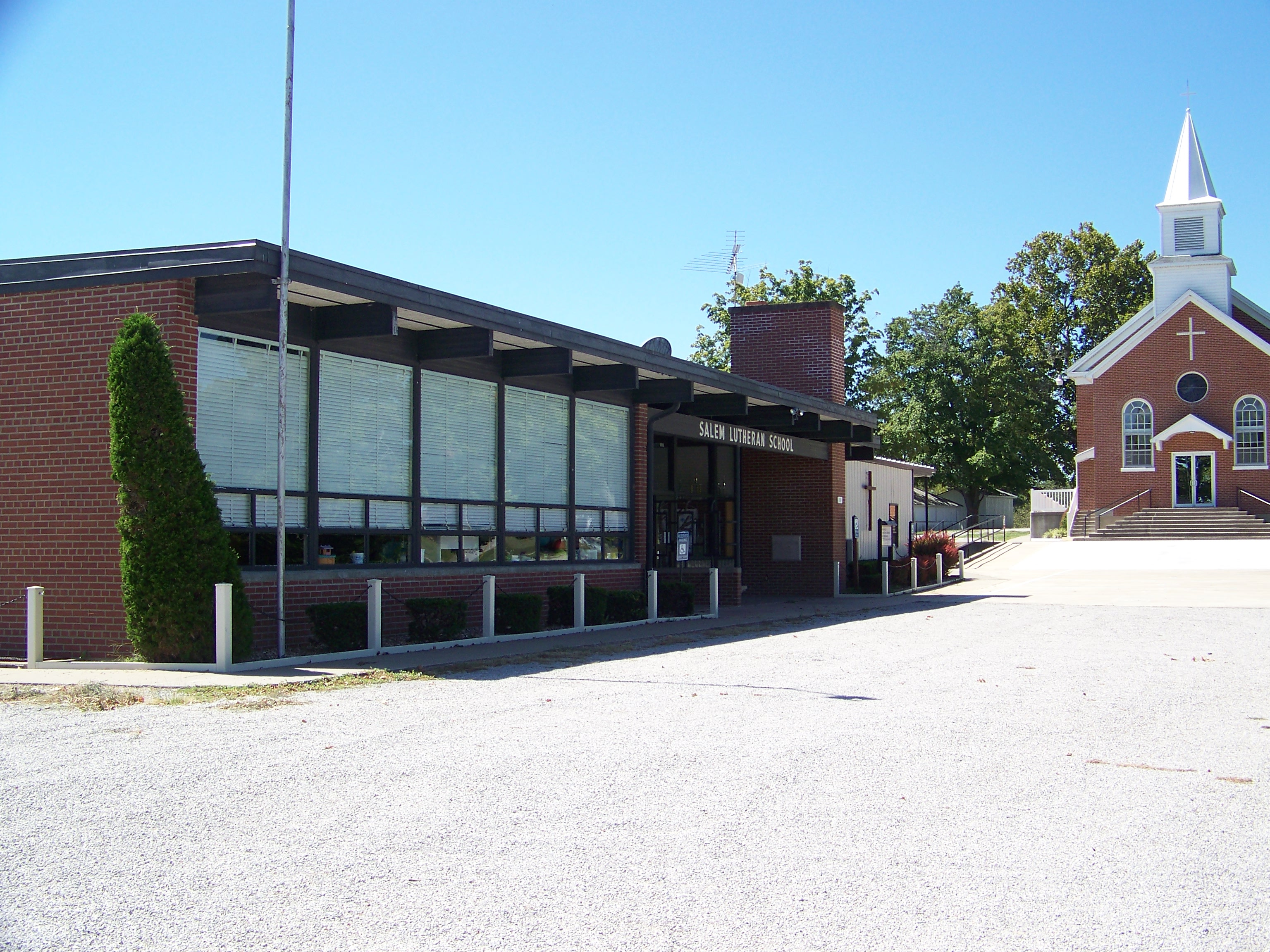
Salem Lutheran School

In 1867, a Lutheran school was established with the church building also serving as the school. The first school building, a brick schoolhouse, was dedicated on September 25, 1892. A second wooden framed school was constructed in 1926. Both buildings were razed and replaced with a new brick schoolhouse which was constructed and dedicated in 1958. In 1996, an addition was added to the school which contains school and church offices, meeting rooms and a gymnasium.

In 2011, Salem Lutheran school became part of United in Christ Lutheran School.

== Parish ==
Since 1974, Salem Lutheran Church in Farrar and Zion Lutheran Church in Crosstown have been in a dual-parish arrangement with one pastor serving both congregations. Rev. Roger Abernathy serves as pastor of the Salem-Zion Dual Parish.

== Gallery ==
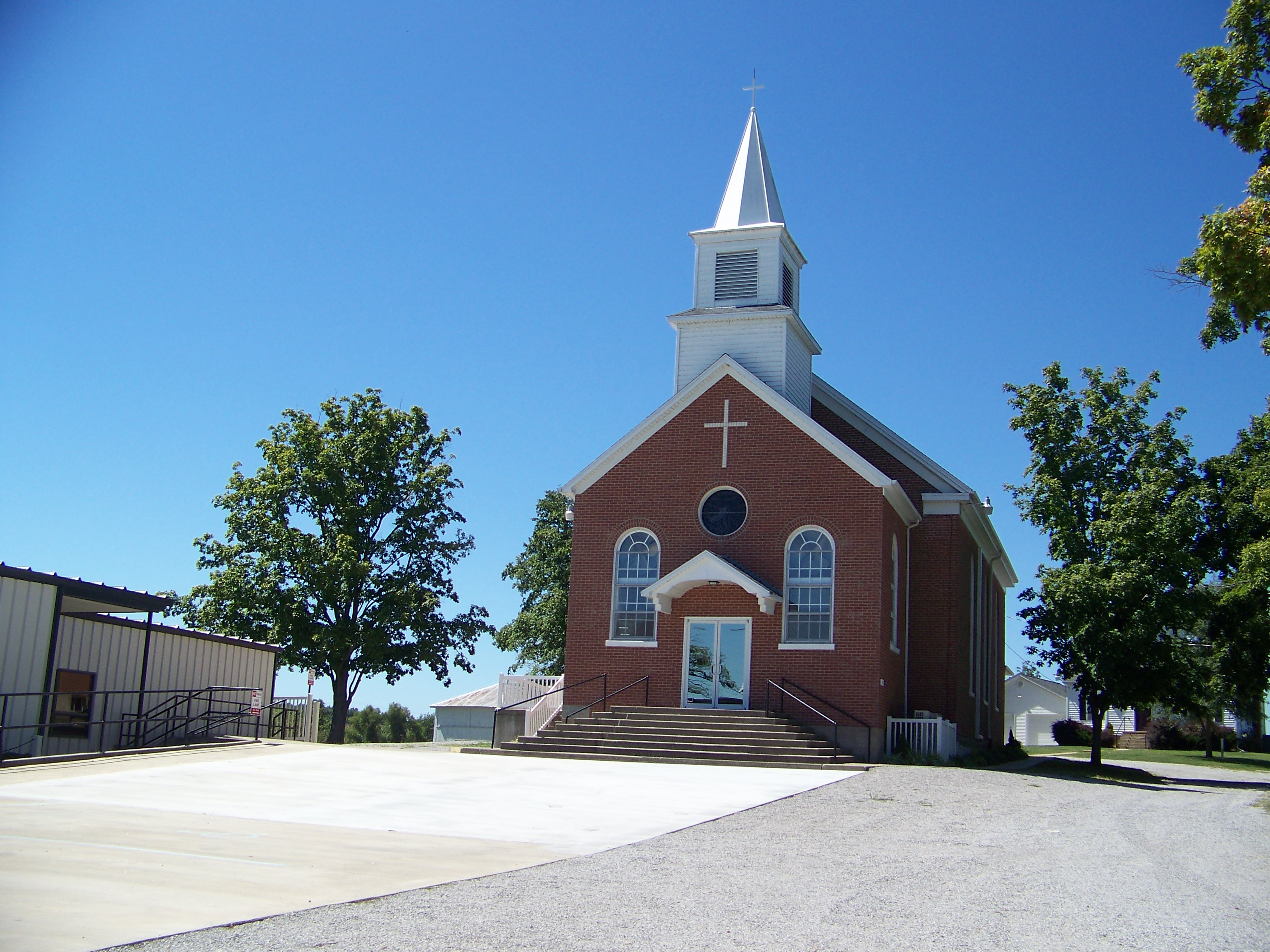
Salem Lutheran Church

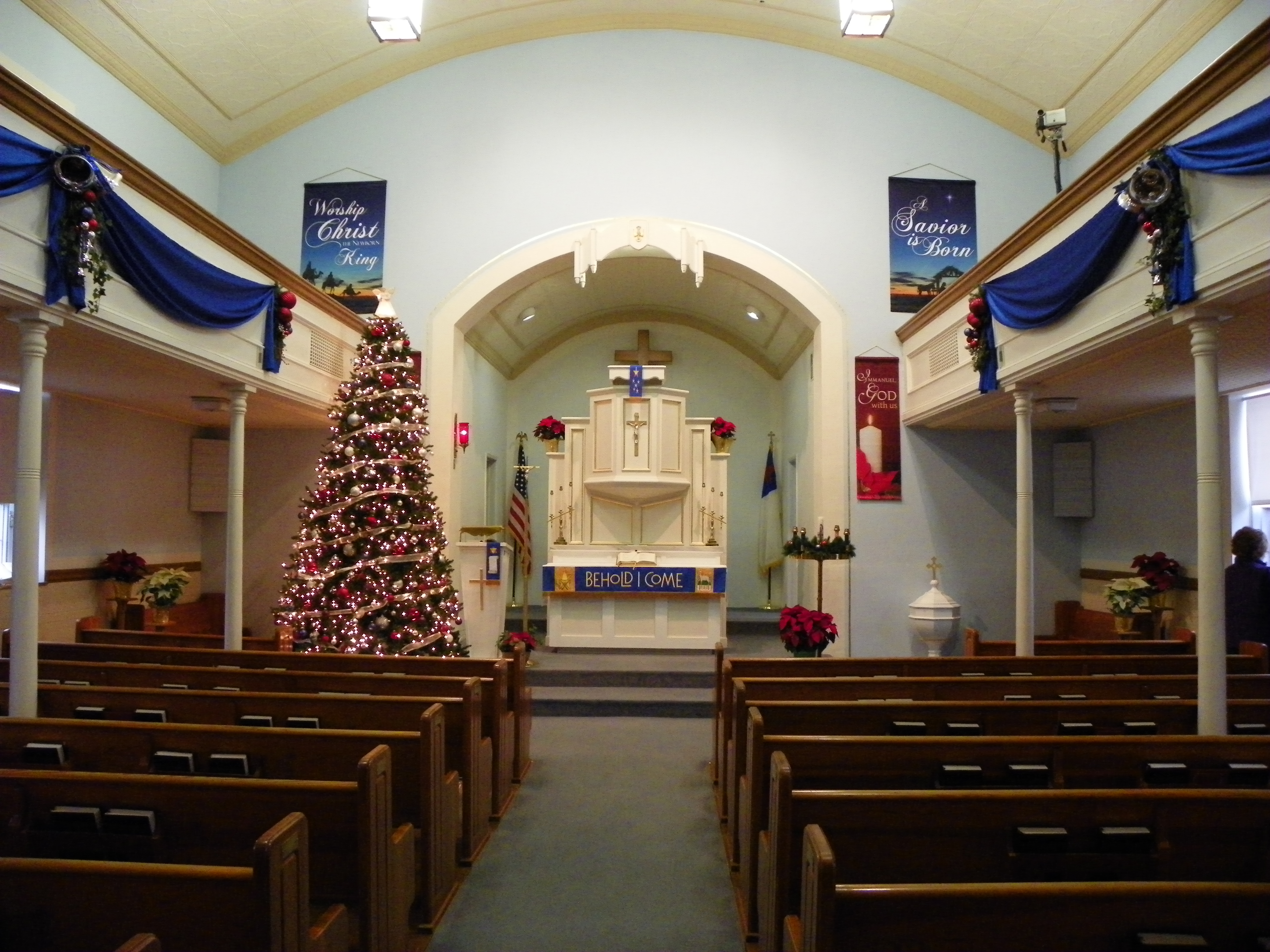
Church interior
