= Salem Township, Perry County, Missouri =

Township in the US state of Missouri

Salem Township, Missouri
- Civil Township
- Location of Perry County
- Coordinates: 37°43′39″N 89°42′07″W
- Country: United States
- State: Missouri
- County: Perry
- Established: Places of the USA: Bois Brule Township

Area
  - Total: 49 sq mi (126 km^{2})
  - Land: 47 sq mi (122 km^{2})
  - Water: 1.5 sq mi (4 km^{2}) 3.17%
- GNIS Feature ID: 767156

Salem Township is one of the eight townships located in Perry County, Missouri, in the United States of America.

== Name ==
Salem Township was named after the town Salem. Salem was a common name for churches and towns at that time. However, when postmaster Farrar attempted to register the community under the name of Salem, he found the name had already been taken. His name was used instead. Salem, nonetheless, was used to name the township.

== Geography ==
Salem Township is situated in the eastern part of Perry County, and was organized between 1870 and 1890. There are 2 unincorporated communities in Salem Township: Crosstown and Farrar. The course of Cinque Hommes Creek flows through Salem Township, where its mouth empties into the Mississippi River. The Mississippi River forms the eastern border of the township.

== Demographics ==
=== 2010 Census ===
As of the census of 2010, there were 673 people living in the township. The racial makeup of the township was 96.9% White, 1.7% Black, 0.1% American Indian and Alaska Native, 0.3% Asian, 0.4% from other races. The median age is 41. 61.34% of people in Salem township are married. 6.17% are divorced.

The average household size is 2.77 people. 33.51% of people are married, with children. 4.64% have children, but are single.
