= Zion Evangelical Lutheran Church (Chicago) =

Coordinates: 41°51′25.1″N 87°38′53.1″W

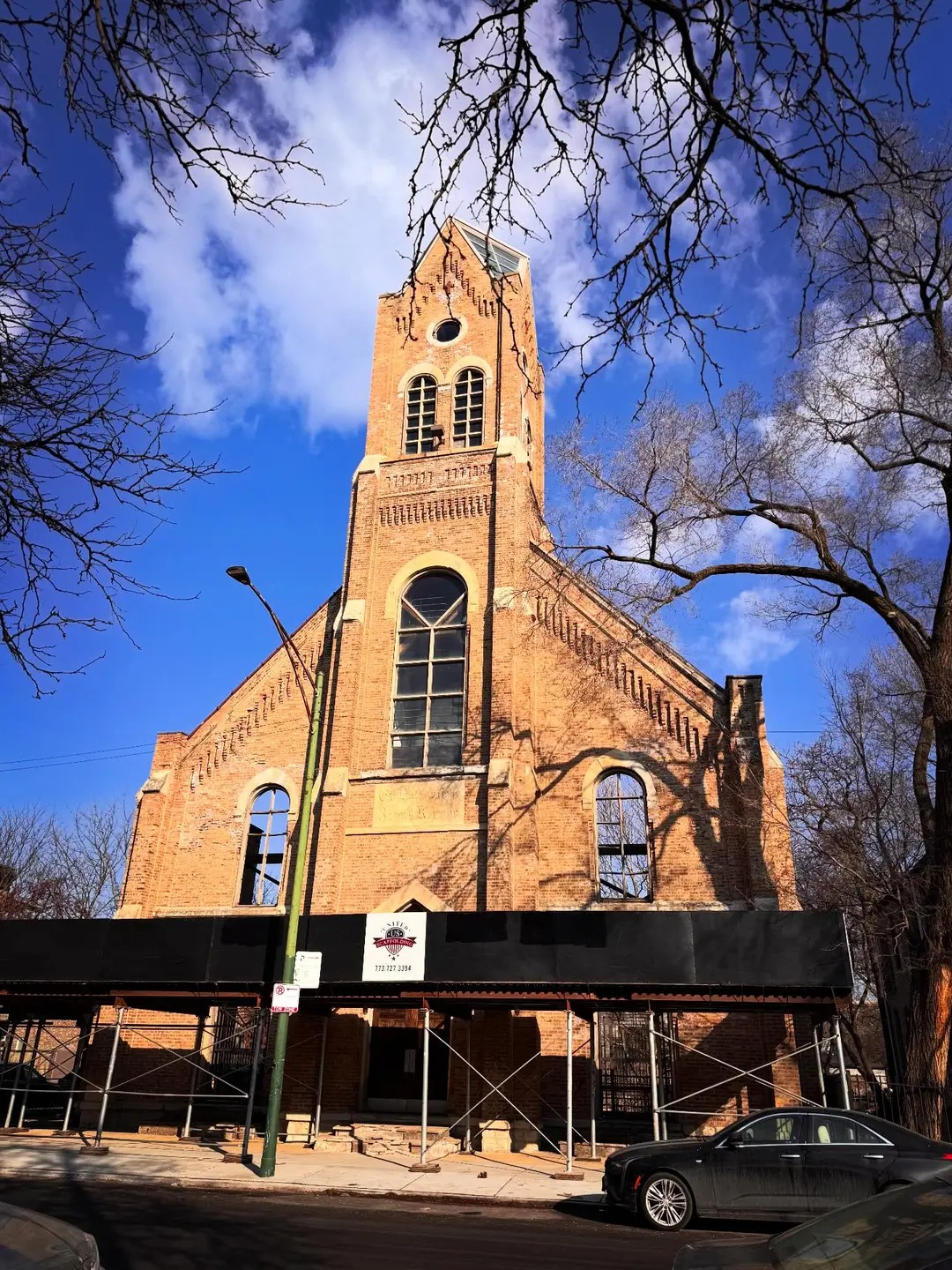
- Zion Evangelical Lutheran Church
- Country: USA
- Denomination: Lutheran Church Missouri Synod

History
- Founded: 1850

Architecture
- Closed: 1956

Zion Evangelical Lutheran Church was a church in Chicago on 19th and Peoria streets in the Pilsen neighborhood. The church was founded in 1850 and the current remains of the church are from 1880. From roughly 1910 to 1941, Adolf Kuring served as the church's minister.

After a 1979 fire and windstorm knocked down the walls and left the entrance, steeple and footprint of the building, the property was quickly purchased by John Podmajersky.
