= Tornado outbreak of September 21–23, 2006 =

Weather event in the United States

Meteorological history
- Duration: September 21–23, 2006

Tornado outbreak
- Tornadoes: 48 confirmed
- Max. rating: F4 tornado
- Duration: ~51 hours

Overall effects
- Casualties: ≥ 14 tornado-related injuries; 12 non-tornadic deaths (8 in Kentucky)
- Damage: $13 million
- Areas affected: Midwestern and Southern United States

The Tornado outbreak of September 21–23, 2006 was a significant tornado outbreak that occurred across a large swath of the Central United States from September 21 – September 23, 2006. 48 tornadoes were confirmed.

== Overview ==
Some of the September 22 storms caused heavy damage in some locales with injuries. The strongest tornado hit Crosstown, Missouri – it was an F4 tornado, the first since March 12. Several well constructed structures in Crosstown were completely leveled, and hundreds of others were severely damaged. Areas just outside Pilot Knob, a small town in Missouri, were affected by two separate F2 tornadoes that caused considerable damage. The northern fringe of Metropolis in Illinois was also hit by a damaging F3 tornado in which homes were completely destroyed. In eastern and central Missouri alone, over 400 homes or other structures were badly damaged or destroyed. 10 people were injured. Several tornadoes also occurred north of Birmingham, Alabama – three of which were rated as F2's. In addition to the tornadoes, there were numerous reports of straight-line wind damage and hail larger than baseballs, as well as countless reports of damage from flash flooding due to the heavy rains as a result of the thunderstorms.

This was one of the most widespread non-tropical September outbreaks in United States history, yet no tornado-related deaths occurred (although 12 people were killed by other thunderstorm impacts).

== Confirmed tornadoes ==
Confirmed tornadoes by Fujita rating
FU	F0	F1	F2	F3	F4	F5	Total
0	21	17	8	1	1	0	48

=== September 21 event ===
F#	Location	County	Time (UTC)	Path length	Damage
Kansas
F1	Russell area	Russell	1901	unknown	Tornado damaged two sheds, blew the roof off an oil field pipeline building, and blew the windows out of a house.
F0	NE of Lincoln to SE of Solomon Rapids	Lincoln, Mitchell	2013	unknown	Tornado struck a farmstead and damaged a few outbuildings, a TV antenna, and a house.
F0	SW of Beloit	Mitchell	2032	unknown	Tornado remained over open country and didn't cause damage.
F0	E of Barnard	Lincoln	2116	unknown	Brief tornado remained over open country and didn't cause damage.
F0	W of Culver	Ottawa	2140	unknown	Tornado remained over open country and didn't cause damage.
F0	N of Minneapolis	Ottawa	2140	unknown	Tornado remained over open country and didn't cause damage.
Oklahoma
F1	S of Lane to E of Farris	Atoka	0125	0.6 mi (965.61 m)	Many trees were downed, and several feed barns were destroyed with some of the 2x4's driven through the roof of the residence at the affected farmstead. Sheet metal was wrapped around trees.
F0	W of Antlers	Pushmataha	0125	0.4 mi (643.74 m)	Trees were downed, and some homes sustained minor damage.
F0	NW of Antlers	Pushmataha	0128	1 mi (1.61 km)	Tornado destroyed a storage building and snapped trees.
Louisiana
F0	SW of Forked Island	Vermilion	unknown	unknown	Brief tornado downed power poles.
F0	W of Erath	Vermilion	unknown	unknown	Tornado downed trees, and damaged mobile homes and portable structures.
F1	N of Delcambre	Vermilion, Iberia	unknown	unknown	Ten houses and mobile homes were damaged, and one mobile home was completely destroyed. Trees were downed as well.
F0	SW of Coteau	St. Martin	unknown	unknown	Tornado touched down in an open field and didn't cause damage.
Arkansas
F1	N of Wickes	Polk	unknown	unknown	Tornado downed or snapped dozens of trees, and two houses and a car were damaged by falling trees. Two storage buildings were overturned.
Sources: SPC Storm Reports for 09/21, Wichita office, Tulsa office, Hastings office, KCTV

=== September 22 event ===
F#	Location	County	Time (UTC)	Path length	Damage
Missouri
F1	St. James	Phelps	1920	3 mi (4.83 km)	Industrial buildings sustained major damage, and houses lost large sections of their roofs. Trees were snapped, RVs were flipped, and semi-trailers were overturned. St. James Middle School sustained roof damage. Two people were injured.
F0	Leasburg	Crawford	1940	3 mi (4.83 km)	Several houses in town sustained minor roof and siding damage.
F1	S of Leasburg to NE of Hinch	Crawford	1945	10 mi (16.09 km)	Seven houses sustained varying degrees of damage, mostly to their roofs, siding, and windows. Two machine sheds were destroyed, and many trees were downed.
F2	SE of Oates to E of Pilot Knob	Reynolds, Iron	2010	25 mi (40.23 km)	Near the beginning of the path, the roofs of a barn and two houses were damaged. The tornado developed a multi-vortex structure as it passed north of Black, Missouri, where a mobile home was heavily damaged and shifted 30 yd (27.43 m). Farther East, vehicles were tossed up to 50 yd (45.72 m) from where they were parked, and an uninhabited house was completely destroyed. The tornado crossed into Iron County, where five houses sustained roof and exterior damage, and a mobile home was flipped on its side. Two houses also sustained damage from falling trees near Snow Hollow Lake. Near Pilot Knob, a mobile home sustained moderate damage, a machine shed was destroyed, and numerous houses sustained roof damage before the tornado dissipated. Many trees and power poles were snapped along the tornado’s track.
F1	SW of Richwoods	Washington	2015	3 mi (4.83 km)	Tornado damaged trees and the roof of a house. Debris from the house was thrown 200 yd (182.88 m) to the southeast.
F1	E of Richwoods to NW of Fletcher	Washington, Jefferson	2020	1.5 mi (2.41 km)	Two pole barns sustained roof damage, and many trees were downed.
F1	Fletcher	Jefferson	2020	1.3 mi (2.09 km)	Many trees were snapped, and a mobile home sustained minor damage.
F2	E of Roselle to E of Mine La Motte	Madison, St. Francois	2030	18 mi (28.97 km)	Tornado first caused tree damage near Fredericktown before splitting into a double funnel east of the town, where over 25 houses, mobile homes, and machine sheds sustained varying degrees of damage. The tornado merged back into a single funnel and inflicted F1 to F2 damage to four homes, scattering debris up to 100 yd (91.44 m) away. Farther east, the tornado split into a double funnel again, damaging four houses and completely destroying a mobile home, with debris up to 150 yd (137.16 m) away. The tornado merged back into a single funnel once again, snapping thousands of trees near a small lake and damaging four houses in that area. Before dissipating, four houses were damaged, and four machine sheds and a garage were destroyed. One person was critically injured.
F2	SW of Silver Lake	Perry	2047	6 mi (9.66 km)	Near the beginning of the path, a farm building was leveled, roofs were torn off of houses, and dozens of acres of trees were flattened. Farther east, many other trees were downed, and a barn was destroyed. At Lake Perry, recreational vehicles were overturned and damaged by falling trees.
F4	SE of Perryville to N of Murphysboro, Illinois	Perry, Jackson (IL)	2107	27.5 mi (44.26 km)	This violent tornado first destroyed a barn and partially unroofed a two-story house near Friedenberg, then blew trees onto another house. The tornado unroofed another house farther east than reached its peak F4 strength as it entered Crosstown, Missouri. Major structural damage occurred in there, with multiple houses and businesses heavily damaged or destroyed. A church and a nearby brick building lost their roofs, vehicles were flipped, and trees were mangled. Four well-constructed houses were completely leveled, one of which had only its bolted-down floor remaining. East of town, the tornado weakened to F3 intensity and destroyed a modular home, leaving only the bathroom standing, and some outbuildings. Two people were injured in this area when the car they were driving was thrown into a house. In Perry County alone, 62 houses were destroyed, 17 had major damage, and 23 sustained only minor damage. The tornado crossed the Mississippi River, pushed a coal barge into the shoreline, and blew out the tugboat's windows. In Illinois, the tornado weakened to F2 intensity, and destroyed a mobile home, then tore the roof and a wall off a farmhouse. Farther east, a house was unroofed, another house had its addition torn off, a swingset was blown 200 yd (182.88 m) and wrapped around a mailbox, an empty tractor-trailer rig was overturned, and an empty grain bin was blown 100 yd (91.44 m) into a field. Near Route 3, the tornado unroofed a brick house, snapped power poles, and flattened large areas of corn on nearby farms. At the Kinkaid Lake marina, about 50 RVs and boats were damaged, and minor tree damage occurred before the tornado dissipated. Hundreds of trees were snapped along the path. Six people reported injuries. Following the event, roofing and siding reportedly rained from the sky in Du Quoin, Illinois.
F2	NW of Pilot Knob	Iron	2210	5 mi (8.05 km)	Second tornado of the outbreak to pass near Pilot Knob. Tornado destroyed a mobile home and severely damaged a ranch house. Numerous trees were downed near Snow Hollow Lake.
F1	E of Neelyville	Butler	0057	0.25 miles (400 m)	A large tree was blown down. One house had roof damage and siding blown off. Several small branches were impaled into the side of the house where the siding had been blown off.
Alabama
F2	SW of Locust Fork	Blount	2302	1.3 mi (2.09 km)	One mobile home and one barn were completely destroyed. Two automobiles and one motorcycle were lifted from inside a barn and thrown at least 100 yd (91.44 m). Numerous trees and power lines were downed along the path.
F2	S of Locust Fork	Blount	2320	0.25 mi (402.34 m)	A workshop building and a house that was under construction collapsed. Other houses sustained shingle damage, and several trees were downed.
F2	Oneonta	Blount	0015	4.1 mi (6.60 km)	Numerous trees and power lines were blown down along the path. Oneonta High School suffered significant damage to its football field press box, and two concession stands were destroyed. The high school itself also sustained roof damage. The Blount County Courthouse sustained roof damage, and many flagpoles were broken. Several houses and outbuildings had major damage, and a local gas station had its canopy blown off. Three people were injured, one seriously.
F1	Albertville	Marshall	unknown	3.2 mi (5.15 km)	Several houses in southwest Albertville sustained roof, gutter, and awning damage. Several trees were downed as well.
F0	N of Littleville	Colbert	unknown	unknown	Brief tornado remained over open country and did not cause damage.
F0	N of Arab	Marshall	unknown	unknown	A tornado was photographed near Highway 69. Several trees were downed in this area, though it is not certain if this was a direct result of the tornado.
Illinois
F3	NE of Metropolis to NE of Hampton, Kentucky	Massac, Pope, Livingston (KY)	2035	unknown	At the north edge of Metropolis, a well-built log home was completely destroyed, with the roof and a wall thrown about a half-mile away. Another house nearby sustained major damage and four mobile homes were destroyed, along with garages and outbuildings. Part of a double wide mobile home blew into a church sanctuary. Six vehicles were tossed up to 100 yards away from where they originated, one of which landed in a pond. Hundreds of trees and power poles were snapped in this area. Intermittent tree damage occurred further east, and a radio tower and some power lines were downed near Bay City before the tornado crossed into Kentucky. In Kentucky, one mobile home was destroyed, and roofs were partially torn off of two houses. Eighteen homes sustained minor damage, consisting mostly of roofing and siding blown off. 20 barns were heavily damaged or destroyed. Six silos were destroyed before the tornado dissipated, including two of rebar-reinforced concrete construction. Two people were injured.
F0	S of Radom	Washington	2155	unknown	Brief tornado remained over open country and did not cause damage.
F0	S of Valley City	Pike	2225	unknown	Brief tornado remained over open country and did not cause damage.
F0	Northside of Chicago	Cook	2300	unknown	Small tornado occurred near Loyola University. Trees and tree limbs were downed before the tornado moved out over Lake Michigan.
Kentucky
F1	W of Sheridan to NE of Dixon	Crittenden, Webster	2135	40 mi (64.37 km)	In Crittenden County, an unanchored mobile home was destroyed, along with several outbuildings. Several houses sustained minor roof damage, and others were damaged by falling trees. The tornado entered Webster County and struck Dixon, where two houses were severely damaged, and numerous others sustained minor damage. There was extensive roof damage at both an apartment building and a grocery store. Numerous trees and power lines were downed along the path.
F1	Whitesville	Daviess	0048	4 mi (6.44 km)	In Whitesville, several small outbuildings were destroyed, and several telephone poles were snapped off. A number of houses sustained minor damage, and a mobile home and a modular home had extensive roof damage.
F1	SE of Oscar	Ballard	unknown	2 mi (3.22 km)	One house sustained roof damage, and a tree limb fell on its porch. Two empty grain bins were blown away, one of which was found 0.25 mi (402.34 m) away. An auger was damaged, and a nearly full propane tank was rolled off its blocks. A damage path was visible through a soybean field, and several trees were snapped as well.
F0	E of Sedalia	Graves	unknown	unknown	A large tree was downed, along with small pieces of vegetation.
Tennessee
F1	N of Jackson	Madison	0105	unknown	One house had its front porch torn off, and several other houses and barns sustained roof damage. Several trees were knocked down, and some of them fell on houses.
Arkansas
F0	SE of Rush	Marion	unknown	0.3 mi (482.80 m)	Damage limited to a few trees. Funnel cloud only touched down because it was on a hilltop.
F1	SE of Myron	Izard	unknown	3.7 mi (5.95 km)	Dozens of trees were snapped or uprooted.
F1	S of Ash Flat	Izard, Sharp	unknown	8 mi (12.87 km)	Damage in Izard County was limited to trees that were snapped or uprooted. In Sharp County, tornado damaged several houses, with mostly roof damage noted. A mobile home and recreational vehicle were overturned, and another mobile home was partially destroyed. The tornado also snapped or uprooted dozens of trees before dissipating.
F2	E of Saddle to NW of Dalton	Fulton, Sharp, Randolph	unknown	13 mi (20.92 km)	In Fulton County, the tornado destroyed a house, and caused damage to several others. Hundreds of trees were downed, with one tree landing on a pickup truck. The tornado then entered Sharp County and tracked south of Wirth, where two barns were heavily damaged, and several houses sustained minor damage. Three stock trailers were also overturned, and power poles were downed as well. Minor tree damage occurred near Dalton before the tornado dissipated.
F0	SW of Optimus	Stone	unknown	5.2 mi (8.37 km)	Tornado remained in the Ozark National Forest, where several trees were snapped or uprooted.
Sources: SPC Storm Reports for 09/22, Springfield office, St. Louis Office Birmingham office Paducah office Huntsville office, Little Rock office, Chicago office

=== September 23 event ===
F#	Location	County	Time (UTC)	Path length	Damage
Tennessee
F0	SE of Clarksville	Montgomery	0920	0.2 mi (321.87 m)	Trees were downed, a utility pole was snapped, and a shed was destroyed.
Michigan
F0	N of Caledonia	Kent	2145	0.5 mi (804.67 m)	Some buildings sustained roof damage, and mobile homes were moved from their foundations.
F0	Muir	Ionia	2210	0.5 mi (804.67 m)	Limbs and rotten trees were downed.
Sources: SPC Storm Reports for 09/23, Grand Rapids office, Nashville office

== Non-tornadic events ==
In addition to the tornadoes, severe flooding has been reported in the region. Kentucky was hardest hit by the flooding due to continuous thunderstorms in many areas. Eight people died as a result of the flooding, including a father and his 1-year-old daughter, generally because of people driving cars or walking into floodwaters. In Arkansas, a woman died when a lightning bolt struck her boat and two other people were missing. Another fatality occurred in the state. Finally, in Illinois, an apparent lightning bolt spark a house fire that killed two women. Significant flooding was also reported in southern Indiana, northern Arkansas, southern Missouri, southern Illinois and West Tennessee.

The Louisville area was hard hit, with extensive damage in numerous neighborhoods. Some communities were only accessible by boat. Two of the local pumping stations were also flooded.

Sections of Interstate 64 and 65 in Kentucky were also closed due to the flooding.

== See also ==
- Weather of 2006
- List of North American tornadoes and tornado outbreaks
- List of F4 and EF4 tornadoes
  - List of F4 and EF4 tornadoes (2000–2009)
