= Zion Evangelical Church (Evansville, Indiana) =

Historic church in Indiana, United States

- U.S. National Register of Historic Places
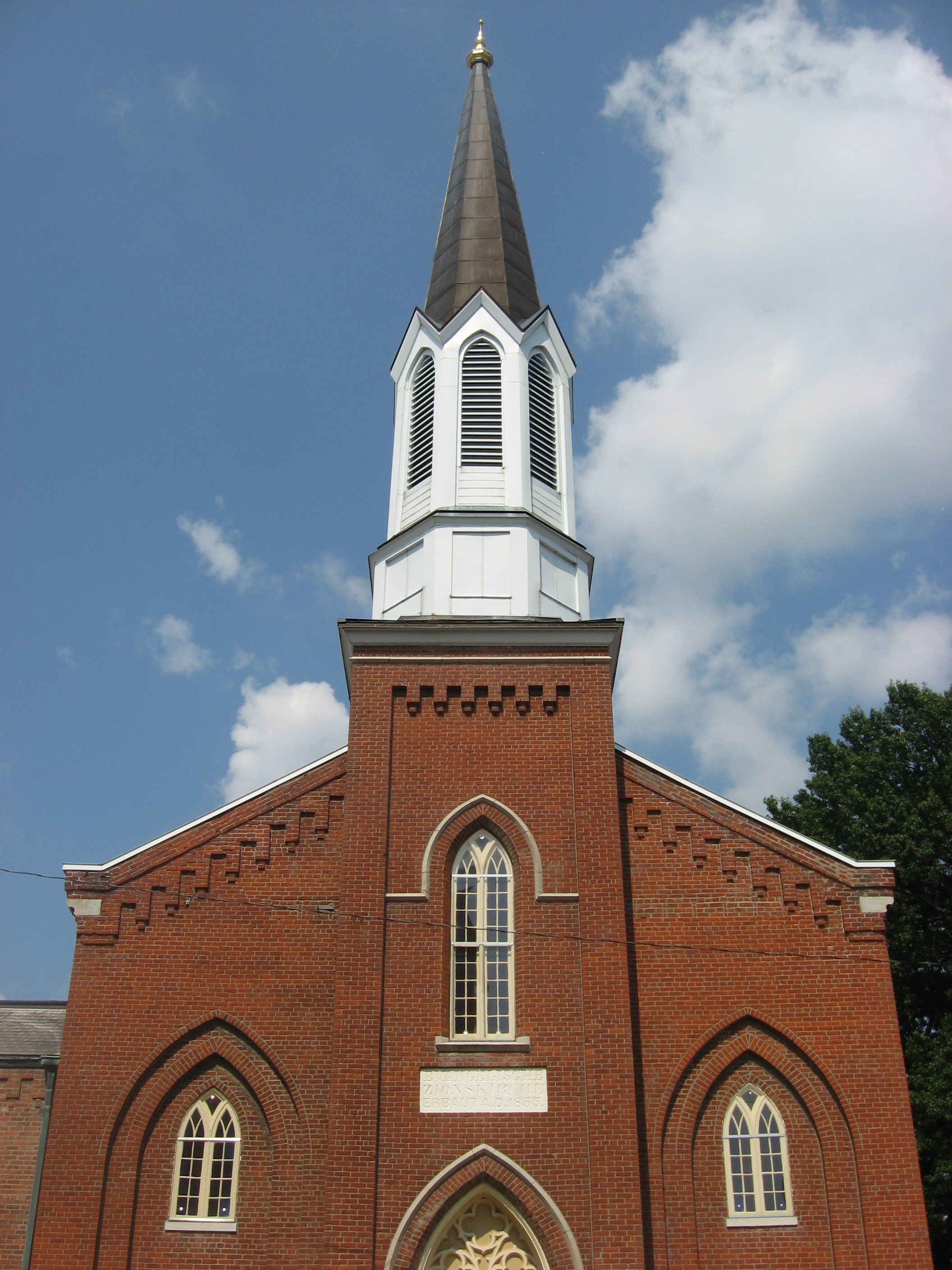
- Zion Evangelical Church, July 2011

- Location within Indiana Location within the United States
- Location: 415 NW 5th St., Evansville, Indiana
- Coordinates: 37°58′34″N 87°34′23″W
- Area: less than one acre
- Built: 1855
- Architectural style: Gothic Revival
- MPS: Downtown Evansville MRA
- NRHP reference No.: 82000129
- Added to NRHP: July 1, 1982

Zion Evangelical Church is a historic United Church of Christ church located in downtown Evansville, Indiana. It was built in 1855, and is a Gothic Revival style brick church. It features Gothic arched openings and an octagonal steeple.

It was listed on the National Register of Historic Places in 1982.

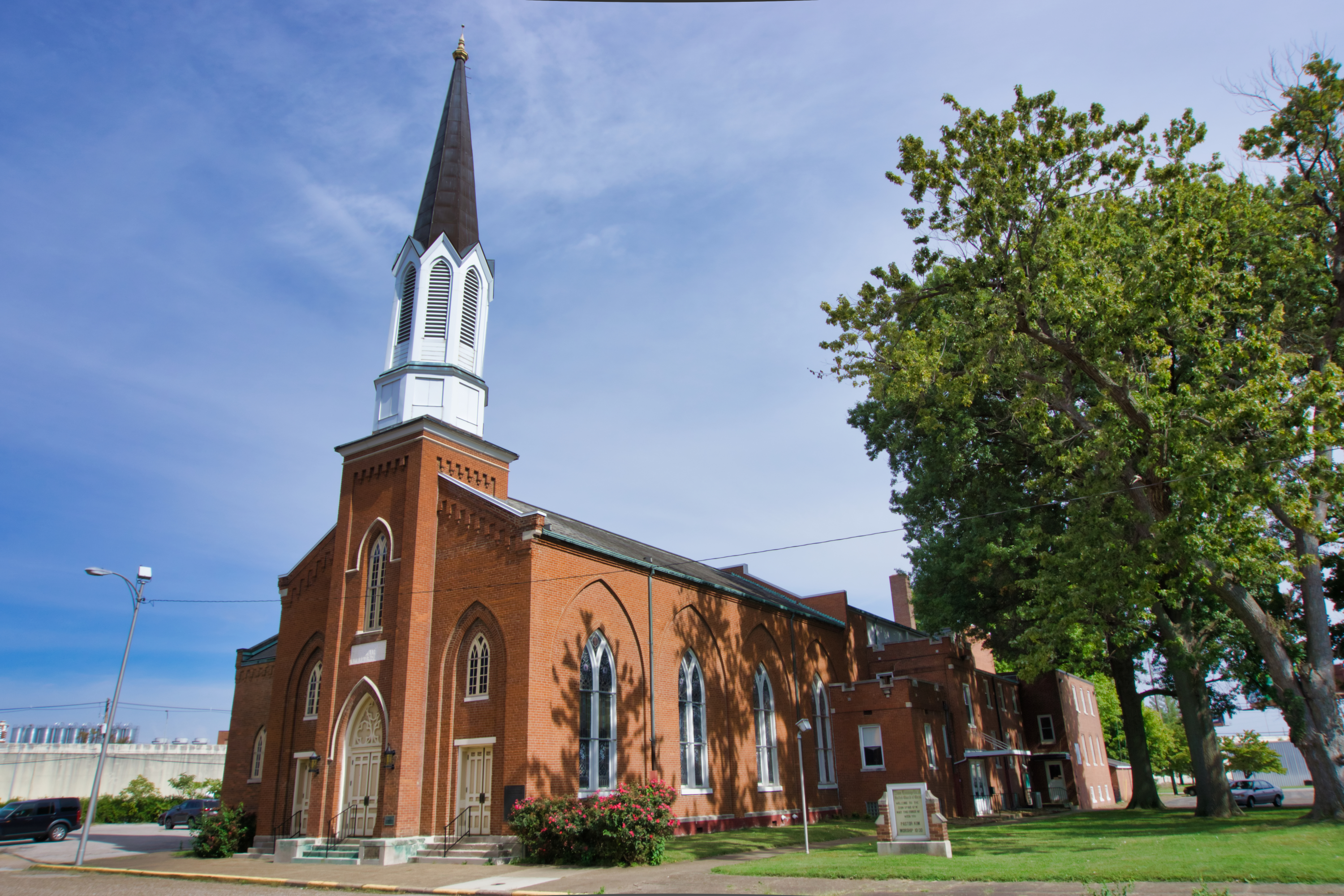
