= Zion Evangelical Lutheran Church (Flourtown, Pennsylvania) =

Church building in Pennsylvania, United States of America

Coordinates: 40.119807°N 75.214078°W

Zion Evangelical Lutheran Church is an Evangelical Lutheran Church in America church in Flourtown, Pennsylvania.

== Brief history ==
In 1819, the congregation worshiped in a building they constructed with the congregation that became St. Paul's United Church of Christ church as Union Church of Whitemarsh. In 1894 the congregations mutually separated with the Lutherans becoming Zion Evangelical Lutheran Church and the Reformed congregation becoming St. Paul's Reformed Church of Whitemarsh at Fort Washington, with a new building about a mile away.

The church currently operates a pre-school.
