= Evangelical Lutheran Church of Saddle River and Ramapough Building =

Historic church in New Jersey, United States

- U.S. National Register of Historic Places
- New Jersey Register of Historic Places
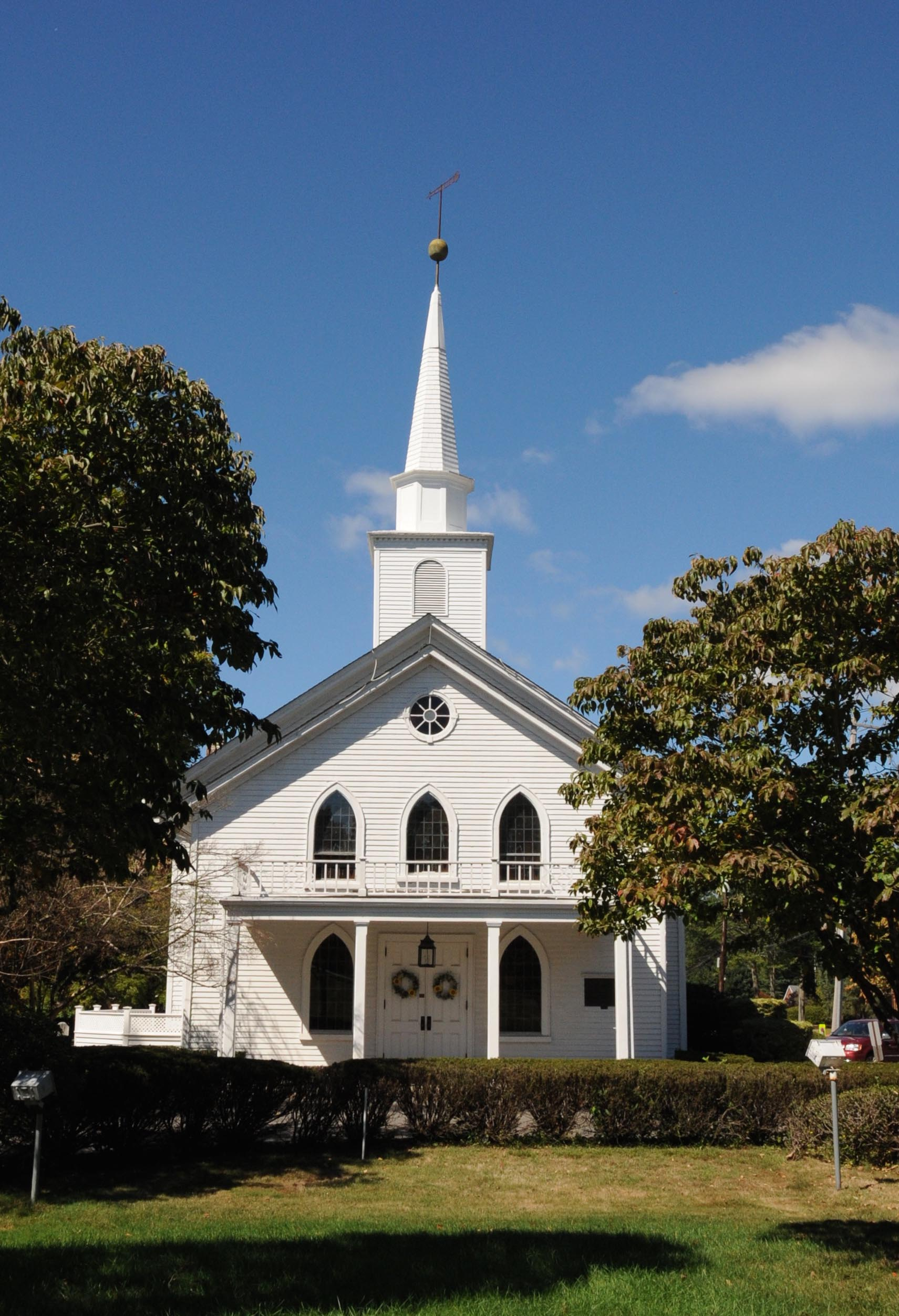

- Location within Bergen County, New Jersey Location within New Jersey Location within the United States
- Location: 96 E. Allendale Road, Saddle River, New Jersey
- Coordinates: 41°1′52″N 74°5′49″W
- Area: 1.9 acres (0.77 ha)
- Built: 1821
- Architect: Andrew Esler
- Architectural style: Federal, Vernacular Federal
- MPS: Saddle River MRA
- NRHP reference No.: 86001603
- NJRHP No.: 682

Significant dates
- Added to NRHP: August 29, 1986
- Designated NJRHP: June 13, 1986

The Evangelical Lutheran Church of Saddle River and Ramapough Building, also known as the Zion Evangelical Lutheran Church, is located at 96 E. Allendale Road in the borough of Saddle River in Bergen County, New Jersey, United States. The historic church was built from 1820 to 1821 by architect and master builder, Andrew Esler. It was documented by the Historic American Buildings Survey (HABS) in 1937. It was added to the National Register of Historic Places on August 29, 1986, for its significance in architecture, exploration/settlement, and religion. It was listed as part of the Saddle River Multiple Property Submission (MPS).

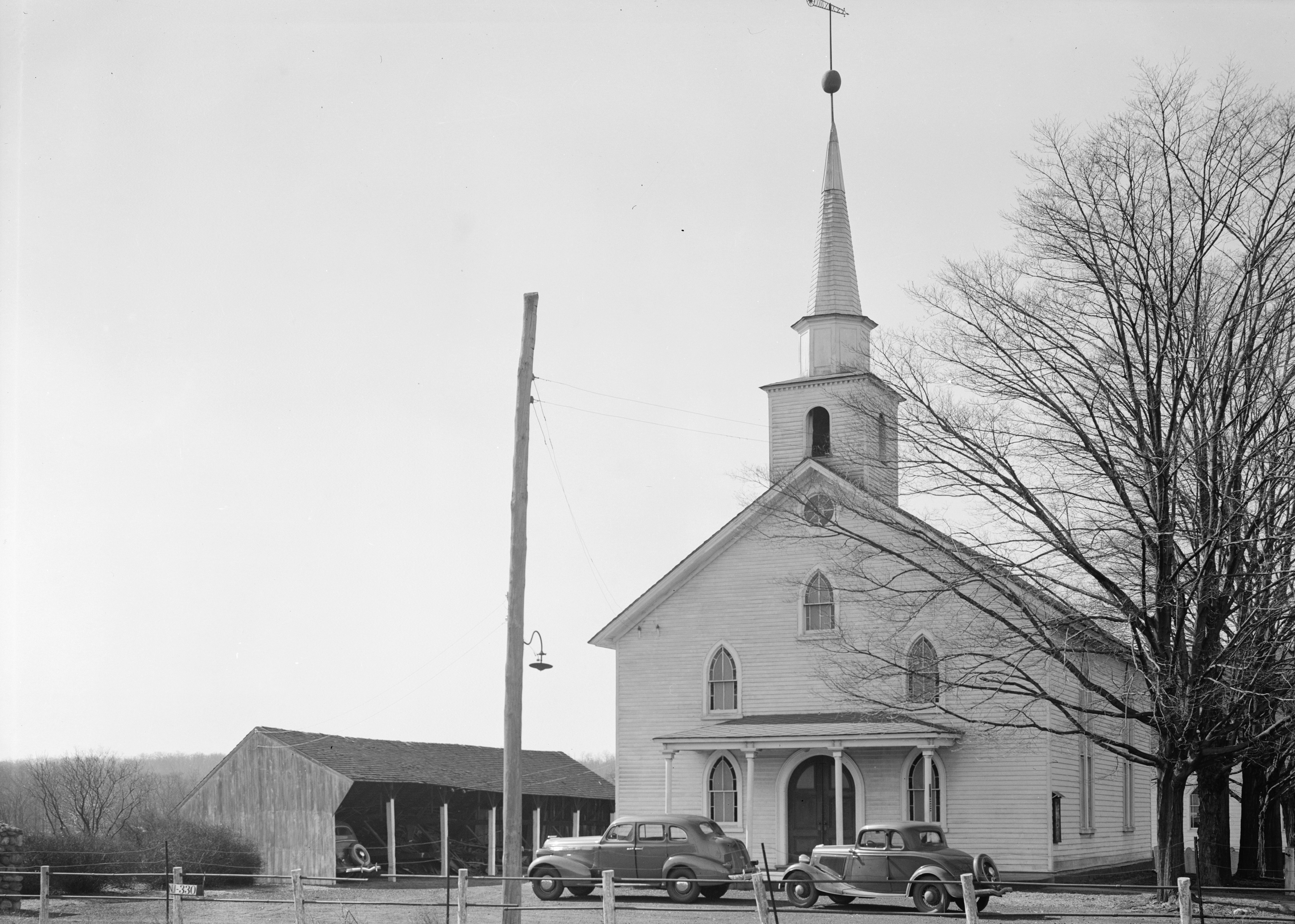
HABS image from 1937

== See also ==
- National Register of Historic Places listings in Bergen County, New Jersey
