= First Lutheran Church =

First Lutheran Church, or variants therof, can refer to:

== Canada ==
- First Evangelical Lutheran Church of Toronto

== United States (by state) ==
Alaska

- First Lutheran Church (Ketchikan, Alaska)

California

- First Lutheran Church of Venice, Los Angeles

Connecticut

- First Lutheran Church of the Reformation, New Britain, listed on the National Register of Historic Places
- First Lutheran Church, Ellington (formerly located in Rockville)

Iowa

- First Lutheran Church (St. Ansgar, Iowa)

Kentucky

- First Lutheran Church (Louisville, Kentucky), listed on the National Register of Historic Places

Massachusetts

- First Lutheran Church and School (Holyoke, MA)

Minnesota

- First Lutheran Church (Winthrop, Minnesota)

New York

- First Lutheran Church (Albany, New York)

Ohio

- First Reformed (now First Church of the Resurrection) and First Lutheran Church (Canton, Ohio) churches of Canton, Ohio, jointly listed on the National Register of Historic Places
- First Lutheran Church (Dayton, Ohio)
- First Lutheran Church (Springfield, Ohio)

South Dakota

- Bradley First Lutheran Church

Wisconsin

- First Lutheran Church (Middleton, Wisconsin)
