= Culture in New York's Capital District =

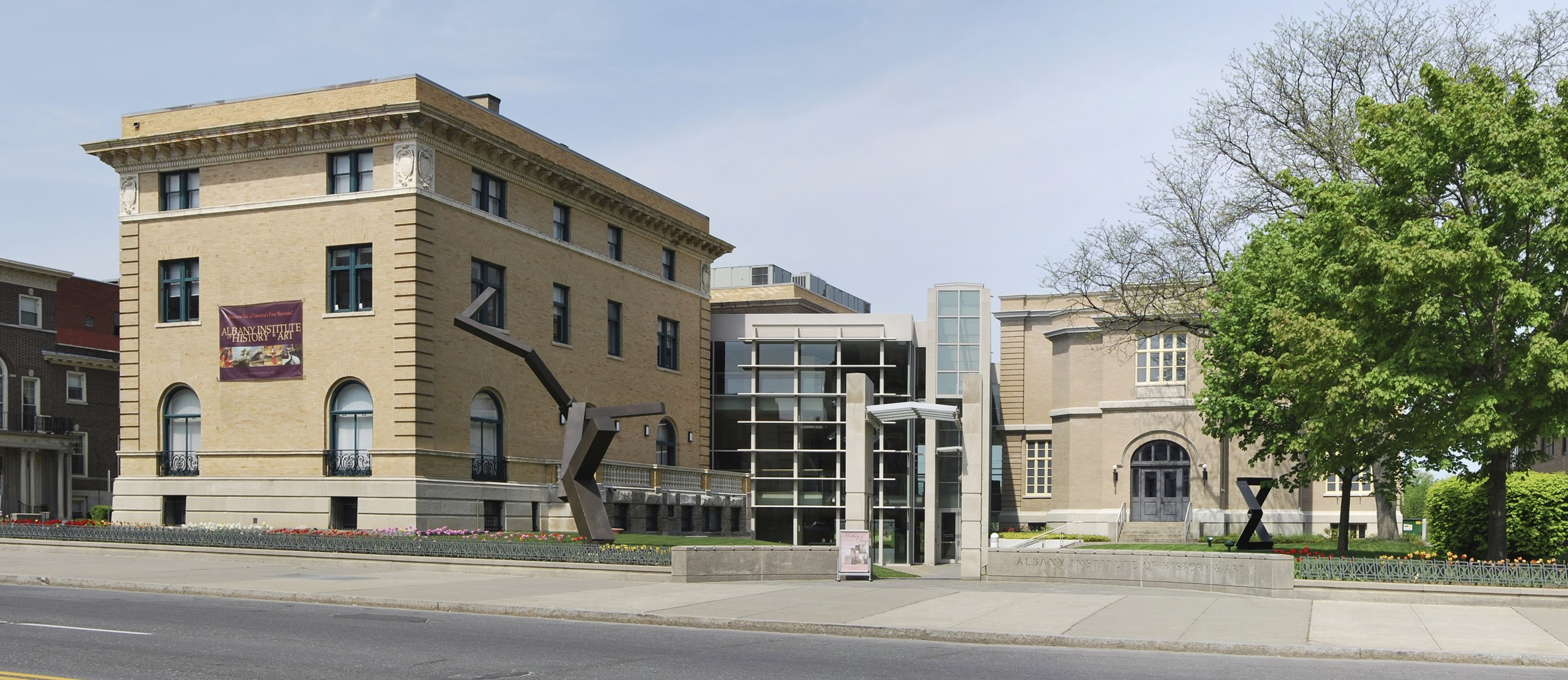
The Albany Institute of History and Art in Albany

The area of New York's Capital District, also known as the Albany metropolitan area, has seen prominent historical events, artistic creations, and unique contributions to the culture of the United States since the 17th century. The largest city in the area, Albany, consistently ranks high on lists of top cities/metro areas for culture, such as being 23rd in the book Cities Ranked & Rated. The Albany-Schenectady-Troy metro area ranked 12th among large metro areas, and Glens Falls ranked 12th among the small metro areas, in Sperling's Best Places, and Expansion Management (a monthly business magazine) gave the Albany-Schenectady-Troy area five Stars, its highest ranking, for quality of life features.

== Museums ==
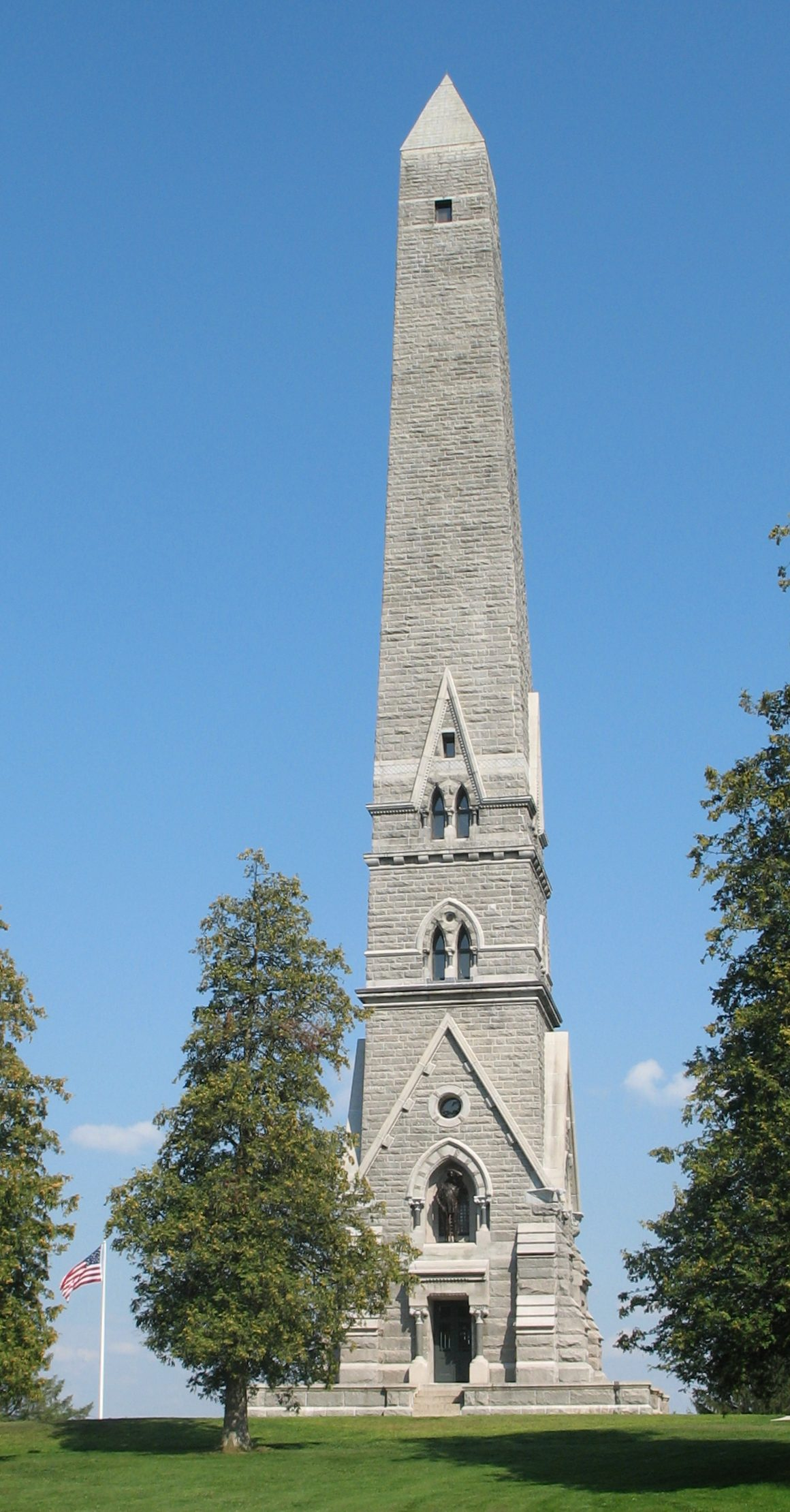
Saratoga Monument in Saratoga National Historical Park

The Capital District has many historical sites and museums covering a wide range of topics and time periods. The Albany Institute of History and Art founded in 1791 is one of the oldest museums in the nation, and the New York State Museum is the oldest and largest state museum in the nation. Many of the museums are historical sites themselves, such as Cherry Hill, the Ten Broeck Mansion, and the Schuyler Mansion in Albany, the Pruyn House in Colonie, Old Fort Johnson in Fort Johnson, and the Hart-Cluett Mansion in Troy. The Crailo State Historic Site in the city of Rensselaer was built in the early 18th century and is a museum of colonial New Netherland history. Other historical sites and museums chronicle historic events of national importance from the Revolutionary War such as the Saratoga National Historical Park in Saratoga County and the Bennington Battlefield State Historic Site in Rensselaer.

The Children's Museum of Science and Technology (The Junior Museum) in North Greenbush, the Burden Iron Works in Troy, and the Schenectady Museum in Schenectady are three museums that are focused on the technological and scientific history of the region. The Schenectady Museum also has a planetarium, as does the Albany Heritage Area Visitors Center in Albany. Though the Dudley Observatory, in Schenectady, is no longer a working observatory it still remains the oldest independent organization in the United States supporting astronomy research and has one of the finest astronomy libraries in world.

Some museums in the area cover a specific topic such as the National Bottle Museum in Ballston Spa, or the Throop Drug Store Museum at the Albany College of Pharmacy. The Empire State Aerosciences Museum in Glenville, which in addition to air and space exhibits has the most extensive aviation library in New York. In Saratoga Springs is the Saratoga Automobile Museum covering the historical, technological, social, and economic impact of the automobile. Some of the museums in the region are unique, such as the Professional Wrestling Hall of Fame and Museum in Amsterdam, it is the only brick-and-mortar Hall of Fame for that sport. The National Museum of Dance and Hall of Fame in Saratoga Springs is the only museum in the United States dedicated to American professional dance.

The Capital District has many museums that cover the history of specific racial, ethnic, or religious groups. The Iroquois Indian Museum in Schoharie County documents the history and culture of the original inhabitants of the Capital District; while the Irish American Heritage Museum in Downtown Albany is the only museum dealing with Irish heritage in the United States. The Shaker Museum in Old Chatham, New York, formerly called Shaker Museum and Library, and the Watervliet Shaker Historic District in Colonie deal with the religious group of Shakers and their impact on the region; Shaker Museum | Mount Lebanon manages New Lebanon, the first organized and structured Shaker village, while the Watervliet site which the Shaker Heritage Society manages was the first place Shakers settled in the United States.

There are also many places of interest to learn about the natural landscape of the Capital District, such as Howe Caverns in Schoharie and the Albany Pine Bush Discovery Center in Albany. Lester Park in Greenfield, is a site owned by the New York State Museum, it is a 490 million year old fossil seafloor.

The USS Slater (DE-766), the only escort destroyer from World War II still afloat, and a reconstruction of Henry Hudson's Half Moon are docked at Albany as floating museums.

== Art ==
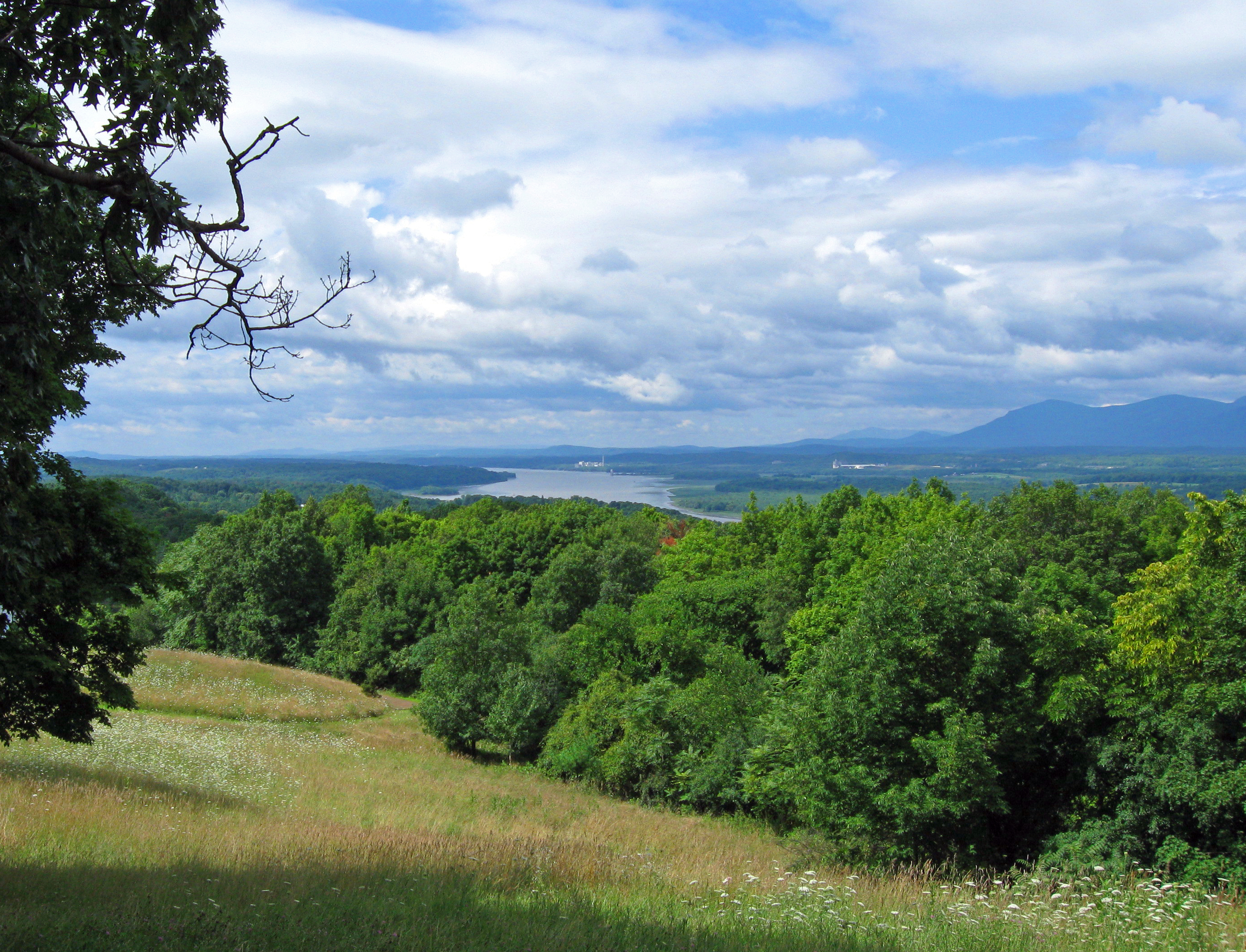
Views like this from Olana inspired Frederic Edwin Church, of the Hudson River School

There are several art galleries of different genres in the Capital District; most are galleries featuring work by local artists. Some have multimedia presentations and classes for locals, such as the Arts Center of the Capital Region in Troy, and the Albany Center Gallery in downtown Albany, which exhibits works by local artists within a 100-mile (160 km) radius of that city. The Arkell Museum in Canajoharie features American artists such as Georgia O'Keeffe, along with history of the Mohawk Valley. The Empire State Plaza in Albany has one of the most important state collections of modern art in the nation. Yaddo in Saratoga Springs and the Olana State Historic Site in Greenport, have natural and architectural works of art and have been used by artists of landscapes such as those of the Hudson River School. The Hyde Collection in Glens Falls is more of a formal art museum and includes works by Botticelli, Degas, Picasso, Raphael, Rembrandt, Renoir, and Van Gogh.

Several of the area's colleges and universities have art museums open to the public displaying art produced locally, nationally, and internationally. These include the Esther Massry Gallery at The College of Saint Rose, Frances Young Tang Teaching Museum and Art Gallery at Skidmore College; the University Art Museum at the University at Albany, SUNY; and the Opalka Gallery at the Sage College of Albany.

== Performing arts ==
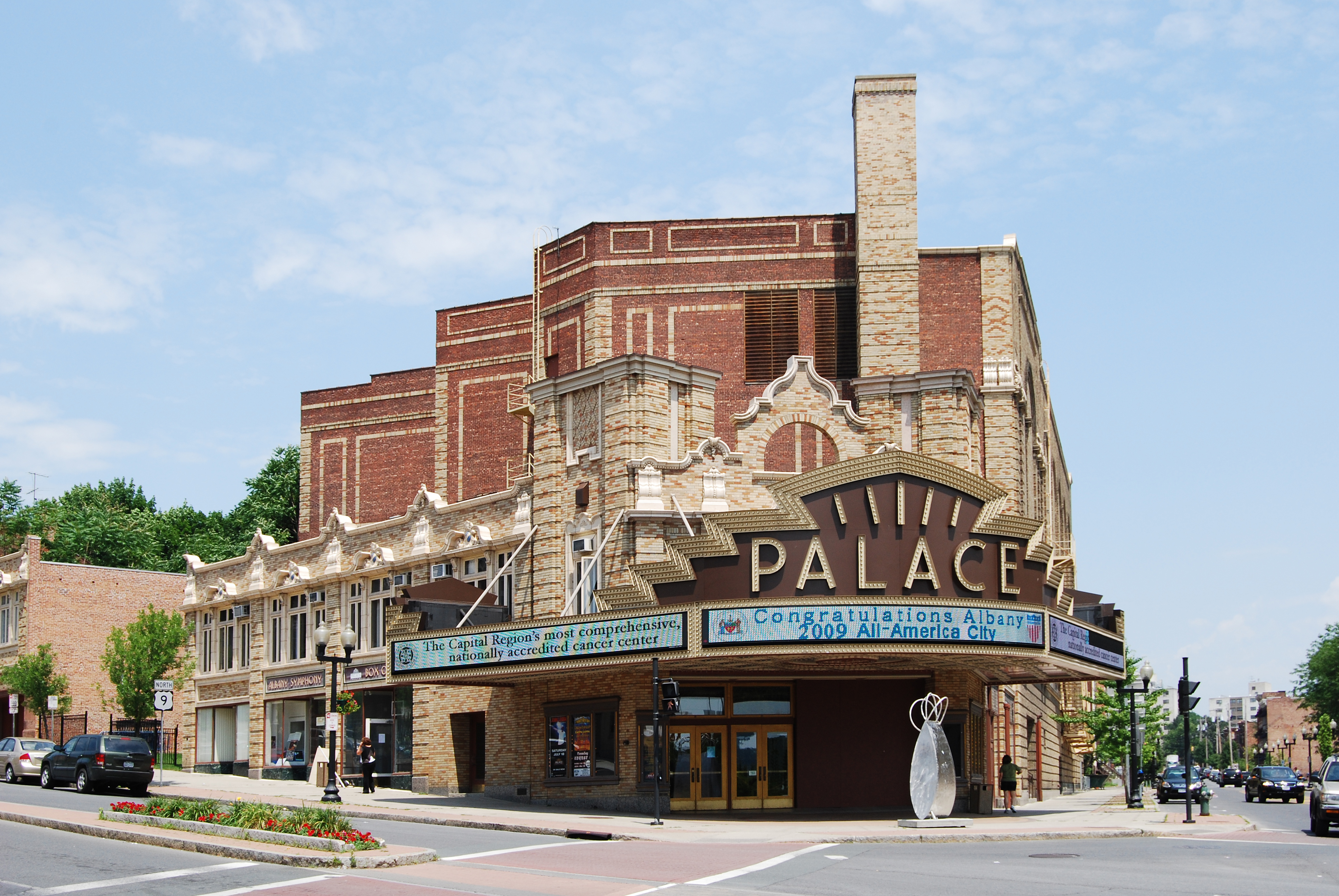
The Palace Theatre in Albany

The Capital District is home to many venues for the performing arts, some very old and some very new. Some are owned by municipalities or the state, such as the Times Union Center (owned by Albany County), the Palace Theatre (owned by the city of Albany), or the Saratoga Performing Arts Center (SPAC) and the Egg (both owned by the state of New York).

The Times Union Center is the largest venue, originally called the Knickerbocker Arena. It opened on January 30, 1990, with a performance by Frank Sinatra. In 1996, The Grateful Dead released a concert album from their March 1990 performances titled Dozin' at the Knick. Some of the venues, such as Proctor's Theatre in Schenectady and the Palace Theatre in Albany are quite old and started off in the days of vaudeville. Proctor's and the Palace have evolved into hosting dance, ballet, opera, symphony orchestra, and contemporary music performances such as Proctor's hosting of Mariah Carey's filming of her 1993 Thanksgiving NBC Special. The Cohoes Music Hall, the WAMC's Performing Arts Center (The Linda) in Albany, and the Troy Savings Bank Music Hall are three smaller venues also in buildings as old as Proctor's and the Palace.

The Egg in Albany and SPAC in Saratoga Springs are newer venues for concerts, ballet, and orchestra performances both constructed during Nelson Rockefeller's tenure as governor of New York. In addition to outside acts performing in the region, there are local ones as well. The Albany Symphony Orchestra performs at the Palace and the Troy Savings Bank Music Hall, among other local venues, and a few outside the region as well. The Capital Repertory Theatre in Albany and the New York State Theatre Institute (NYSTI) in Troy are local groups with their own performing space. Many local colleges have performing arts spaces as well; one of the newest and most sophisticated is the Experimental Media and Performing Arts Center (EMPAC) at Rensselaer Polytechnic Institute (RPI) in Troy.

== Festivals ==
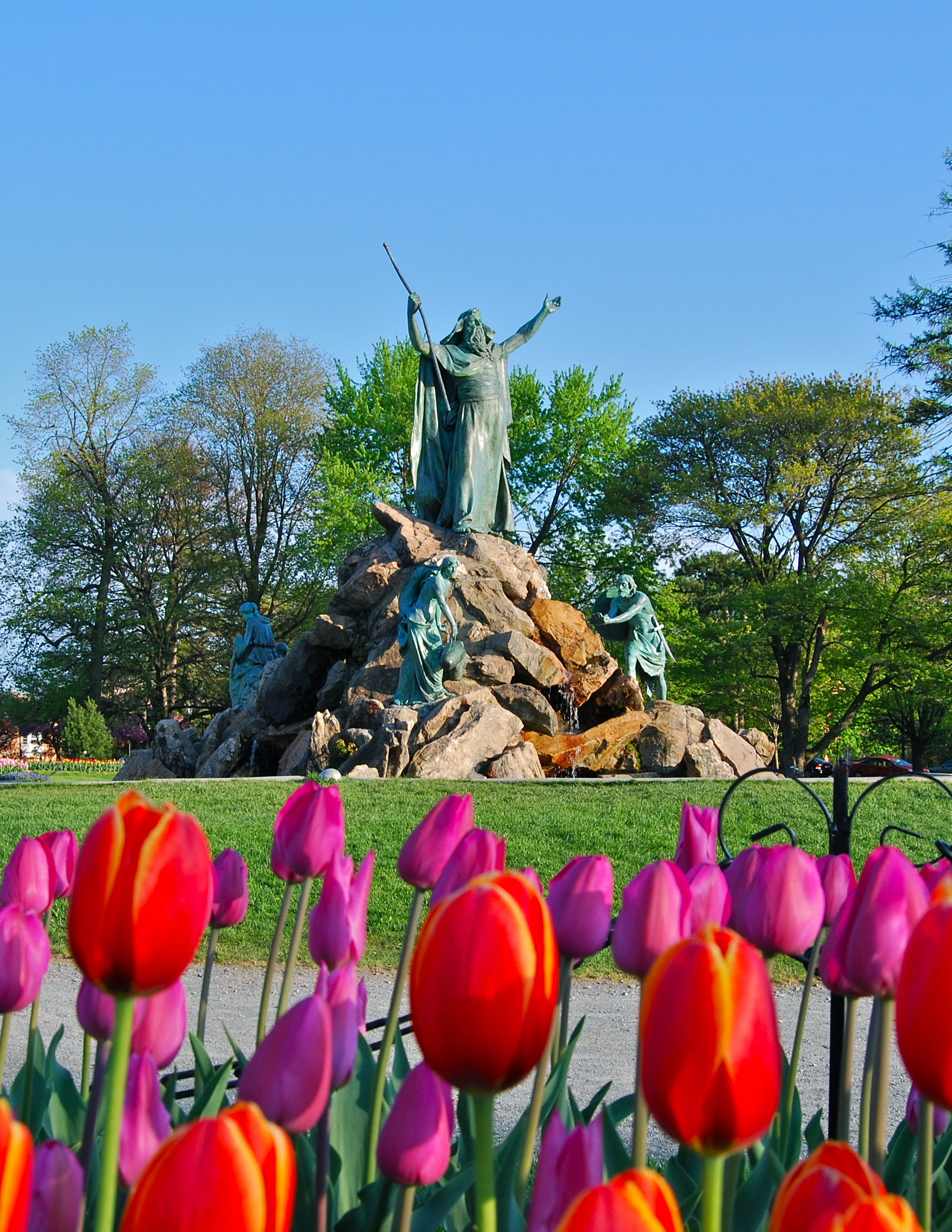
The King Fountain in Washington Park in Albany during the Tulip Fest

One of the largest events in the Capital District is the Tulip Fest held in Albany every spring at Washington Park. The tradition stems from when Mayor Erastus Corning 2nd got a city ordinance passed declaring the tulip as Albany's official flower on July 1, 1948. In addition, he sent a request to Queen Wilhelmina of the Netherlands to name a variety as Albany's tulip. On July 11, 1948, her reply was "Her Majesty gladly accepts the invitation to designate a tulip as the official flower of Albany." She picked the variety "Orange Wonder", a bronzy orange shaded scarlet. The first Tulip Fest was celebrated the next year on May 14, 1949, with opening ceremonies still carried on today as tradition, such as the sweeping of State Street and the crowning of a Tulip Queen. The African-American tradition of Pinksterfest, whose origins are traced back even further to Dutch festivities, was later incorporated into the Tulip Fest.

Another large festival in Albany is the Capital Pride Parade and Festival, a major gay pride event held each June, attended by an estimated 30,000 spectators annually from across Upstate New York.

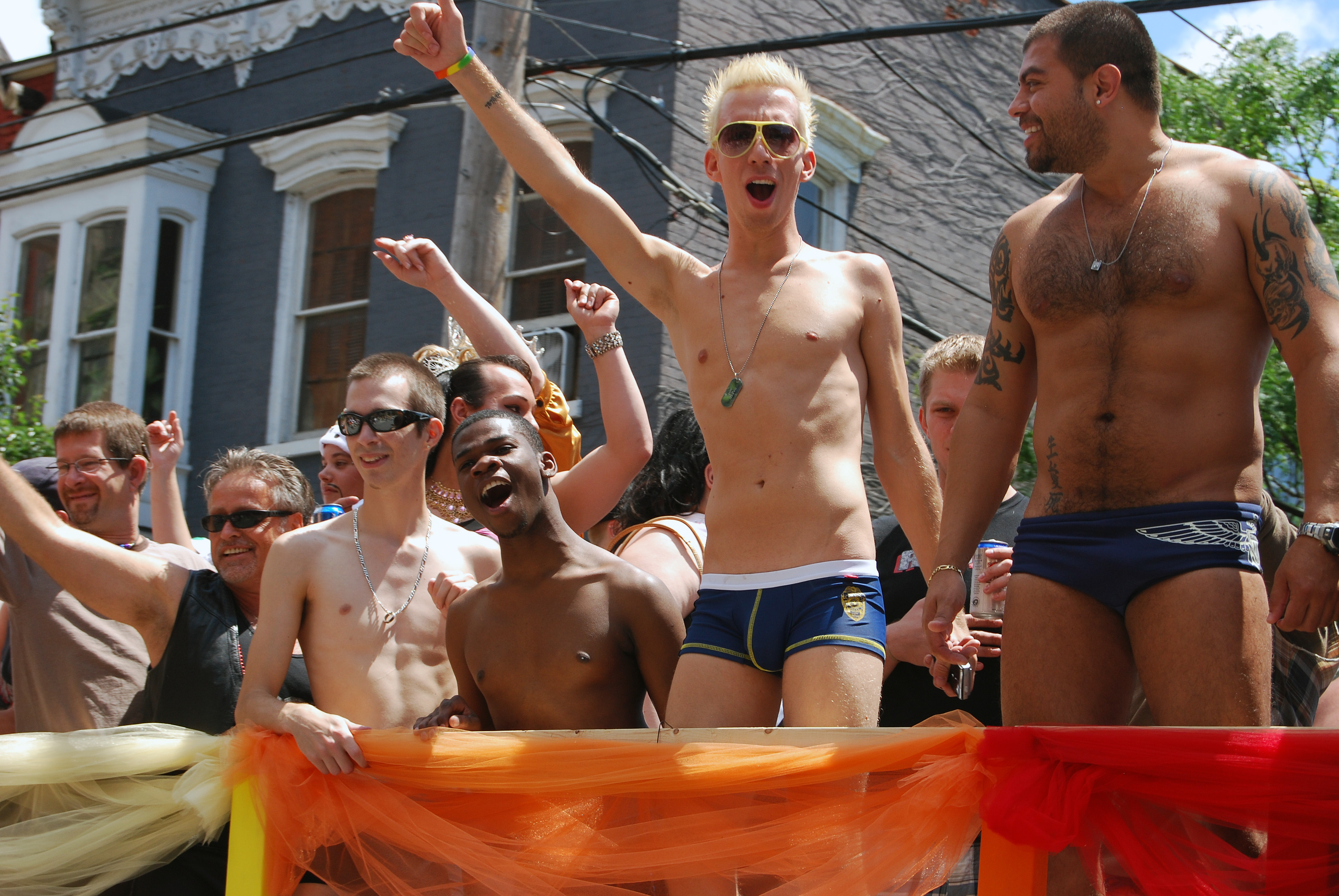
The Capital Gay Pride Parade and Festival is the largest celebration of LGBTQ culture in Upstate New York.

The largest Flag Day parade is held every year in Troy. The 42nd annual parade in 2009 is along a two-mile-long route. First Night celebrations are held in Saratoga Springs, while in 2006 Albany decided to eliminate its First Night celebrations in favor of a new "Albany WinterFestival" (WinterFest).

Other major festivals in the Capital District include ethnic festivals. The Albany LatinFest has been held since 1996 and drew 10,000 to Washington Park in 2008. In Schenectady, the growing Guyanese community has celebrated the Guyanese Family Fun Day for several years in that city's Central Park. PolishFest is a three-day celebration of Polish culture in the Capital District, held in the town of Colonie for the past eight years.

== Literature and cinema ==
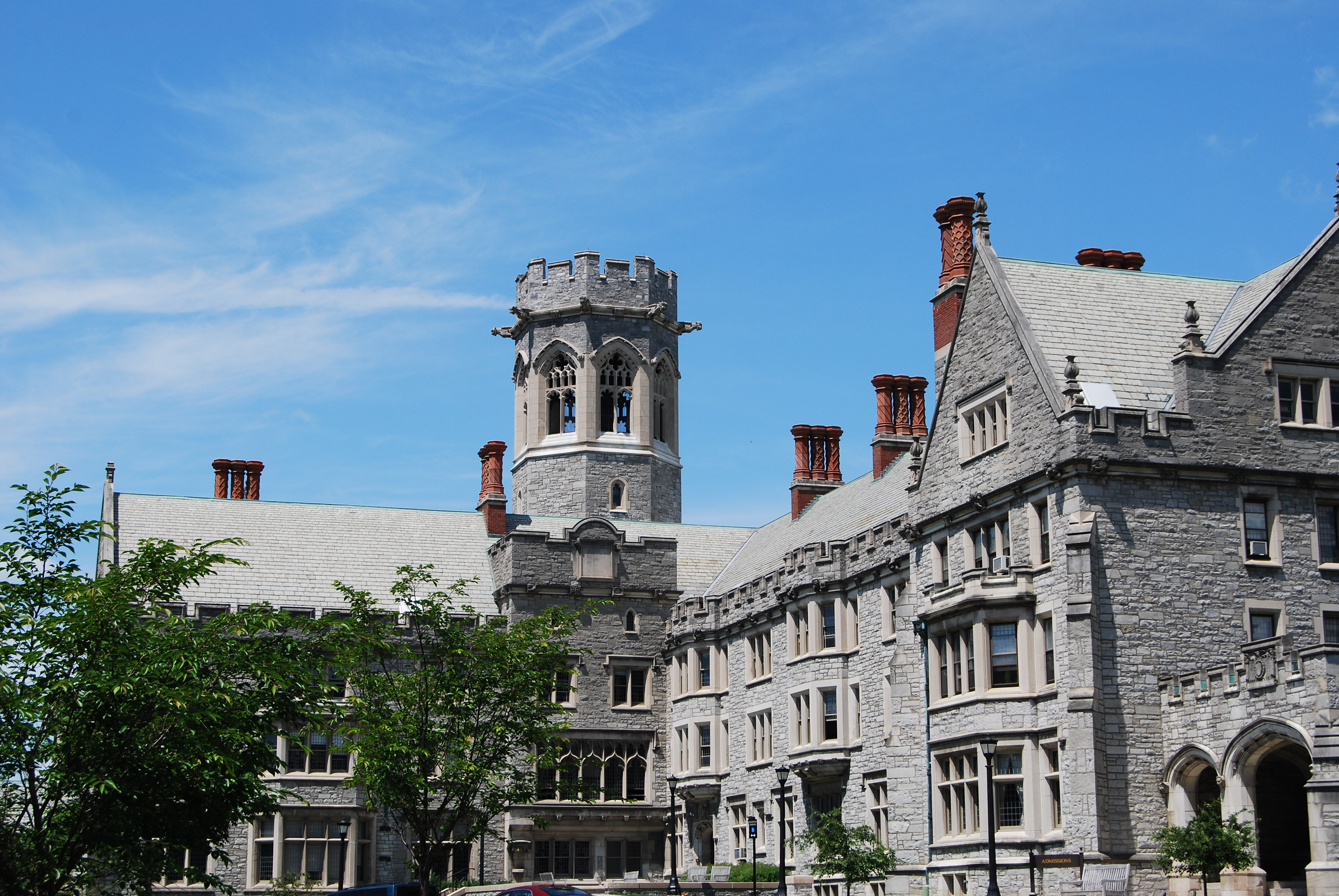
Emma Willard School was a film location for Scent of a Woman and The Emperor's Club

The Capital District has its share of historical and tourist non-fiction books; the area however has also seen a great deal of fiction written by its natives and about the region. Some of these have been turned into movies, such as Ironweed by William Kennedy and Last of the Mohicans by James Fenimore Cooper. Ironweed is but one of a series of books by Kennedy that take place in Albany. The series is often referred to as the "Albany Cycle". The elusive author Trevanian also grew up in Albany and wrote The Crazyladies of Pearl Street, about Albany's North Albany neighborhood along Pearl Street; commentators considered it a semi-autobiographical memoir. Gregory Maguire, author of Wicked: The Life and Times of the Wicked Witch of the West which was source for the Broadway hit Wicked, also grew up in North Albany. Richard Lipez, under the pen-name Richard Stevenson has written nine books (four of which have been made into movies) in a series about the openly gay detective Donald Strachey, which take place in Albany.

From the earliest days of silent movies the Capital District has been used for filming motion pictures. Some early movies filmed in the area were Last of the Mohicans in 1911, The Sign Invisible (1918), and Impossible Catherine (1919), all of which were filmed in Lake George. Saratoga, produced in 1937, was shot at the Saratoga Race Course. In the 1990s, after several movies were filmed in the area, the marketing moniker "Hollywood on the Hudson" was promoted for the area, but never gained popularity, though it still is used by some promoters, especially for Troy.

More recently there have been many movies that have had parts filmed in the Capital District including The Bostonians (1984), Ironweed (1987), Scent of a Woman (1992), The Age of Innocence (1993), The Horse Whisperer (1998), The Emperor's Club (2002), The Time Machine (2002), Seabiscuit (2003), War of the Worlds (2005), and Taking Woodstock (2009). Most recently Downtown Albany was the site of filming for Salt starring Angelina Jolie, and the action-comedy The Other Guys starring Will Ferrell and Mark Wahlberg.

== Religious life ==
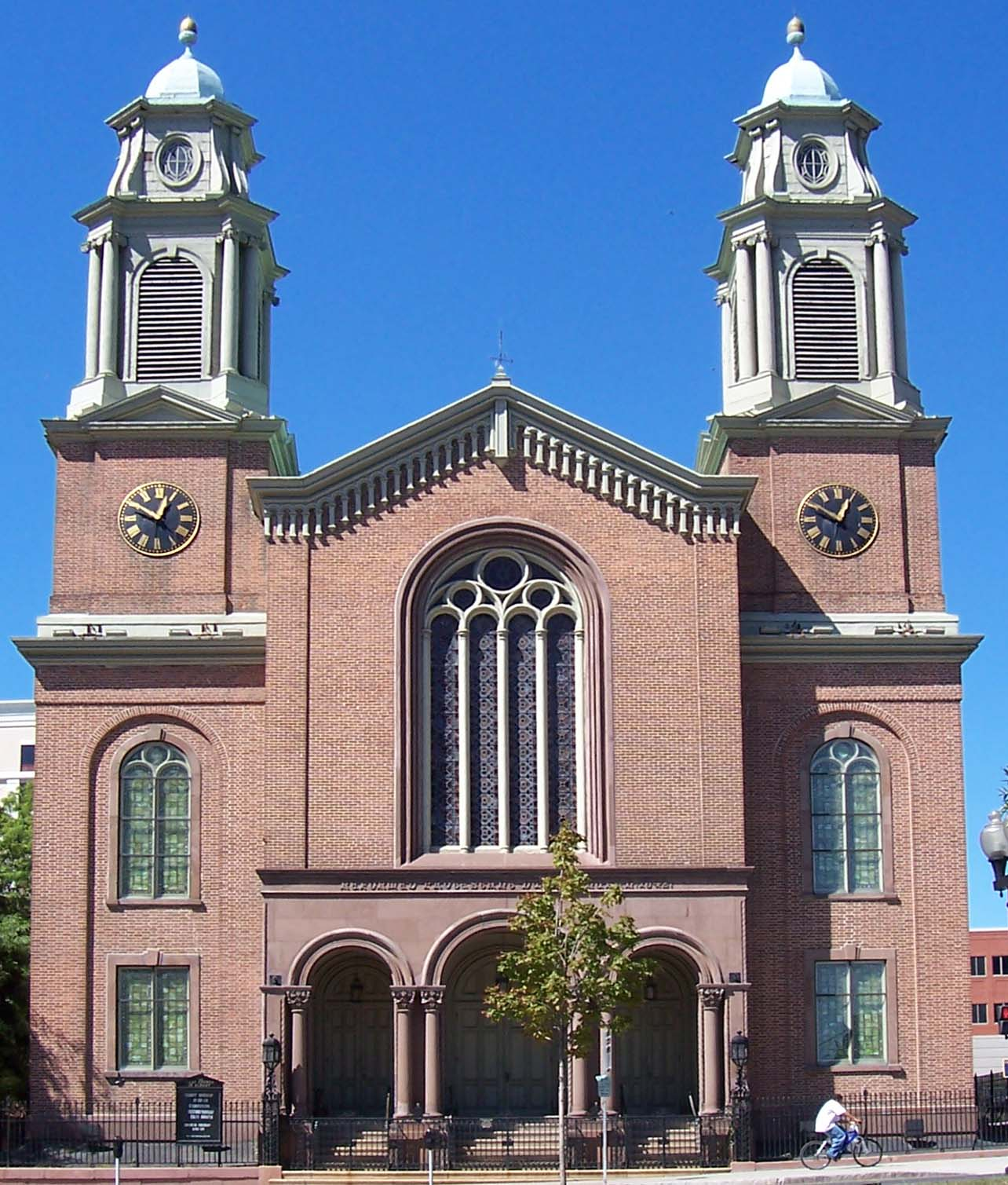
First Church in Albany, a Reformed church, the oldest place of worship in the Capital District

The Capital District, and Albany in particular, is home to many of the oldest congregations and places of worship in the United States. The Dutch Reformed, Episcopal, and Lutheran congregations date back to the 17th century. The area, as a Dutch colony originally, was dominated by the Dutch Reformed church from the beginning of settlement. The congregation of the First Church in Albany is the second oldest congregation in the state of New York. The pulpit was imported from the Netherlands in 1656 and is the oldest pulpit in the United States. Shortly after being constructed a memorial service was held for Alexander Hamilton here, and Theodore Roosevelt attended services here while Governor of New York. The First Lutheran Church in Albany is the oldest congregation of the Evangelical Lutheran Church in America, it began as a Dutch Lutheran church 360 years ago.

St. Peter's was the first Anglican church in New York west of the Hudson River, and the first Anglican church in the state north of the city of New York. The remains of Lord Howe, who died during the French and Indian Wars were interred under the vestibule; he is the only British Lord buried in the United States. In 1868 the newly formed Episcopal Diocese of Albany met in convention at St. Peter's to choose a bishop and William Doane, rector of St. Peter's, was chosen on December 3, he was consecrated as such on February 2, 1869, in St. Peter's. Albany remains the home of the mother church and cathedral of the Episcopal diocese of Albany: the Cathedral of All Saints with Bishop William Love as current bishop.

The Capital District is also home to the Roman Catholic cathedral and mother church, the Cathedral of the Immaculate Conception with Bishop Mark O'Connell as head of the Roman Catholic Diocese of Albany.

The oldest Black church in the Capital District is the Israel African Methodist Episcopal Church (Israel AME), it was established by Reverend William Cornish who was sent to Albany in 1828 by Bishop Richard Allen, founder of the AME denomination. The Israel AME was incorporated in 1829 and the current building on Hamilton Street dates from 1854. A state historic marker was placed in 1988 at the 160th anniversary celebrations, which also commemorates the church as a stop on the Underground Railroad.

A significant Jewish presence has existed in Albany since as early as 1658, and today includes many synagogues; there are two Reform, two Conservative, a Chabad-Lubavitch, an Orthodox, and one of the few Karaite synagogues outside Israel. Congregation Berith Sholom (Covenant of Peace), a synagogue in Troy, is the oldest continuously used synagogue in the state of New York, and the second oldest house of worship in the state outside of the city of New York,.

In addition, Albany is known for a landmark event in the history of American Reform Judaism: Rabbi Isaac Mayer Wise, one of the founders of Reform Judaism in the United States, first advocated his reforms at a synagogue in Albany, where he was Albany's first and only rabbi. Wise was also the teacher of one of only four Hebrew schools in the nation. In 1850 he came to blows with the congregation president and the police were called to quell the riot that started on the street. and this split with the existing synagogue he established in Albany the fourth Reform synagogue in the United States.

There is also a small population of Muslims in the city. The number of colleges and universities in the area help bring in more culturally diverse students, representing ranging religious beliefs. Most of the local colleges have respective Muslim Student Associations, for example. SUNY Albany even cancelled class for Eid al-Fitr and Eid al-Adha during the 2004–2005 school year, however it reverted that policy the following year due to low Muslim population.
