= First Evangelical Lutheran Church =

First Evangelical Lutheran Church may refer to:

- First Evangelical Lutheran Church (Fort Smith, Arkansas), listed on the US National Register of Historic Places (NRHP)
- First Evangelical Lutheran Church (Gypsum, Colorado), NRHP-listed
- First Evangelical Lutheran Church (Galveston, Texas), NRHP-listed in Galveston County, Texas
- First Evangelical Lutheran Church of Toronto, Ontario, Canada

== See also ==
- First Lutheran Church (disambiguation)
