= Caitlin Rose Sweet =

American ceramic artist

Caitlin Rose Sweet is an American ceramic artist.

Sweet's work includes "anatomical" cannabis pipes and LBTQ themes. She was featured in a queer-themed "Rough Trade" exhibition at Allegheny College and an exhibition at Albany Center Gallery in which Sweet's work was described as containing "allusions to anatomy and domesticity [which] examine how images and objects establish or perpetuate cultural identities."

Her 2016 exhibition "Snake in the Grass," was inspired by Hieronymus Bosch's 15th-century The Garden of Earthly Delights, with a "queer-feminine overhaul" according to Vice. This, and other pieces, have been described as "sculptural pieces that impressively mix elements of grotesque and feminine".

Sweet is from a "small town in America" and her work "simultaneously embraces Americana and folk traditions while exposing the social constructs (and constraints) surrounding them". As of 2016, she resided in Brooklyn.
