= First Lutheran Church (Winthrop, Minnesota) =

- First Evangelical Lutheran Church
- First Lutheran Church
- 44°32′31″N 94°21′42″W
- Location: 213 N Hennepin St, Winthrop, Minnesota 55396
- Country: United States
- Denomination: Lutheran

History
- Former name: Swedish Lutheran Church
- Status: Church
- Founded: 1884
- Founder: C.M. Ryden

Architecture
- Functional status: Active
- Completed: 1904

Specifications
- Materials: Brick

Clergy
- Pastor: David F Winterfeldt

First Lutheran Church is a Lutheran church in Winthrop, Minnesota. The church is easily recognized by its tall steeple and its large stained glass windows.

The church is a member of the Evangelical Lutheran Church in America (ELCA), belonging to the Minnesota Valley Conference of the Southwestern Minnesota Synod.

== History ==
The church was established in 1884 by C.M. Ryden, who was the pastor at the nearby Bernadotte Lutheran Church in Bernadotte, Minnesota. Originally named Swedish Lutheran Church, the church changed its name to First Evangelical Lutheran Church in 1922. It is commonly known by the shortened name "First Lutheran Church".

Because of this shared history, First Lutheran and Bernadotte Lutheran are often considered sister churches.

== Buildings ==
The church has constructed and occupied two buildings since its inception.

=== Original building ===
The original church building was built in 1885 and was of wood construction. The building was sold to Zion Lutheran Church (another church in Winthrop) in 1904 for $500, and was then moved to the corner of Fourth and Renville streets. Around 1967, the building was torn down (Zion having moved to a different location at that point).

=== Current building ===
The current church building was built in 1904 and is of brick construction. It features a large organ and several large stained glass windows.

The organ was originally built by Hillgreen, Lane & Co. in 1910. It has undergone two rebuilds / upgrades since then, both by Hendrickson Organ Company. The first, referred to by the company as Opus 1, occurred in 1966. The second rebuild, referred to by the company as Opus 58, in 1982, was necessitated by the 1981 fire (see below).

A total of 14 large stained glass windows adorn the church building. Due to their age, in 2013 a project was launched to repair and restore the windows one at a time. The project is expected to last 4 to 6 years.

There have been two major additions to the building since its original construction: a 16-room educational and office wing on the rear / southeast corner and an entry way / coat room / basement stairwell on the front / west side.

==== 1981 Christmas Eve fire ====
The building experienced a fire in 1981, caused by a candle left burning on one of the stained glass window sills following the traditional Christmas Eve late-afternoon service. The fire was noticed by some passersby later that evening, and thus the damage caused by the fire itself was limited to the candle's general vicinity. The stained glass window and several nearby pews were complete losses.

Although the fire had been contained, it still caused extensive smoke damage to the building. This required the replacement of the carpeting, the sound system, and the hymnals, refurbishment of the organ, and repainting of the walls and ceiling. While the remaining pews were being refinished in a local barn as part of the repairs, the barn caught fire and was destroyed. As a consequence, all pews had to be replaced rather than just the initial few.

Worship services were held in the church basement for approximately one year while repairs were made.

== Former pastors ==
Former Pastors
Name	Start date	End date
Laurens Petrus Bergstrom	1887	?
A.F. Lunduist	?	?
E.A. Martell	?	1944
Lambert Engwall	1944	1972
Jares A. Brown	1972	1974
Dwight R. Johnson	1974	1985
James David Aronen	1985	1991
Paul Arthur Hesterberg	1991	2002
?	2002	?
