= Tulip Queen =

The Albany Tulip Queen and Court is a symbolic monarchy with a yearly coronation at the Tulip Festival, which takes place in May at Washington Park in Albany, New York annually. The Tulip Queen and her court serve as ambassadors of the city and engage in community service projects during their one-year term.

The Tulip Queen is selected through a process involving letters of recommendation and interviews by a selection committee. Women aged 18 to 24 are eligible for nomination. The selection of the Tulip Queen began as a beauty pageant, but for many years now the Queen and her court have been selected solely based on their community awareness, history of serving the community, and dedication to Albany. Along with the queen, four court members are selected to work throughout the City of Albany during the year. Each year the Queen and her court select a literacy project to implement in the City of Albany.

The crowning of the Tulip Queen starts with a short processional. First come the police, then the Albany Police Band playing bagpipes and drums, then a car containing last year's Tulip Queen and the current mayor. Next come a series of five cars each containing the five Tulip Queen finalists. After the processional, the mayor, each finalist, and few other people give speeches. The mayor reads a note that says who has won the Tulip Queen title. Finally, last year's Tulip Queen takes off her crown and puts it on the head of the new queen. The four finalist not crowned then become the court members. The Tulip Queen and her court serve their year of service until the next Tulip Festival takes place and a new queen is crowned.

The Albany Tulip Queen and Court are an asset to the city of Albany contributing thousands of hours each year in volunteer service.

== List of Albany Tulip Queens ==
Year	Tulip Queen	Tulip Court Members*	Notes
1949	Jeanne Coakley-Foley		First Queen
1950	Dorothy Ward-Scalone		d. 2007
1951	Judy Davenport		
1952	Jo Pangie-Henk		
1953	Peggy Retter Quinn		
1954	Lois Tewell-Woodworth		d.
1955	Suzanne Schuster		
1956	Nadia Spiak-Rymanowski		
1957	Carol Thorsen-Quackenbush		d. 2015
1958	Jane Armstrong -Snowden		
1959	Carol Smurl-Fields		
1960	Julie Kaiser		
1961	Patricia Ponticello		
1962	Nancy Self-Fornato		
1963	Joanne Gross		
1964	Maureen Glasheen		
1965	Bonnie Mason		
1966	Donna Vache-Fish		
1967	Karen Holtslag		
1968	Kathy McTague-Odabashian		
1969	Linda Kinnicutt-Lamb		
1970	Chritine Little-Daddario		
1971	Janet Schlegel-Larkin		
1972	Judi Murphy		
1973	Patty Mutterer		
1974	Jacqueline Regina-Dushensky		
1975	Blaine Ryan-Lynch		
1976	Patricia Murphy Moonan		
1977	Mary Kelly Illnicki		
1978	Marjorie Tetrault		
1979	Sandy Rector-Deluca		
1980	Elizabeth Miller-Grandjacquet		
1981	Stephanie Freeman-Cohen		
1982	Shelia McGrath-Babbino		
1983	Mary Theresa Moreland		
1984	Debra Capazucco-Peda		
1985	Jill Harris-Johnson		Current Selection Committee Member
1986	Andrea Palumbo		
1987	Anne Marie Dolan-Scott		
1988	Maria Mokhiber-Ziamandanis		
1989	Heather Britt-Subik		
1990	Diane Foley-Chowenhill		
1991	Kelly Hogan-Finelli		
1992	Jennifer Recene-Gallagher		
1993	Wendy Sims		
1994	Victoria Lee Palmer		
1995	Stacey Vennard-Kirk		
1996	Tamara Thorpe-Odem		
1997	Christina Roberts-Ryba		NYS Supreme Court Justice
1998	Katie O'Malley		Founder and owner of Katie O Weddings and Events
1999	Nichole Stack		
2000	Kelly Conlon		
2001	Amy Kaplan		Currently Selection Committee Co-Chair
2002	Jennifer Gould-Lobban		
2003	Kaylin Gross		
2004	Meredith Rose-Kelly		
2005	Amy Deitz		
2006	Amanda Benincasa		
2007	Amisha Gomes		
2008	Sarah Volk		Selection Committee Member
2009	Juliana Hernandez		
2010	Mishka Gilkes		
2011	Karen Colehour		
2012	Emily Finnegan		
2013 (65th)	Kate Bender	Meghan Cahill, Gigi Diffenback, Fendi Munoz, Alexis Osborne	Meghan Cahill Selection Committee Member
2014	Caitlin Whelan	Jillian Callanan, TaraMarie Crisafulli, Kasmira Wilkins, Meghan Yi	
2015	Alexandra Cronin	Morgan Heyward, Jacqueline Murphy, Eva Petkanas, Sarah Wilamowski	
2016	Adaviah Ward	Samantha Coons, Mariah Rickard, Racquel Saddler	
2017	Ashley Loggins	Erin Bryk, Kelly Phillips, Julianna Rauf, Amanda Volk	
2018	Sawyer Cresap	Katherine Donnelly, Xavia Francis, Natalie Joseph, Elizabeth Stenard	
2019	Emily Barcia-Varno	Parneet Kaur, Megan Morrill, Michaela Schramm	Reign ended July 18, 2020
2020	Kaya Rifenberg-Stempel	Kimberly Guzman-Reyes, Samantha Peck, Maya Wilson, Karina Wojnar	Reign began July 18, 2020
2021	Ashanti Bishop	Aadya Kaushik, Sierra Liotta, Allison Moser, Andrea Thomas	
2022	Sam Mills	Ashley Mayfield, Sakthi Muthukrishnan, Kathleen Nielsen, Meghan O'Neil	First non-binary Tulip Queen
2023	Olivia Owens	Mariah Carter, Victoria Clary, Haleigh Gaston, Jadan Rivera	

- The first several decades of the tradition did not honor the court in the way that it currently is. The court began to participate in events year round in the 1980s.
