= First Evangelical Lutheran Church (Gypsum, Colorado) =

Historic church in Colorado, United States

- U.S. National Register of Historic Places
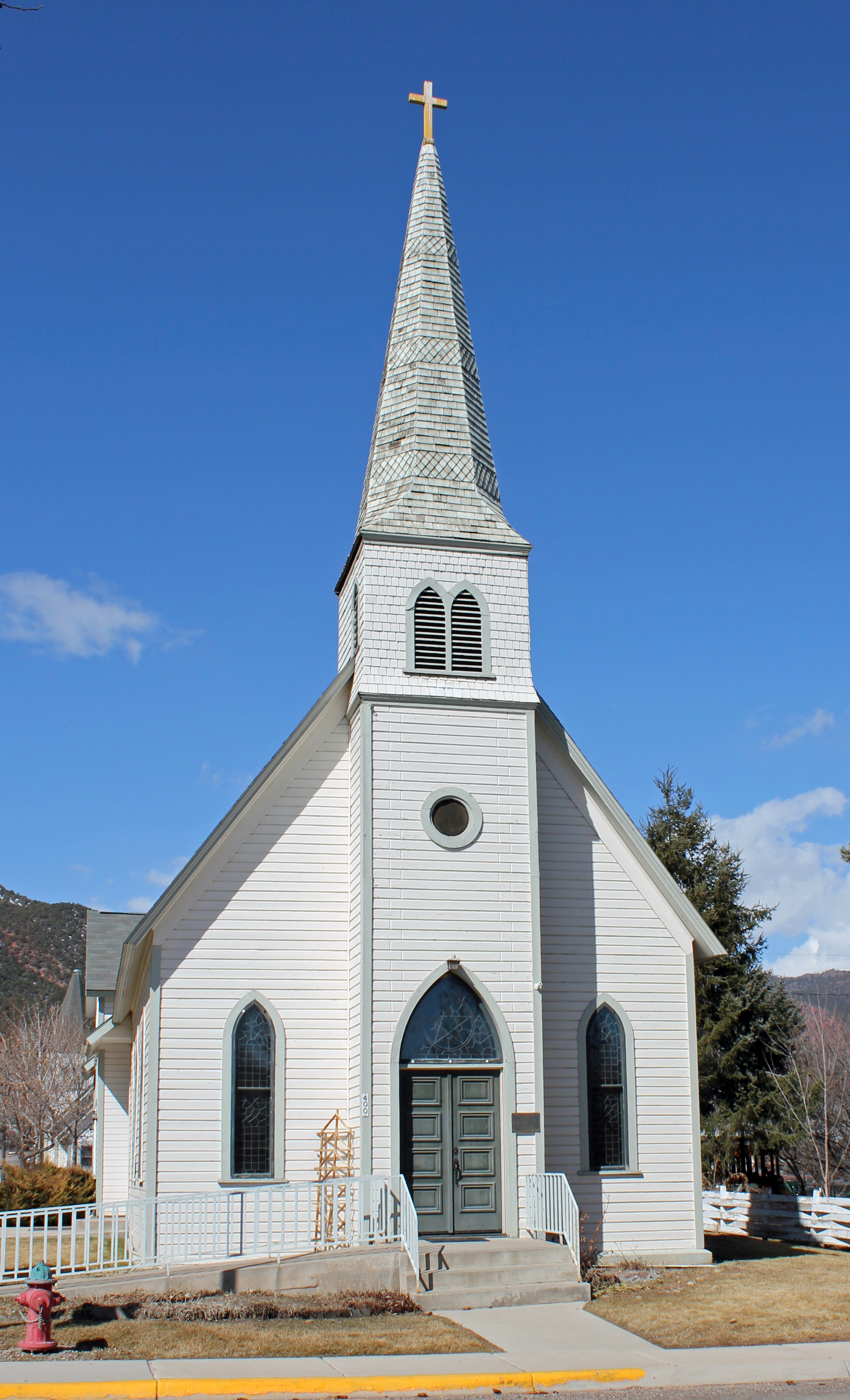
- The church in 2013.

- Location within Colorado Location within the United States
- Location: 400 2nd St., Gypsum, Colorado
- Coordinates: 39°38′44″N 106°57′08″W
- Area: less than one acre
- Built: 1890
- Architect: Broughton, S.
- Architectural style: Late Victorian, Gothic Revival
- NRHP reference No.: 93000576
- Added to NRHP: June 24, 1993

First Evangelical Lutheran Church (First Lutheran Church) is a historic church at 400 2nd Street in Gypsum, Colorado. It was built in 1890 and was added to the National Register in 1993.

The main part of the church is 36 by 25 feet (11.0 m × 7.6 m) in plan.

Iglesia Pentecostal Dios De La Montaña (Principe De Paz) is a church that started on the 2nd of May in the year 2014, here at the same First Lutheran Church.
