= Pinkster =

Pre- Emancipation African cultural festival that began in Albany NY

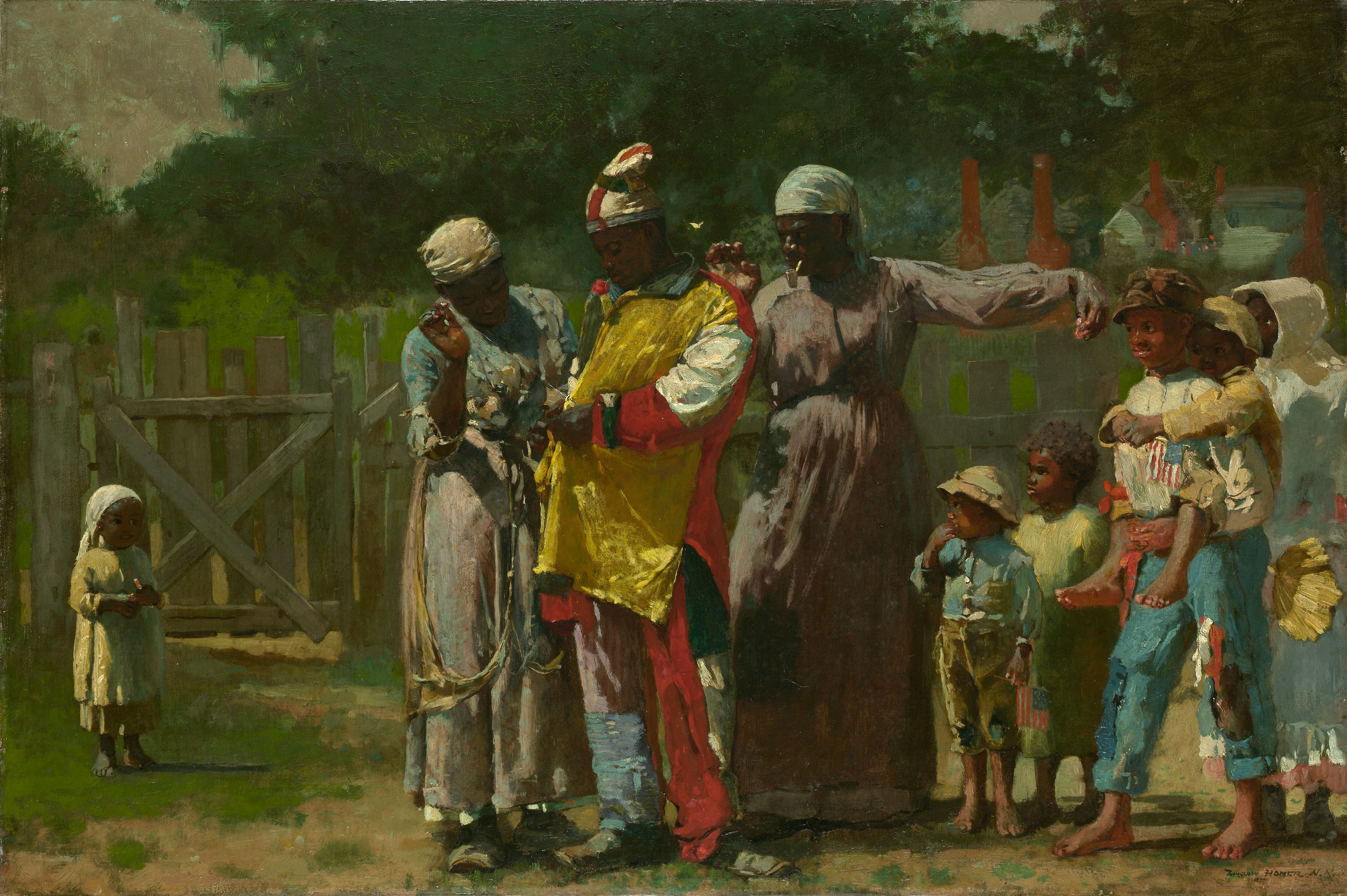
Dressing for the Carnival, 1877 by Winslow Homer

Pinkster is a spring festival, taking place in late May or early June. The name is a variation of the Dutch word Pinksteren, meaning "Pentecost". Pinkster in English refers to the festivals held by the Black population of New York and New Jersey, particularly in the early 19th century. To the Dutch, Pinkster was a religious holiday, a chance to rest, gather and celebrate Christian sacraments like baptisms and confirmations. It also had a long tradition as a day of dance and merriment. For enslaved people, Pinkster was a time free from work and a chance to gather and catch up with family and friends.

Pentecost is a Christian feast falling on the seventh Sunday after Easter, in remembrance of the descent of the Holy Spirit, in the guise of flames, upon the apostles at the "Feast of the Harvest" (Ex. 23:16), also known as Whitsunday, enabling the apostles to spread the news of Christ in all languages, (glossolalia or the "gift of tongues") (Acts 2).

Pinksteren was also a celebration of the change of the seasons and of spring renewal. Various customs are intended to invoke the growth and fertility of fields and pastures. These include, for example, setting up Pentecost trees (pinksterkroon), that have the same origin as the maypoles. In many places inhabitants decorate village fountains with flowers and birch branches to which they attach colorful ribbons and chains of colored eggs.

== In North America ==
New Netherland flag

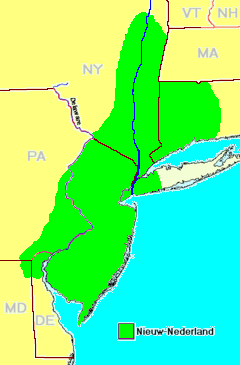
The New Netherland colony in North America

Pinkster is a holiday that originated in the Netherlands and was brought to America by Dutch settlers in the 17th century. It derives from the Christian feast of Pentecost, which commemorates the descent of the Holy Spirit upon the apostles, occurring seven weeks after Easter. However, in the U.S., Pinkster evolved into a unique celebration, particularly among African American communities in the 18th and early 19th centuries. In New York, families traveled from the outlying areas into New York City or Albany, which remained a largely Dutch city into the early 19th century. There they could meet up with the significantly larger population of enslaved people and Black Dutch freemen. By the mid-18th century, celebrations in New York and Brooklyn attracted very large gatherings. Black Dutch sold berries, herbs, Sassafras bark, beverages, and oysters, and they used the money they earned at the Pinkster festival. Today the Pinkster festival in Albany, New York, remains to be the oldest African American music festival in the United States.

The African American Pinkster Committee of New York (AAPCNY) along with the African Burial Ground National Monument hold an annual Pinkster celebration in New York City.

=== Impact on African-Americans ===
Pinkster as an African-American celebration reached its height in New York between 1790 and 1810. Before the holiday, temporary shelters were built, frequently based on styles imitating African shelters. The festival could continue for three to four days, including sports, dance, and music. The highlight was the Toto or the Guinea dance, performed to the beating of drums.

==== Race-based legislation ====
Sometime between 1811 and 1813 despite or perhaps because of its popularity, the city of Albany, New York passed a city ordinance banning the drinking and dancing associated with Pinkster. Whites were concerned that the congregation and socialization of large groups of African Americans could provide them with the opportunity to plot or plan revolution. According to historian A.J. William-Myers, the council may have sought to eliminate the Pinksterfest because Albany leaders were concerned about a Louisiana slave rebellion that took place in April of 1811. The law was symbolically repealed by the Albany Common Council in 2011.

Albert James Williams Myers, professor of Black Studies at the State University of New York at New Paltz remarks, "I think that political officials in Albany and elsewhere within New York felt that since Pinkster was a gathering for Africans that perhaps it could lead to a revolt and so I think it was really fear of the possibility that something like this could happen that we have to bring it to an end. So for all intents and purposes, Pinkster is a memory, at least the way it was celebrated along the Hudson before 1811."

== Pinkster in Europe ==
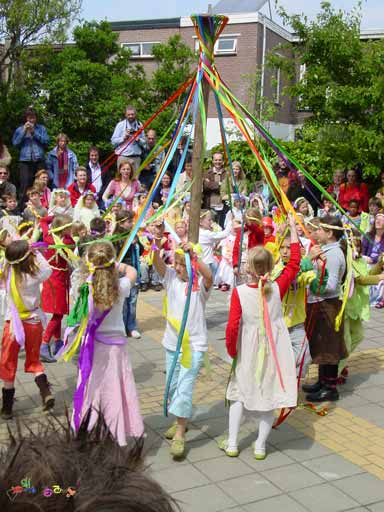
A pinksterkroon in the Netherlands

Pinkster was celebrated over several days. The Dutch observed Pinkster by attending church services and holding important church functions such as baptisms and confirmations. Neighbors, freed from work, visited with one another while the children painted eggs in vibrant colours and indulged in sweets like gingerbread.

Africans and Dutch also enjoyed drinking, games, dance and music during the Pinkster holidays. Sellers decorated their stalls and carts with greenery and flowers, especially azaleas, which were associated with Pentecost, and sellers would hire skillful African dancers to attract attention to their stalls. Their dances were combinations of African and European steps and elements, creating new dances that were precursors to modern tap and break dancing.

To different people, Pinkster signified different things. Pinkster was a religious holiday, a day off from work, and a day for socializing for Dutch people. The celebration was all of these things and more for slaves who gathered in rural areas or at urban markets. Men and women in Africa earned money, experienced a brief period of independence, and made purchases. More significantly, Pinkster meant the possibility to reconcile with family and friends as well as the chance to maintain, alter, and express African customs despite the limitations imposed by slavery.

John Williams, a formerly enslaved man from Albany, argued in the late nineteenth century that "'Pinkster Day' was in Africa a religious day, partly pagan and partly Christian like our Christmas day. Many of the old Colored people, then in Albany, were born in Africa and would dance their wild dances and sing in their native language." In Albany, "'Pinkster' festivities took place usually in May, and lasted an entire week. It was...the Carnival of the African Race, in which they indulged in unrestrained merriment and revelry." "The dancing music was peculiar. The main instrument was a sort of 'kettle-drum,' a wooden article called an eel-pot, with a sheepskin drawn tightly over one end."

Pinskter reached its pinnacle as an African-American holiday in Albany between 1790 and 1810; the holiday was set up on three sides of a square on the top of Pinkster Hill. During this period King Charles directed the Pinkster festival. King Charles was a local celebrity amongst African Americans in Albany, they praised the renowned figure. His title of Master of Ceremonies, gave him the responsibility of keeping the spirits of the participants during the live drumming and dancing performances that commemorated during the celebration. Although Pinskter caught the attention of other ethnicities by the early 1800s it was viewed as an Afro-centric holiday.

=== Pinkster King ===
During the late 18th and early 19th centuries, the festival was presided over by a "King", who was himself enslaved. The crowning of the Pinkster King recalled elections of leaders in some African cultures of Northeastern North America, investing respected members of the slave community with symbolic power over the whole community and honor within the slave community. This kind of celebration, inverting rank, recalls African and European traditions like Boxing Day and Mardi Gras. This tradition may have its roots in the Pentecost celebrations in the Kingdom of Kongo under the reign of Afonso I of Kongo.

One well-known "king" in Albany was "Charley of Pinkster Hill", the "King of the Blacks." Charley was born in Angola, said to be of royal blood, and became the servant of Volkert P. Douw, a wealthy merchant. "King Charles" dressed in the costume of a British Brigadier, a long scarlet coat with gold lace and yellow buckskin accessories, and a three-cornered hat. Charley and his followers, decorated with "pinkster blummies" (azaleas), led a parade up Albany's State Street. Following the parade "the negroes made merry with games and feasting, all paying homage to the king, who was held in awe and reverence as an African prince. In the evening there was a grand dance, led by Charles and some sable beauty."

== In modern times ==
Since the 1970s, efforts have been made to resurrect Pinkster in New York, such as at Philipsburg Manor House, an 18th-century living history museum located in Sleepy Hollow, New York, once the central location for milling and mercantile operations in the Hudson Valley. Every spring, Philipsburg Manor recreates an authentic celebration of Pinkster in North America, combining both Dutch and African traditions. In Albany, New York Pinksterfest has been incorporated into the city's annual Tulip Festival, celebrated on Mother's Day.

The Djembes and Dance includes a recreation of a colonial Pinkster festival. The event is attended by individuals of all ages and is often enjoyable for participants while also being educational. The occasion recognizes both slavery's tyranny in New York and its final defeat. With more than a century's worth of Hudson Valley Pinkster celebrations combined, it is the only Pinkster recreation in North America. Children's games like ninepins and stilts, holiday-specific baked products, egg-dyeing, and European-style country dance all derive from Dutch culture. A parade, storytelling, drumming, dance, and the selection of a Pinkster King all stem from African custom. The Philipses, affluent Dutch merchants, held the Upper Mills property at Philipsburg Manor, which at the time covered more than 50,000 acres. There year-round dwelt a community of 23 enslaved Africans who ran a grist mill and a sizable farm. The Philipses leased out manor property to European tenants, many of whom were Dutch, who planted wheat as a cash crop. It's unknown if the African and Dutch inhabitants of the manor attended one of the larger neighboring metropolitan festivals or hosted their own Pinkster celebrations in Philipsburg throughout the 1700s.

Pinkster is still recognized as an official holiday in The Netherlands, though many of the early types of celebrations are no longer in fashion, rendering the long weekend more just a basic holiday for all. The Dutch music festival Pinkpop was originally held on Pentecost weekend and takes the first part of its name from Pinkster.

An early scene in Kaitlyn Greenidge's historical novel Libertie (Algonquin Books, 2021) is set during a Pinkster celebration in New York.

== See also ==
- Historic Hudson Valley
- Juneteenth
- Kwanzaa
