= Hillgreen, Lane & Company =

Pipe organ (instrument) manufacturing company, 1898-1972

Hillgreen, Lane & Co. was a builder of church and theatre pipe organs. The company was founded in 1898 by Alfred Hillgreen and Charles Alva Lane in Alliance, Ohio. The factory was located at Market and Mechanic Streets, very close to the shops of the pipe maker A.R. Schopp's Sons, often doing business with them. Hillgreen, Lane & Co. ceased operations in 1972.
