= First Lutheran Church (Canton, Ohio) =

- Location: 909 Tuscarawas Street East, Canton, Ohio
- Country: United States
- Denomination: Lutheran Church
- Churchmanship: Evangelical

History
- Status: Church

Architecture
- Functional status: Active
- Architectural type: Gothic Revival

Clergy
- Pastor: Rev Dr Darla Ann Kratzer
- First Lutheran Church
- U.S. National Register of Historic Places
- Part of: Downtown Canton Historic District
- NRHP reference No.: 82003647
- Added to NRHP: 9/28/1982

First Lutheran Church is a historic church at 909 Tuscarawas Street East, Canton, Ohio that is listed on the National Register of Historic Places.

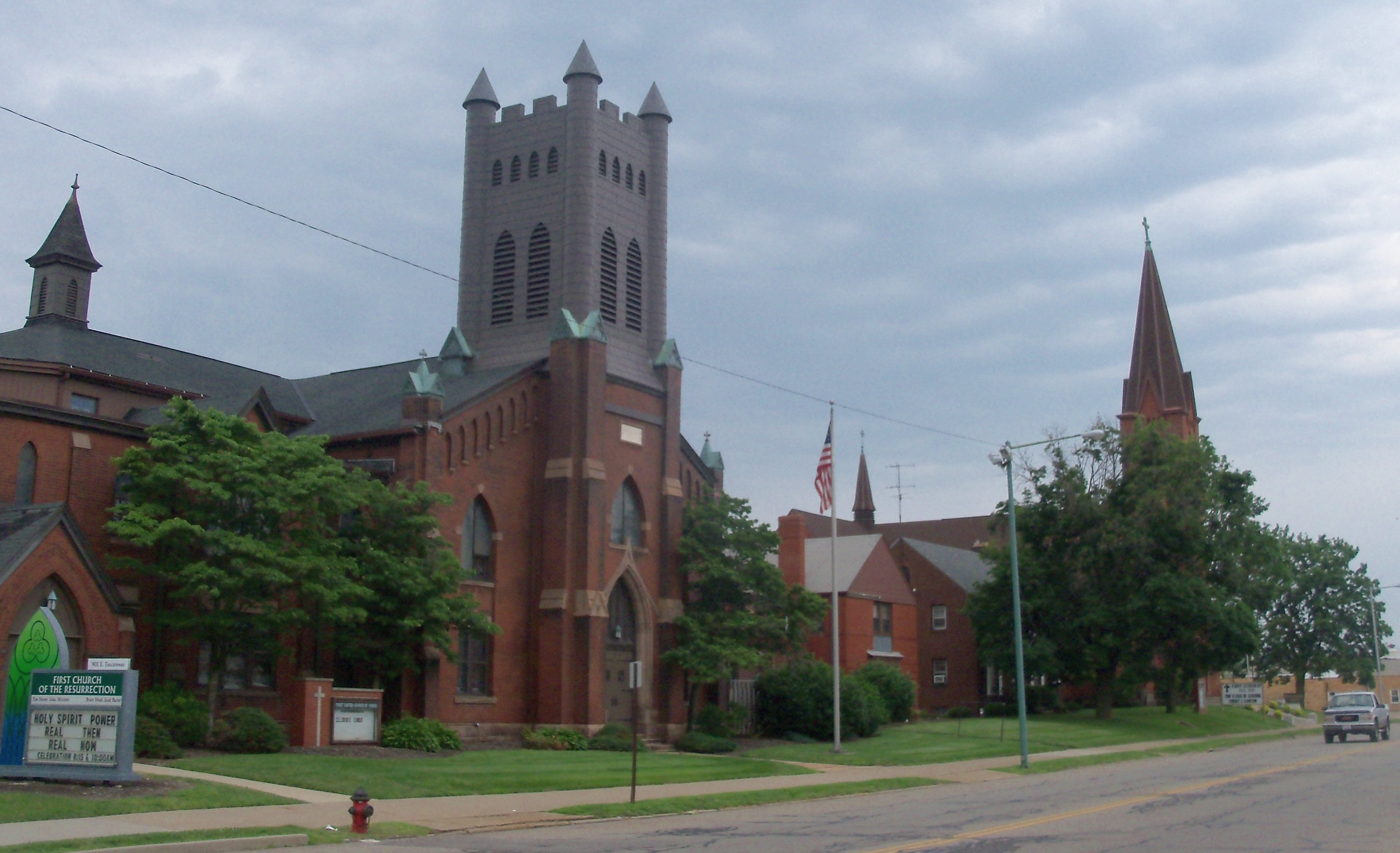
First Reformed Church,(now First Church of the Resurrection), 901 E. Tuscarawas St., Canton Ohio on left and First Lutheran Church, 909 E. Tuscarawas St., Canton Ohio on right, behind tree.
