= First Lutheran Church (Middleton, Wisconsin) =

Historic church in Wisconsin, United States

- U.S. National Register of Historic Places
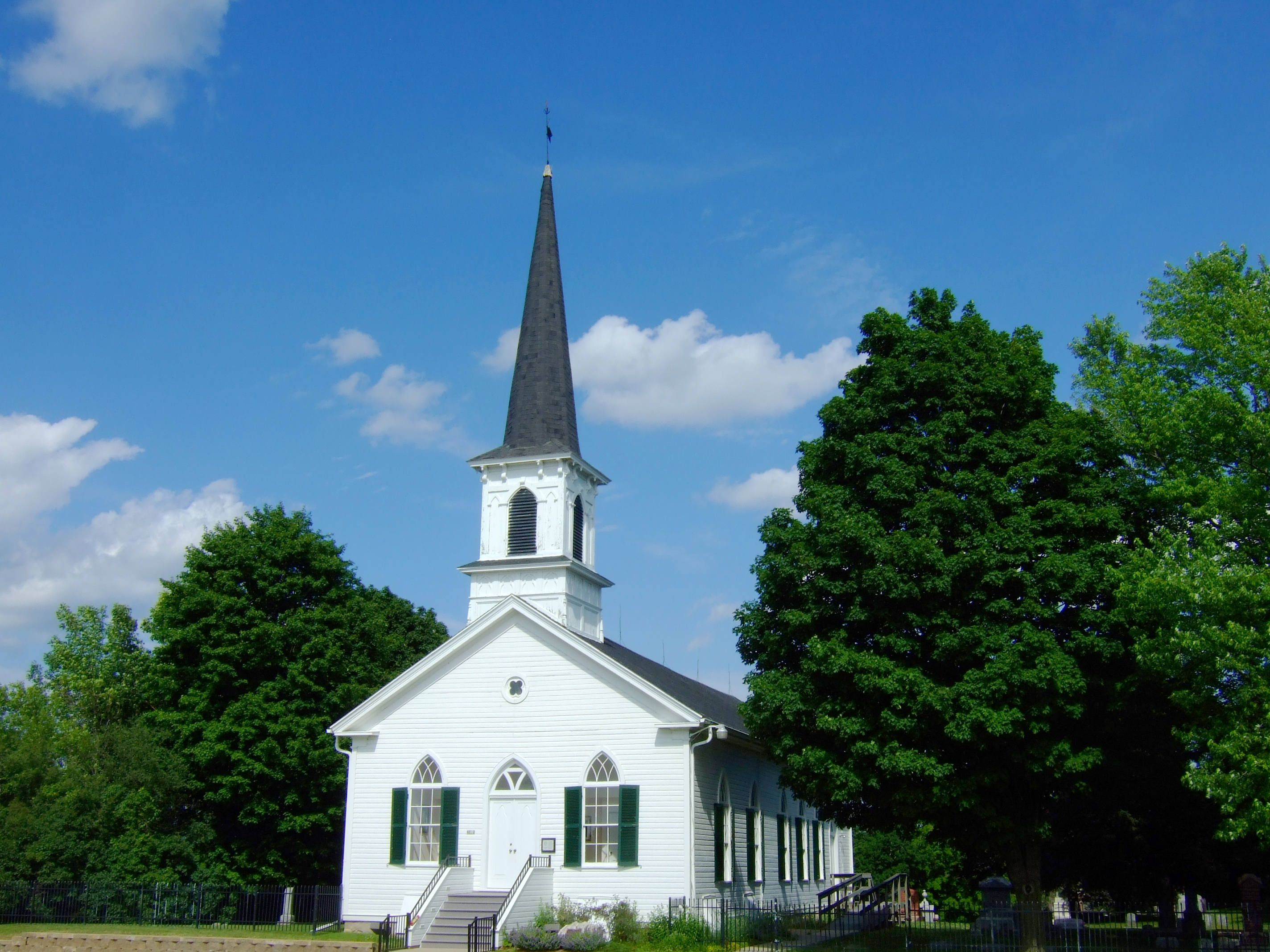
- First Lutheran Church
- Location: Middleton, Wisconsin
- Coordinates: 43.07523°N 89.5367°W
- Built: 1866
- Architectural style: Gothic Revival
- NRHP reference No.: 88000728
- Added to NRHP: June 16, 1988

First Lutheran Church is located in Middleton, Wisconsin, at the corner of Old Sauk Road and Pleasant View Road. The congregation of First Lutheran Church was established in 1852 and this sanctuary was built in 1866 by German immigrants. It has not had an active congregation since 1947. It was added to the National Register of Historic Places in 1988.

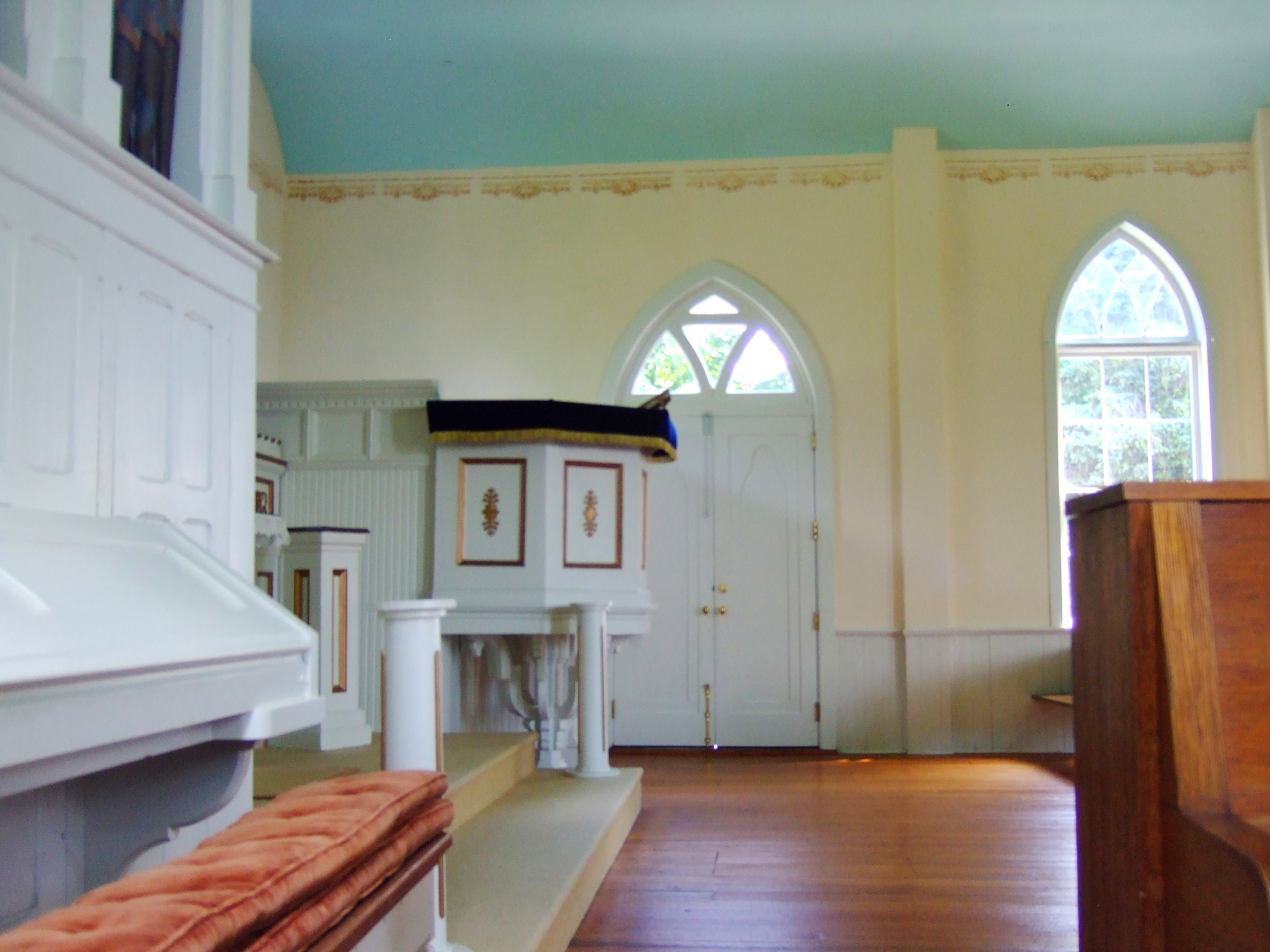
Organ and pulpit

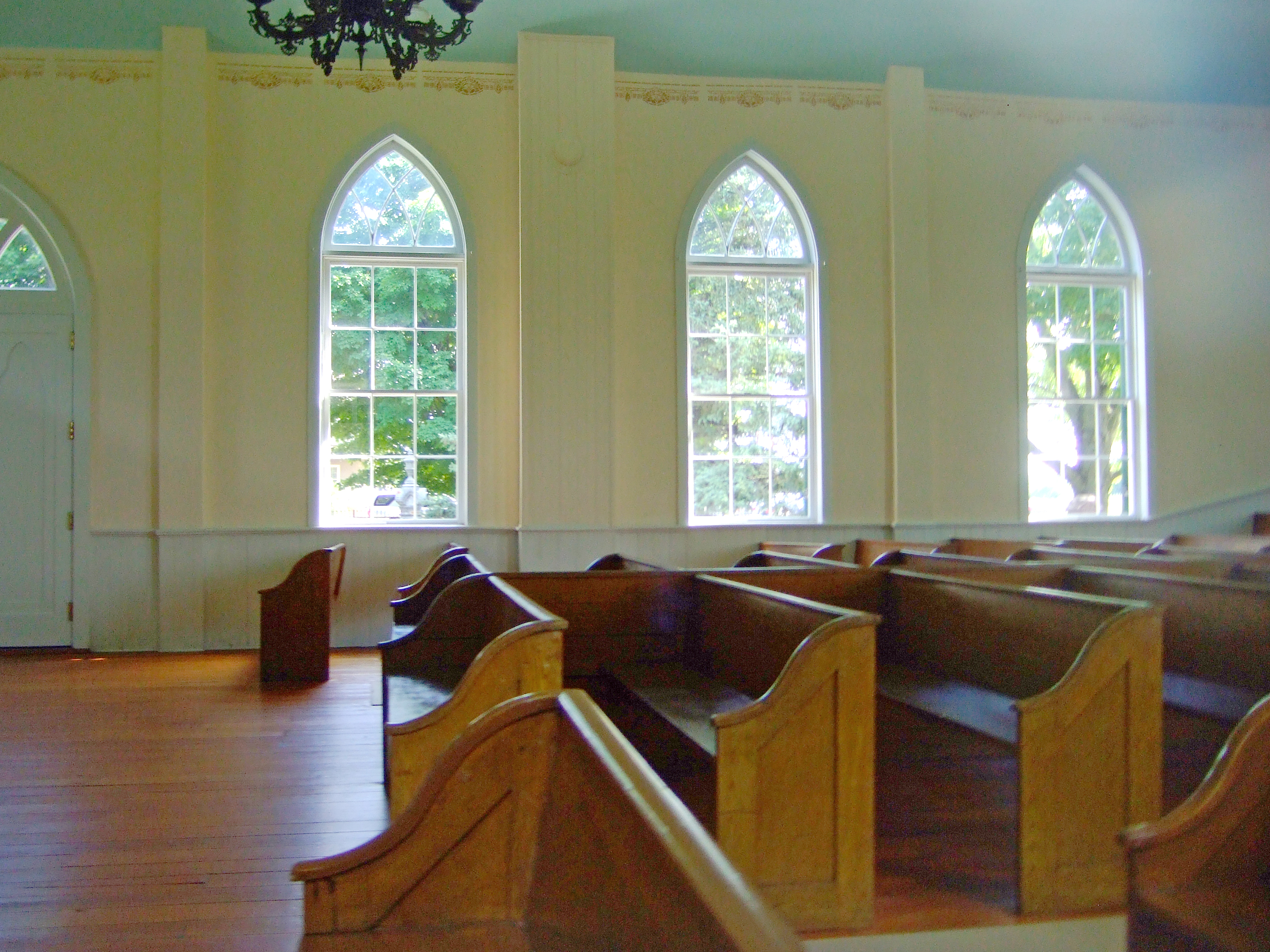
Pews and windows
