= Hendrickson Organ Company =

Pipe organ manufacturer based in Minnesota, USA

Hendrickson Opus 92 at Wayzata Community Church in Wayzata, Minnesota.

Hendrickson Organ Company is a manufacturer of pipe organs based in St. Peter, Minnesota.

== History ==
The company's founder, Charles George Hendrickson, was born on 10 June 1935 in Willmar, Minnesota. He studied physics, which he then taught at various US colleges. He started working part-time on pipe organs as a graduate student, and began the company in December 1964 while teaching at Minnesota State University.

Since then, over 100 pipe organ projects have been completed. Along with new pipe organs, the firm has restored old instruments, relocated instruments, and rebuilt and enlarged existing pipe organs. The firm also provides service work and tuning for approximately fifty organs.

In 1999, the company had 7 employees and earned "mid-$300K" in sales.

Charles Hendrickson died on 17 December 2020 and was succeeded by his son Andreas Hendrickson as president.

== Notable instruments ==
- Luther College, Decorah, Iowa (2 manuals, 36 ranks, Opus 10, 1971)
- First Lutheran Church, St. Peter, Minnesota (3 manuals [one is a coupling manual], 44 ranks, Opus 45, 1978)
- St. Wenceslaus Catholic Church, New Prague, Minnesota (43 ranks, 3 manuals, 30 stops, 2,152 pipes, Opus 47, 1979)
- Cathedral of Saint Joseph, Sioux Falls, South Dakota (3 manuals, 62 ranks, Opus 78, 1991), replaced in 2025 by an instrument built by Juget-Sinclair Organbuilders
- Wayzata Community Church, Wayzata, Minnesota (4 manuals, 70 ranks, Opus 92, 1998)
- Church of St. Peter, St. Peter, Minnesota (3 manuals, 40 ranks, 1,981 pipes, Opus 99, 2001). Opus 99 includes pipes from the church's former instrument, Hendrickson Opus 53, which was severely damaged in the 1998 1998 Comfrey – St. Peter tornado outbreak.
- Christ Chapel, Gustavus Adolphus College, St. Peter, Minnesota. (Builder: Hillgreen-Lane, 1962. Modifications & damage restoration from the 1998 St. Peter tornado outbreak: Charles Hendrickson, 1999) (Manuals: 4, Ranks: 54)
