= Irish American Heritage Museum =

Coordinates: 42.647163°N 73.750636°W

The Irish American Heritage Museum is a museum in Albany, New York. The museum describes their educational mission as "To preserve and tell the story of the contributions of the Irish people and their culture in America, inspiring individuals to examine the importance of their own heritage as part of the American cultural mosaic."

== History ==
The museum was organized in 1986 by the New York State American-Irish Legislators Society and was initially financed by the State Natural Heritage Trust, the State Council on the Arts, and numerous private donations.

The first physical location opened on June 16, 1990, on the grounds of the Michael J. Quill Irish Cultural and Sports Centre in East Durham, New York.

In 1992, the museum was permanently chartered by the Board of Regents of the State of New York as a 501(c)(3) non-profit organization.

In an effort to increase visitor traffic, the museum was relocated to downtown Albany in 2012. The 3,250 square foot space opened on January 17, 2012, and includes the Paul O'Dwyer Library and the Ancient Order of Hibernians' archives.

== Exhibits ==
Exhibits at the museum have included: "Irish in the Civil War", which looked at Irish-Americans in the American Civil War; "The Irish and the Erie Canal", which highlighted the contributions of the Irish in all phases of the Erie Canal construction; and "Dublin: Then and Now", which included photographs of the streets of Dublin in the late 1950s and early 1960s.

== Visiting the Museum ==
The museum is currently a member of The North American Reciprocal Museum (NARM) Association.

The Irish American Heritage Museum is located at 21 Quackenbush Square in downtown Albany. Parking is available on the street and in parking lots behind the museum. The museum is open Wednesday, Thursday and Friday from 11 am to 4 pm, Saturday and Sunday from 12 noon to 4 pm, and closed on Monday and Tuesday.
