= Albany Center Gallery =

ART GALLERY NEW YORK

Coordinates: 42°39′9″N 73°44′59″W

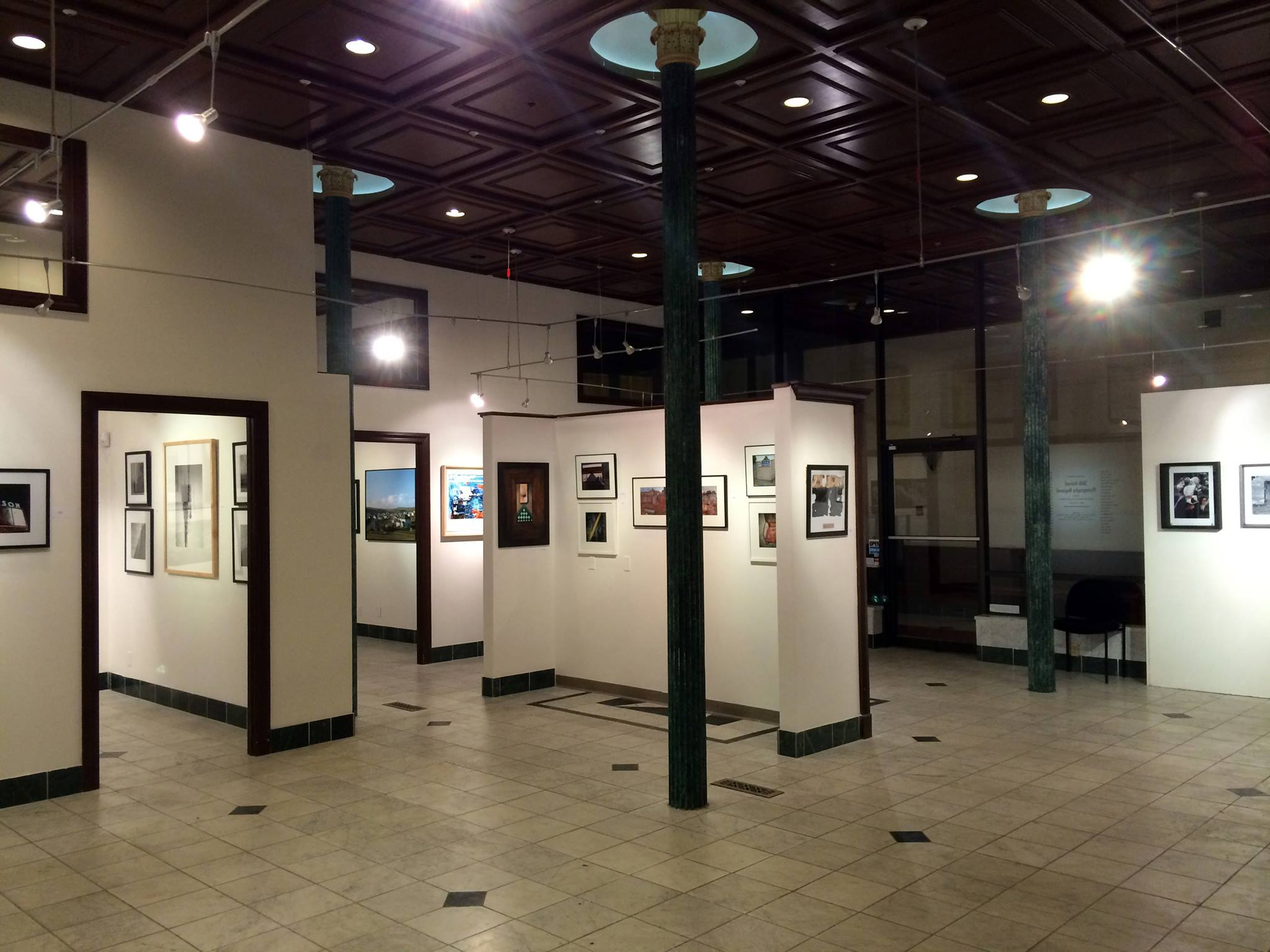
- Inside Albany Center Gallery
- Established: 1977
- Location: 48 North Pearl Street, Albany, New York
- Director: Tony Iadicicco
- Website: http://albanycentergallery.org

Albany Center Gallery (ACG) is a nonprofit art space located in downtown Albany, New York. Supported by state, corporate and foundation funds, as well as individual donations and memberships, ACG is dedicated to the exhibition of regional artists within a 100-mile radius of Albany, and building a strong, knowledgeable audience for the visual arts. Serving the art community and the general public, all of Albany Center Gallery's exhibitions, receptions, and artist interviews are free and open to the public. The gallery presents at least seven major exhibitions a year in the main gallery, including the Mohawk Hudson Regional Invitational, an annual exhibition featuring selected artists from the previous year's Artists of the Mohawk-Hudson Region exhibit.

== History ==
Founded in 1977 by Leslie Urbach, Albany Center Gallery has exhibited thousands of the area's finest contemporary artists working in the following media: painting, drawing, sculpture, photography, printmaking, fiber arts, digital art, video, mixed media, artist books, and installation. Albany Center Gallery is dedicated to the exhibition of regional artists within a 100-mile radius of Albany. Albany Center Gallery's exhibition program serves the art community and the general public. Exhibitions, murals, consulting, art & space rentals, pop-up shows, youth programs, artist talks, community events & more are all activities offered. Notable exhibitors over the years include Leigh Wen, Scott Nelson Foster, T.E. Breitenbach, Jenny Kemp, Ed Cowley, Thom O’Connor, Richard Garrison, Scott Brodie, Betty Warren, Willie Marlowe, William Jaeger, and Erik Laffer.

The Capital Region's Times Union named Albany Center Gallery the best art gallery of 2012, also receiving the same honor in the 2015 Metroland Readers Poll. In 2023, Albany Center Gallery's Can't Stop, Won't Stop: Celebrating 50 Years of Hip Hop exhibition was featured in Rolling Stone magazine as a "notable celebration" for the anniversary

== See also ==
- Culture in New York's Capital District
- List of museums in New York
- Albany's Culture
