= First Lutheran Church (Springfield, Ohio) =

Church in Springfield, Ohio, U.S.

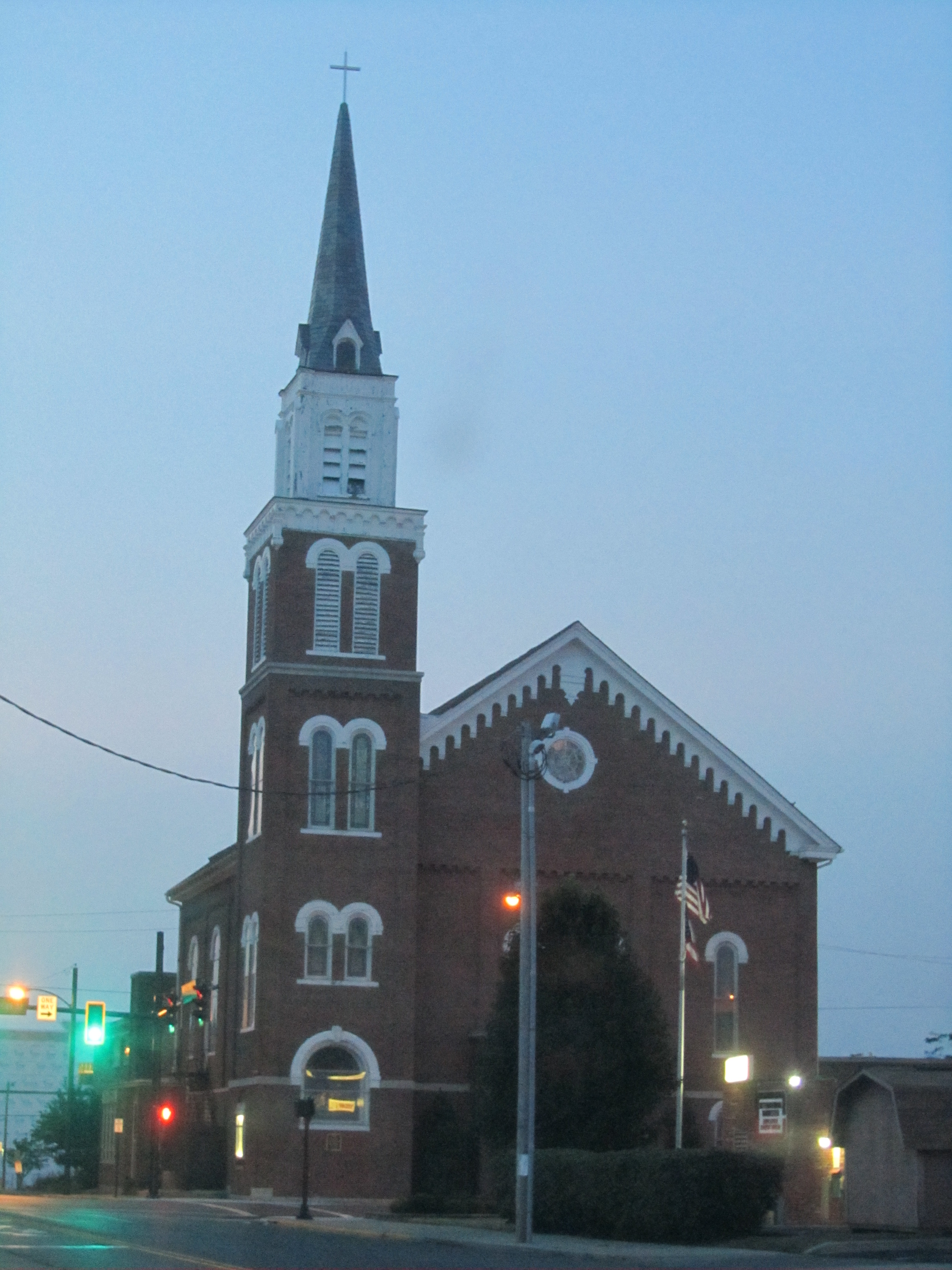
- First Lutheran Church (Springfield, Ohio)

Religion
- Affiliation: Evangelical Lutheran Church in America

Location
- Location: West High St. & Wittenberg Ave.
- Municipality: Springfield
- State: Ohio
- Interactive map of First Lutheran Church

Website
- www.firstlutheranspringfield.org

First Lutheran Church is a Lutheran church in Springfield, Ohio, and is in the Southern Ohio Synod of the Evangelical Lutheran Church in America (ELCA).

== Early history ==
First Evangelical Lutheran Church, located on the northeast corner of West High Street and Wittenberg Avenue, is the oldest congregation of Lutherans in Springfield, Ohio. in 1841, Reverend John Lehman, a missionary from Pennsylvania, gathered the scattered Lutherans in the area to form a congregation. When Rev. Ezra Keller came to establish Wittenberg College, he became the pastor and formally organized the congregation. Keller was influenced by Americanists among Lutherans who sought to adapt the German church to the United States and to Americanize the German immigrants. They supported reform efforts such as anti-slavery, temperance, world peace, the Sunday school, and social services.

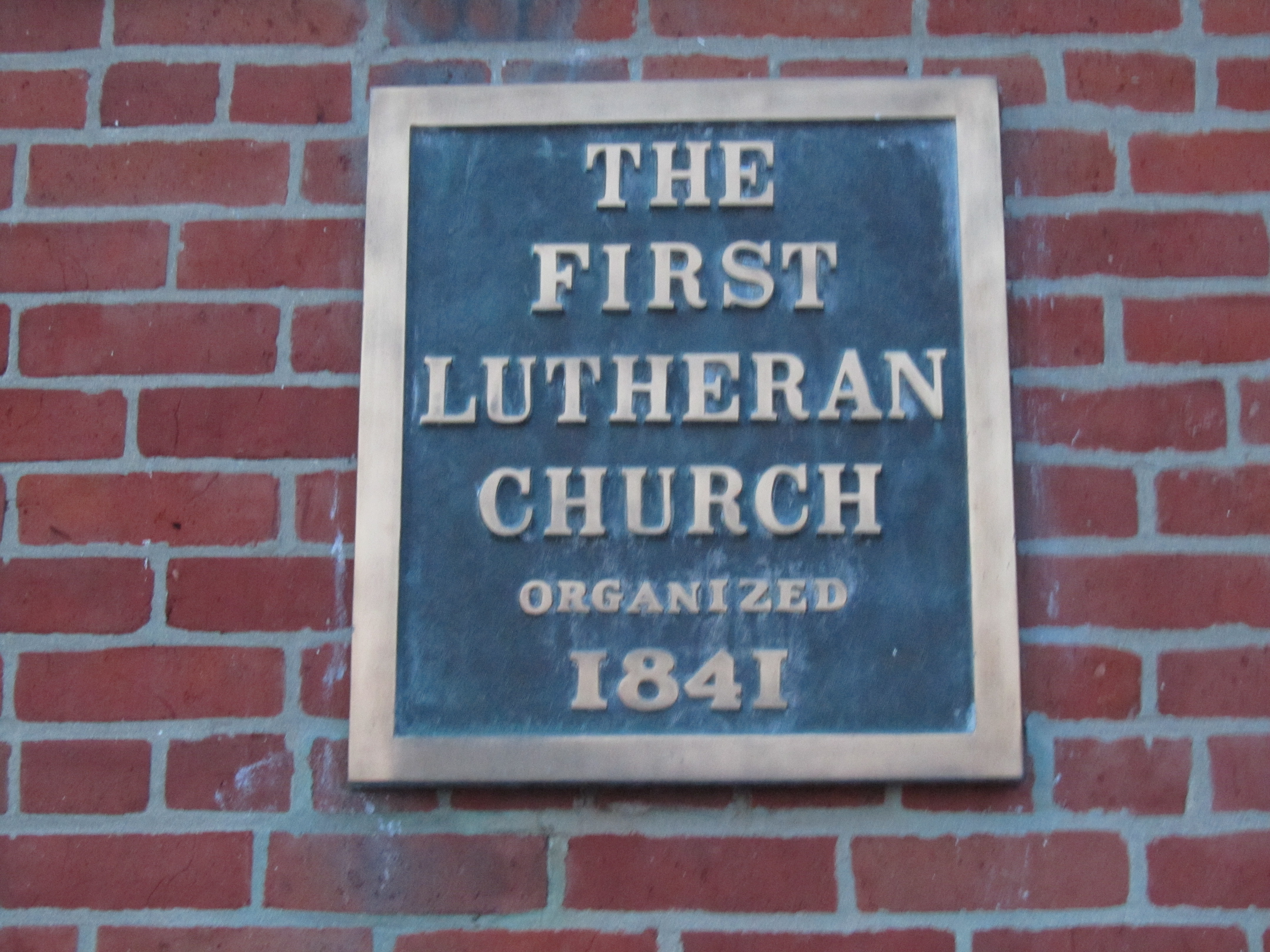
FLC Organized in 1841

== Relationship with Wittenberg University ==
Wittenberg University began at First Lutheran and all the preparatory, college, and seminary classes were held there from 1845 to 1851. The congregation served as the college's church. Presidents Keller, Sprecher, Helwig, and Ort were members and pastors. Nearly the entire early faculty were members and many current Wittenberg University faculty, staff, administrators, and students are members. Reverend Michael W. Hamma, after whom Hamma School of Theology was named, (now part of the Trinity Lutheran Seminary in Columbus) was once the pastor. Many seminarians have served as assistant pastors, youth leaders, and church musicians. The college paid pew rent to the church for many students who were members. Many, upon graduation, moved west to establish congregations in Ohio, Indiana, Illinois, Michigan, Kentucky, Tennessee, West Virginia, Iowa, and Kansas, and to California and other western states. The present building, built in 1869, encompasses parts of the north and west walls of the original building. The ground floor assembly room is called Wittenberg Hall to commemorate the school's beginning in that space.

== Lutheran presence in Springfield ==
In the 1880s, as the town grew, colonies of members from the church left to start new congregations in town. The English Evangelical Lutheran Church became First Lutheran when a group established the Second Lutheran Church at Selma Road and Clifton Avenue. The process was called "swarming". Subsequently, other members "swarmed" to establish Third, Fourth, Fifth, and Calvary. First also provided leadership and assistance in the establishment of Trinity, St. Mark, Grace, and Auburn congregations. It operated Sunday schools and missions in the east, west, and south ends of town which developed into congregations of other Christian denominations. This growth occurred as Springfield grew to 80,000 people and became a major industrial city. Thus, First was the "mother" church for Lutheran growth in the American west and in Springfield as well.

== Renovations and updates ==
As Springfield's population peaked and people moved to the suburbs and industry declined; downtown businesses moved to the malls. The congregation remained where it was and in 1955 constructed a three-story, modern Christian education facility. In 1961 and again in 2005 the sanctuary was renovated. The entire facility, with the exception of the balcony, is now handicap accessible.

The center city is now involved in a major makeover and First Lutheran Church is in the thick of construction. The Springfield Regional Medical Center will make the center city a hub for patients, their families, and medical professionals. First Lutheran Church will begin a special ministry to many of these individuals. It already maintains a support program for patients at the Springfield Cancer Center.
