= Tulip Festival (Albany, New York) =

Coordinates: 42.6569°N 73.7707°W

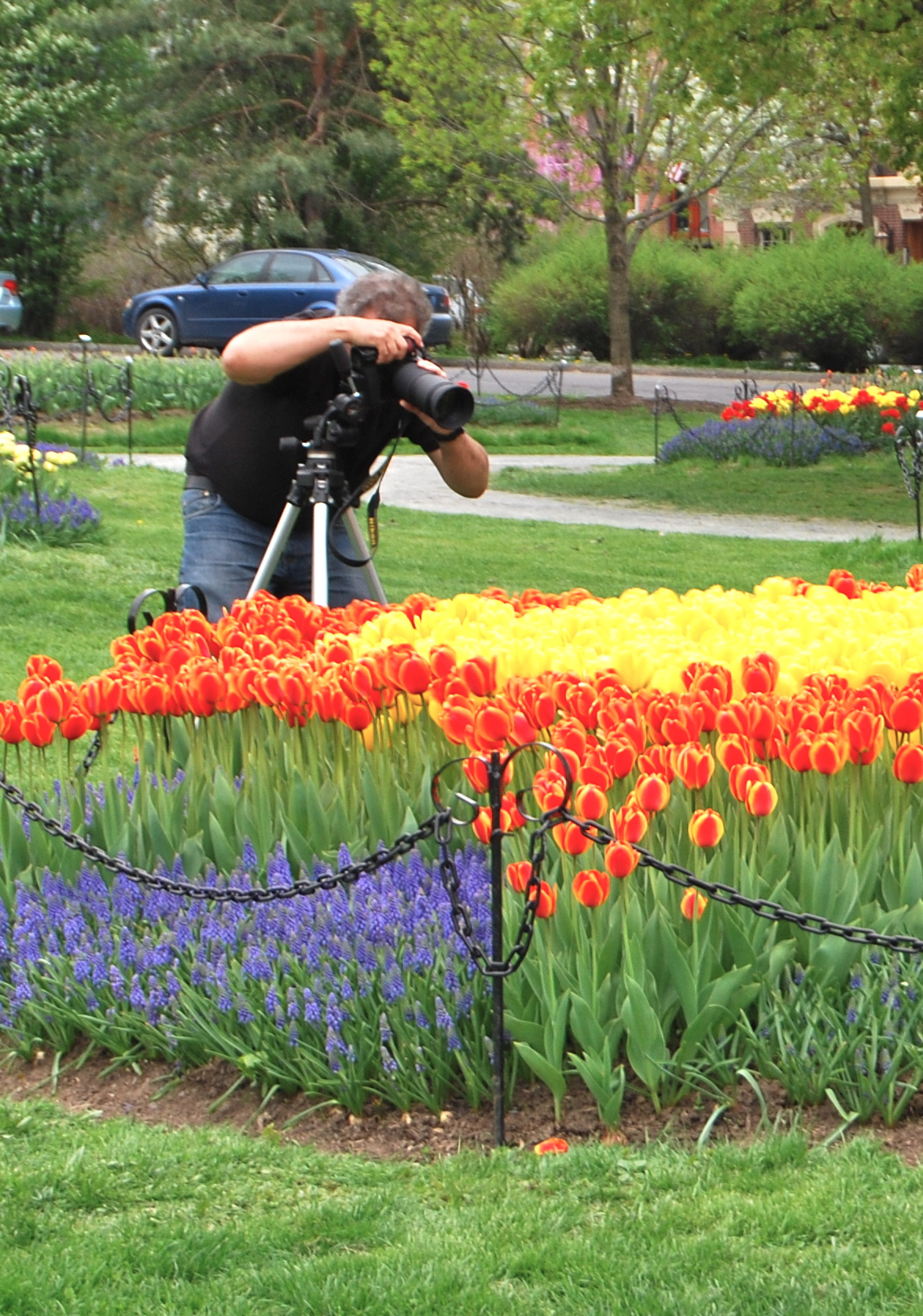
A photographer taking in the floral scene at the Tulip Fest, 2009

The Tulip Festival is held in Albany, New York every spring at Washington Park. Each year, the event lasts for a weekend and coincides with Mother's Day.

== History ==
The festival originated as a result of Albany becoming sister-cities with Nijmegen in the Netherlands following World War II. In gratitude, Queen Wilhelmina of the Netherlands sent 2,000 flower bulbs to Albany. On July 1, 1948, Albany's Mayor Erastus Corning 2nd got a city ordinance passed declaring the tulip as the city's official flower. In addition, he sent a request to Queen Wilhelmina to name a varietyof the flower as Albany's tulip. On July 11, 1948, her reply was "Her Majesty gladly accepts the invitation to designate a tulip as the official flower of Albany." She picked the variety "Orange Wonder", a slow-growing and relatively rare 18-inch tall tulip that is orange-shaded with a scarlet toward the center.

The first Tulip Festival was celebrated the following year on May 14, 1949, with opening ceremonies still carried on today as tradition, such as the sweeping of State Street and the crowning of the Tulip Queen.

== Events and ceremonies ==
The festival commences with the ceremonial scrubbing of State Street by students in traditional Dutch dress.

Each year, the Tulip Queen is crowned as part of the event. The Tulip Queen acts as an ambassador for Albany for the following year.

Since 1998 the Tulip Festival has included an award for the Mother of the Year.

In 1997 to commemorate the 50th anniversary of the festival the state of New York designated Albany as the "I Love New York Spring Destination". Also for the 50th anniversary a descendant variety of the "Wonder Orange" tulip was found in the Netherlands, and the new variety was named "City of Albany". The African-American tradition of Pinksterfest, whose origins are traced back even further to Dutch festivities, was later incorporated into the Tulip Festival.

Due to the COVID-19 pandemic, in 2020 and 2021 the festival did not occur in its regular form and only virtual events were run. The festival returned to in-person activities in 2022.

== Photo gallery ==
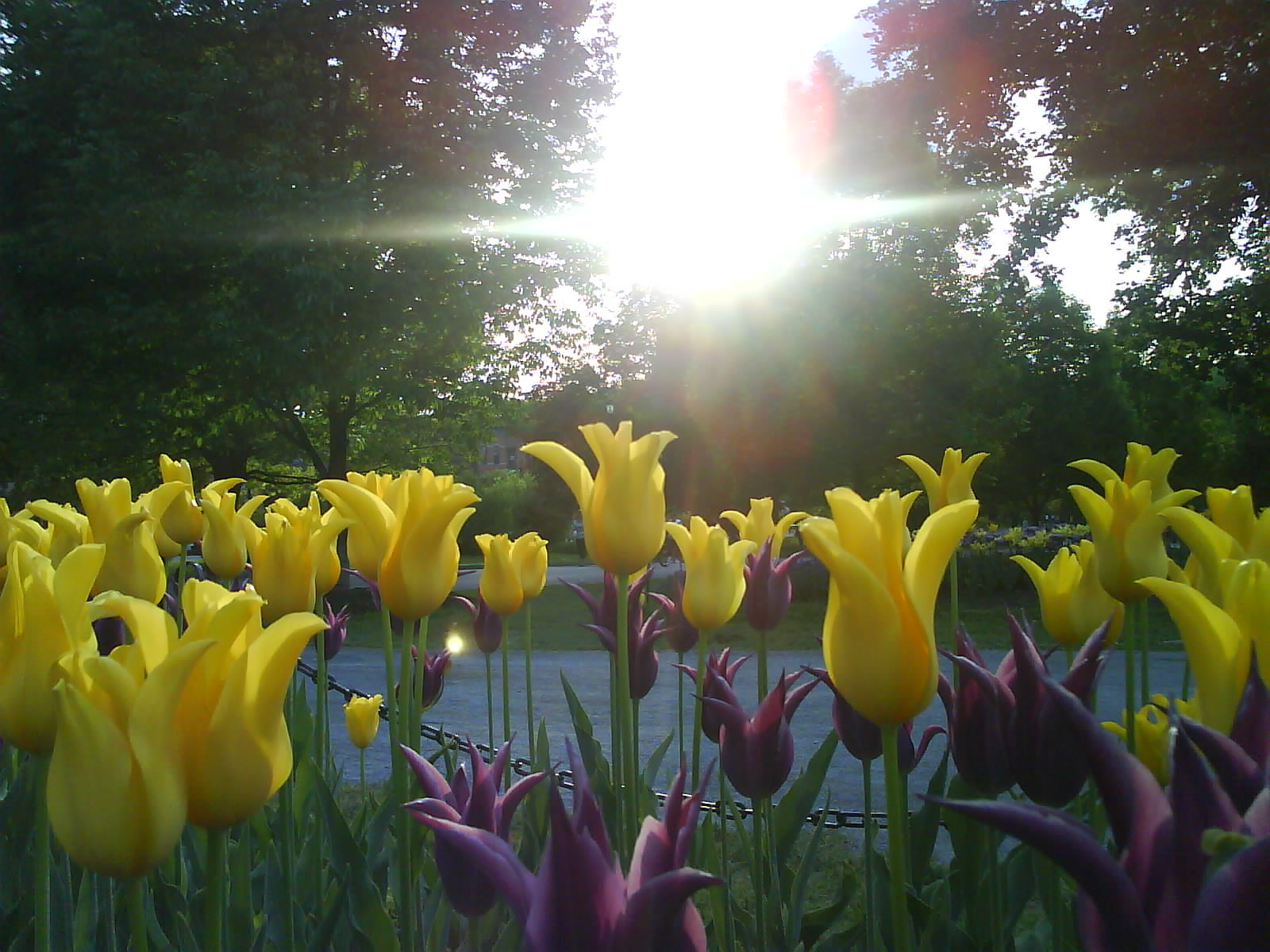
Tulips

== See also ==
- Tulip festival
