= First Evangelical Lutheran Church of Toronto =

Church in Toronto, Canada

Coordinates: 43.656934°N 79.378885°W

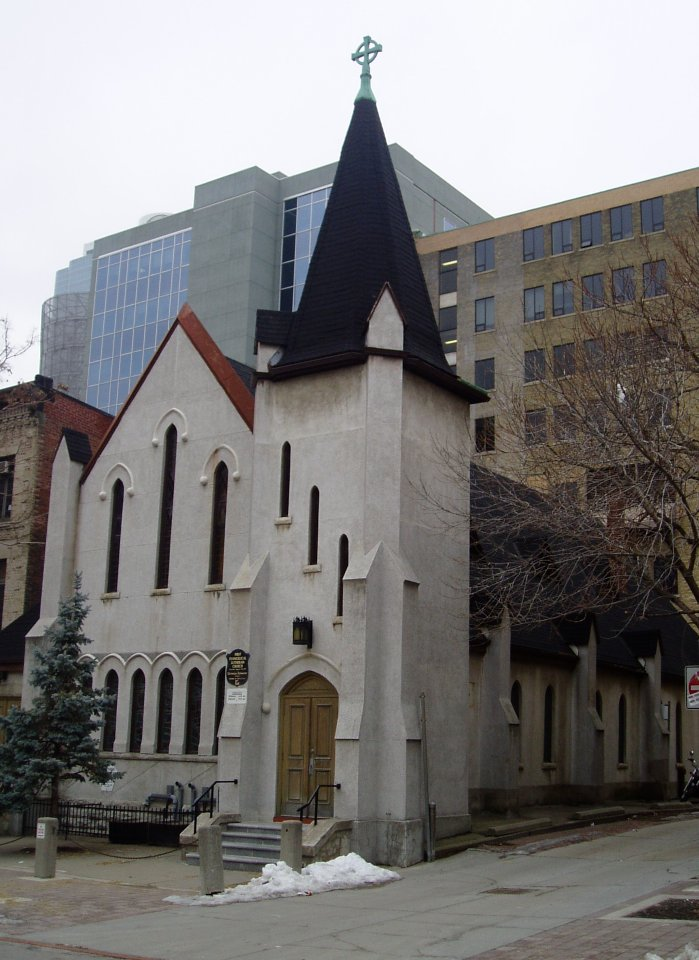
The First Evangelical Lutheran Church of Toronto

First Evangelical Lutheran Church is a congregation of the Eastern Synod of the Evangelical Lutheran Church in Canada, located at 116 Bond Street in Toronto, Ontario, Canada that serves the communities of Toronto, and the Greater Toronto Area. The church offers services in English with a sensitivity to its multicultural context and make-up. German language services were held for much of its history. The last German service was on March 1, 2020. The church was founded in 1851. A major celebration is planned to mark the congregation's 175th anniversary on August 9, 2026.

== History ==
The history of First Evangelical Lutheran Church of Toronto is, above all else an account of a relatively small number of German-speaking immigrants struggling to create and maintain a spiritual home for themselves and successive generations. Not only did those first immigrants accomplish this goal, but in so doing, earned for First Lutheran the designation of the Lutheran mother church of Toronto.

First Lutheran traces its beginnings to 1850 when a small number of German Lutheran families began to meet in their homes for worship. The German population of Toronto was then extremely small, no more than a few hundred, and probably equally represented by Protestants and Roman Catholics.

The formal organisation of the congregation took place on August 9, 1851, when 12 members signed its first constitution. Served by itinerant pastors for the first several years of its existence, the congregation met in a number of temporary locations which included the First Congregational Church, the Crookshank Street Public School and the Temperance Hall — all in the heart of what is now downtown Toronto. The first permanent pastor to serve the congregation, the Reverend Gustav Reiche, was appointed in 1855.

In that same year, the congregation purchased the property on Bond Street where it began construction of its first church building the following year. This was a small simple wood-frame structure and included a parsonage at its western end. The completed structure was consecrated on August 23, 1857.

In its first decade, the congregation was plagued by severe financial difficulties. Due to increases in building costs, the first of the European fundraising efforts took place in 1857 when a trustee of the congregation, G. van der Smissen, went to Germany and collected an amount sufficient to cover the most pressing building debts. As the financial situation had not improved by 1860, his daughter, Elizabeth van der Smissen, undertook a trip to Europe to raise funds. Using testimonials provided by clergy of other denominations in Toronto, specifically Anglican, Presbyterian, Methodist, Baptist, and Congregationalist, Miss van der Smissen traveled to Germany, France, Switzerland, England and Scotland, and raised sufficient funds to retire the congregation's debt. A record of these testimonials and of all funds collected remains in the congregation's archives to date.

The next few decades in the history of the congregation were characterized by a number of short-term tenancies of pastors, very slow growth in the size of congregation, and perennial difficulties in meeting ongoing financial obligations. Through the late 1920s, the women's group frequently provided funds to cover essential expenses when the financial situation of the congregation became desperate. In 1877, evening services in the English language were introduced for the benefit of the congregation's younger generation and their spouses who did not speak German.

In 1889 a fire seriously damaged the structure, but with the insurance compensation, the damage was repaired. Four years later the parsonage at the western end of the church was rebuilt into a Sunday school hall. By 1895, it was apparent that the original church building was deteriorating and no longer adequate for the congregation which had recently experienced significant growth.

An ambitious fundraising effort led by Theodore Heinzmann raised sufficient funds to construct the current more substantial sanctuary which was consecrated in 1898. Indications are that the early years of the twentieth-century were fairly successful for First Lutheran, as evidenced by the purchase of a parsonage on Carleton Street in 1902.

A rift developed in the congregation shortly thereafter which resulted in a number of members leaving to form St. Paul's English Lutheran Church. This breakaway congregation met for a time at the Broadway Tabernacle at College and Spadina before building its own small church on Glen Morris in 1914. The specific nature of the dissension is not documented in any existing congregational records.

Neither First Lutheran nor St. Paul's ultimately had the resources to remain viable individual congregations over time and by 1927, the membership of both had declined such that both congregations considered dissolution. Under the leadership of the Reverend Albert Grunwald, who was called in 1927, a period of renewal of First Lutheran began. A modestly-successful fundraising campaign began with the intention of selling the Bond Street structure and constructing a new sanctuary elsewhere in Toronto.

In 1930, the almost inevitable merger of First Lutheran and St. Paul's took place. The facility on Glen Morris was sold to a Russian-Greek Orthodox congregation with the proceeds designated for a new church elsewhere. In 1932, the congregation realized it could not sell the Bond Street church and decided to repair and improve the church using the monies accumulated in the building fund. The improvements included outfitting the chancel with the marble altar, altar rail, offering table, chancel paneling, hand-painted mural decoration, reredos, statue of Christ, pulpit and statue canopies. Most of these remain in place to date.

The congregation once again experienced renewal with the arrival of large numbers of immigrants after World War II. Not only did German-speaking immigrants find a spiritual home at First Lutheran, but it also provided a temporary home for Lutherans from a number of other countries, specifically the Finns, the Hungarians, the Latvians and the Lithuanians as they came together to establish their own congregations.

In the 1970s, First Lutheran began to recognize needs and opportunities beyond the immediate Lutheran community. For several years, it supported a number of foster children in Latin America. In past years it has supported urban initiatives such as Covenant House, Fellowship of the Least Coin, Shopping Bag Ladies House and Eva's Place. It has also provided support for a struggling Lutheran congregation in Latin America.

The character of the congregation has changed significantly over recent decades. The Sunday School, at one time about a hundred children, is no longer offered. A large seniors group was closely associated with the congregation for twenty years up to the COVID19 pandemic, when it also ceased to meet. However, both women's and men's groups continue to meet, and the congregation has hosted the Toronto Metropolitan University chapter of the Student Christian Movement of Canada since 2018.

On April 14, 2024 at the annual general meeting First Lutheran adopted a 2SLGBTQIA+ welcoming statement known as a Reconciling-in-Christ statement consistent with the mission of Reconciling Works.

In recent decades it also houses services for the small Hungarian Lutheran community of Toronto, one of only two Lutheran congregations remaining in North America (the other, more numerous community is located in Cleveland, Ohio). Services in Hungarian have not been held since the end of the COVID19 pandemic.

Since 2020 First Lutheran has hosted the InKlooSiv Voices Gospel Choir (the first and only LGBTQ2IA+ Gospel choir in the GTA) by providing rehearsal space at no charge.

A primary tenant of First Lutheran is Mint Music.

Downtown Hyderi Muslim Congregation has been holding Shia Jumma Salat Prayer at First Lutheran since 2020.

== Clergy ==
In January 2020, pastor Ralph Carl Wushke, previously ordained at the church but forced to leave as an openly gay man in the 1970s, was instated as church leader. Pastor Wushke retired on December 31, 2024.
