= First Lutheran Church (Albany, New York) =

Church building in Albany, NY

First Lutheran Church is a Lutheran congregation in Albany, New York. Founded in 1649 as Ebenezer Lutheran Church, First Lutheran is the oldest congregation of the Evangelical Lutheran Church in America, the only congregation in the ELCA to be founded while New York was under control of the Dutch, and the oldest Lutheran congregation in the United States. When the congregation was founded, it was a part of the Dutch settlement of New Netherland; it later adopted German and then English in 1808 for use during worship. The congregation began to use the name First Lutheran Church in 1871.

The congregation has worshipped in five different buildings; the current building has been in use since 1929. In 1926, another Lutheran congregation, the Church of the Redeemer, was consolidated with First Lutheran Church. First Lutheran is currently a part of the Upstate New York Synod of the ELCA. The current pastor is the Reverend D. Lowell Chilton.
