= National Register of Historic Places listings in Otter Tail County, Minnesota =

Location of Otter Tail County in Minnesota

This is a list of the National Register of Historic Places listings in Otter Tail County, Minnesota. It is intended to be a complete list of the properties and districts on the National Register of Historic Places in Otter Tail County, Minnesota, United States. The locations of National Register properties and districts for which the latitude and longitude coordinates are included below, may be seen in an online map.

There are 30 properties and districts listed on the National Register in the county. A supplementary list includes two additional sites that were formerly on the National Register.

This National Park Service list is complete through NPS recent listings posted February 20, 2026.

== Current listings ==
| | Name on the Register | Image | Date listed | Location | City or town | Description |
|---|---|---|---|---|---|---|
| 1 | Barnard Mortuary | Barnard Mortuary | August 13, 1986 (#86001538) | 119 N. Union Ave. 46°17′03″N 96°04′41″W | Fergus Falls | 1930 funeral home, a well-preserved and locally unique example of Mission Revival architecture applied to a commercial building. |
| 2 | O.A.E. Blyberg House | O.A.E. Blyberg House | February 16, 1984 (#84001631) | 22 5th Ave. SW; 46°33′51″N 96°05′05″W | Pelican Rapids | 1884 Italianate house with 1901–02 additions, built for an influential early settler, merchant, and land speculator. |
| 3 | C.C. Clement House | C.C. Clement House | August 13, 1986 (#86001485) | 608 N. Burlington Ave. 46°17′20″N 96°03′48″W | Fergus Falls | Picturesque local example of Stick style architecture, built in 1882. |
| 4 | Craigie Flour Mill Historical Marker | Craigie Flour Mill Historical Marker | January 16, 2003 (#02001704) | Minnesota Highway 78 at Balmoral Creek; 46°22′26″N 95°39′05″W | Otter Tail Township | 1940 example of the early roadside parks built by the Minnesota Department of Highways' Roadside Development Division in partnership with federal relief agencies. |
| 5 | District No. 182 School | District No. 182 School | August 9, 1991 (#91000978) | Off County Highway 35; 46°22′07″N 95°51′47″W | Underwood | School built 1939–40 by the Works Progress Administration, exemplifying a common federal work relief project of the Great Depression with a unique blend of Moderne architecture and split-stone construction. |
| 6 | Elizabeth Village Hall and Jail | Elizabeth Village Hall and Jail | February 16, 1984 (#84001634) | 207 Broadway Ave. 46°22′47″N 96°07′52″W | Elizabeth | 1898 city hall and slightly later jail addition reflecting the civic pride-inspired municipal improvements undertaken by many small Minnesota communities around the turn of the 20th century. |
| 7 | Fergus Falls City Hall | Fergus Falls City Hall | May 10, 1984 (#84001635) | 112 W. Washington Ave. 46°16′54″N 96°04′30″W | Fergus Falls | 1928 city hall significant as the home of many essential community services and for its design based on Independence Hall. |
| 8 | Fergus Falls State Hospital Complex | Fergus Falls State Hospital Complex | June 26, 1986 (#16000746) | 1400 Union Ave. N. and bounded by Fir Ave. and Park St. 46°17′58″N 96°04′54″W | Fergus Falls | State-run psychiatric hospital established in 1890, charting changes in Minnesota's treatment of those with mental illness. Boundary expanded in 2016 to encompass 26 contributing properties, including a rare surviving example of a Kirkbride Plan main complex, specialty buildings, and landscape architecture by Horace Cleveland. |
| 9 | First Baptist Church | First Baptist Church | April 17, 2025 (#100011725) | 101 W. Summit St. 46°16′59″N 95°42′52″W | Battle Lake | 1893 Gothic Revival church designed by Warren Dunnell; Battle Lake's leading example of the style and a rare small project from an architect better known for his large institutional buildings. |
| 10 | Fort Juelson | Fort Juelson | October 16, 2013 (#13000836) | 315th Ave. 46°16′21″N 95°49′50″W | Tordenskjold Township | Hilltop site of a Woodland period burial mound group and an 1876 sod fort built by white settlers during widespread fear of attack after the Sioux victory at the Battle of the Little Bighorn. Now a county park. |
| 11 | Ole and Anne Foss House | | January 29, 2025 (#100011340) | 301 Foss St. N. 46°17′16″N 95°52′04″W | Underwood | Highly intact 1869 log house, reflecting Norwegian settlement of the area and exhibiting a rare floor plan for its type. |
| 12 | Hotel Kaddatz | Hotel Kaddatz | February 24, 1983 (#83000924) | 111–113 W. Lincoln Ave. 46°17′00″N 96°04′30″W | Fergus Falls | Fergus Falls' first major hotel, built 1914–15; a key amenity underpinning the city's emergence as an important regional center. |
| 13 | Lewis House and Medical Office | Lewis House and Medical Office | December 29, 2021 (#100007309) | 415 Douglas Ave. 46°19′19″N 95°26′43″W | Henning | Residence and clinic of a family medical practice serving Henning and the surrounding area 1914–1990, illustrating the history of health and medicine in 20th-century rural Minnesota. Now a museum and community center. |
| 14 | Maplewood Site | Maplewood Site | December 18, 1978 (#78001555) | Address restricted | Pelican Rapids | Habitation site occupied 650–900 and 1450–1650. |
| 15 | John W. Mason House | John W. Mason House | August 13, 1986 (#86001533) | 205 W. Vernon Ave. 46°16′41″N 96°04′35″W | Fergus Falls | Circa-1881 house of political and civic leader John W. Mason (1846–1927), an early settler and first mayor of Fergus Falls. |
| 16 | Morrison Mounds | Morrison Mounds | June 4, 1973 (#73000991) | Address restricted | Battle Lake | c. 500–200 BCE mound group. |
| 17 | Northern Pacific Depot | Northern Pacific Depot | January 7, 2022 (#100007347) | 423 South Cascade St. 46°16′47″N 96°04′19″W | Fergus Falls | 1920 passenger and freight depot representing the importance of the railroad in the area's settlement and growth, and the rebuilding effort following the 1919 Fergus Falls tornado. |
| 18 | Orwell Site | Orwell Site | December 4, 1974 (#74001032) | Address restricted | Fergus Falls | Twelve Middle or Late Woodland period mounds, four enclosed by an earthwork. |
| 19 | Otter Tail County Courthouse | Otter Tail County Courthouse | May 10, 1984 (#84001637) | 121 W. Junius Ave. 46°16′48″N 96°04′30″W | Fergus Falls | Courthouse built 1921–22, significant as Otter Tail County's longstanding seat of government and its most prominent public building, and for its exemplary Beaux-Arts architecture. |
| 20 | Park Region Luther College | Park Region Luther College | November 8, 1984 (#84000241) | 715 W. Vernon Ave. 46°16′41″N 96°05′09″W | Fergus Falls | 1901 main building of a college active 1892–1932, noted for its Romanesque Revival architecture and role in making Fergus Falls a regional center of education. Since 1935 it has housed Hillcrest Lutheran Academy. |
| 21 | People's Union Church | People's Union Church | August 11, 2004 (#04000836) | 48566 205th Ave. 46°40′00″N 96°04′03″W | Scambler Township | 1915 church building, uniquely founded and maintained by a society of local women as a non-denominational house of worship. |
| 22 | Perham Village Hall and Fire Station | Perham Village Hall and Fire Station | July 31, 1986 (#86002122) | 153 E. Main; 46°35′38″N 95°34′18″W | Perham | Striking 1906 municipal hall designed by Fremont D. Orff, encapsulating the functional needs and civic pride of its community. |
| 23 | Phelps Mill | Phelps Mill | February 24, 1975 (#75002145) | 29035 County Highway 45; 46°22′49″N 95°49′16″W | Underwood | Restored gristmill complex active 1889–1939, including 33 years under influential head miller Ray Phelps. Now the centerpiece of a county park, and a contributing property to the Phelps Mill Historic District. |
| 24 | Phelps Mill Historic District | Phelps Mill Historic District | May 10, 1984 (#84001640) | County Highway 45; 46°22′49″N 95°49′15″W | Underwood | Well-preserved example of Minnesota's once-common rural milling communities, consisting of the 1889 mill, 1891 general store, and 1902 miller's house. |
| 25 | Prospect House | Prospect House | May 28, 2013 (#13000326) | 403 Lake Avenue N. 46°17′09″N 95°42′53″W | Battle Lake | Exemplary Georgian Revival house stemming from a 1929 conversion of an 1887 inn, reflecting the era's interest in authentic early American architecture. Now a museum. |
| 26 | Red River Milling Company | Red River Milling Company | May 14, 2021 (#100006557) | 309 Stanton Ave. W. 46°16′56″N 96°04′43″W | Fergus Falls | Last surviving example, built 1915–1919, of Fergus Falls' once numerous flour mills, and illustrating early-20th-century innovations such as reinforced concrete construction, large windows, and ability to run on either water or electrical power. |
| 27 | River Inn | River Inn | December 20, 1988 (#88002831) | 133 Mill St. S. 46°16′57″N 96°04′26″W | Fergus Falls | 1929 hotel that ameliorated Fergus Falls' economy and threats to relocate its federal district court during the Great Depression, and the downtown's only example of Medieval Revival architecture. |
| 28 | Trinity Lutheran Church | Trinity Lutheran Church | July 27, 2018 (#100002504) | 301 Douglas Ave. 46°19′23″N 95°26′54″W | Henning | 1898 Lutheran Free Church symbolizing the far-reaching effects of late-19th-century sectarianism on Norwegian Lutheran communities. Also noted for its distinctive Gothic Revival architecture. |
| 29 | United States Post Office and Courthouse | United States Post Office and Courthouse | October 24, 2012 (#12000879) | 118 S. Mill St. 46°16′58″N 96°04′28″W | Fergus Falls | 1904 federal building expanded in 1933, significant for its consistent Renaissance Revival architecture with Beaux-Arts elements and its contribution to downtown Fergus Falls' development as an important regional center. Now the Edward J. Devitt U.S. Courthouse and Federal Building. |
| 30 | C.J. Wright House | C.J. Wright House | November 30, 1978 (#78001554) | 831 Mount Faith Ave. E. 46°17′17″N 96°03′42″W | Fergus Falls | House built 1881–82, exemplifying the influence of Stick style on Minnesota's late-19th-century residential architecture. |

== Former listings ==
| | Name on the Register | Image | Date listed | Date removed | Location | City or town | Description |
|---|---|---|---|---|---|---|---|
| 1 | Henry G. Page House | | March 3, 1975 (#75001004) | November 13, 1987 | 219 N. Whitford St.(original address); Current coordinates are 46°17′03″N 96°03′44″W | Fergus Falls | 1870 Italianate house. Moved in 1977. Returned to Fergus Falls in 1999. |
| 2 | E. J. Webber House | | August 13, 1986 (#86001497) | May 22, 1992 | 506 W. Lincoln Ave.(original address); Current coordinates are 46°47′25″N 96°49′24″W | Fergus Falls | 1896 Queen Anne house designed by Omeyer & Thori. Moved to Fargo, North Dakota in 1991. Moved again in 2017. |

== See also ==
- List of National Historic Landmarks in Minnesota
- National Register of Historic Places listings in Minnesota
