= Orwell Site =

Orwell Site may refer to:

- Orwell site (Fergus Falls, Minnesota), listed on the National Register of Historic Places in Otter Tail County, Minnesota
- Orwell Site (Orwell, Vermont), listed on the National Register of Historic Places in Addison County, Vermont
