= River Inn =

River Inn may refer to:

- Inn (river), Switzerland, Austria, and Germany.
- River Inn (Fergus Falls, Minnesota), USA
- River Inn (Reno, Nevada), USA
