= Hotel Kaddatz =

Historic building in Fergus Falls, Minnesota, US

- U.S. National Register of Historic Places
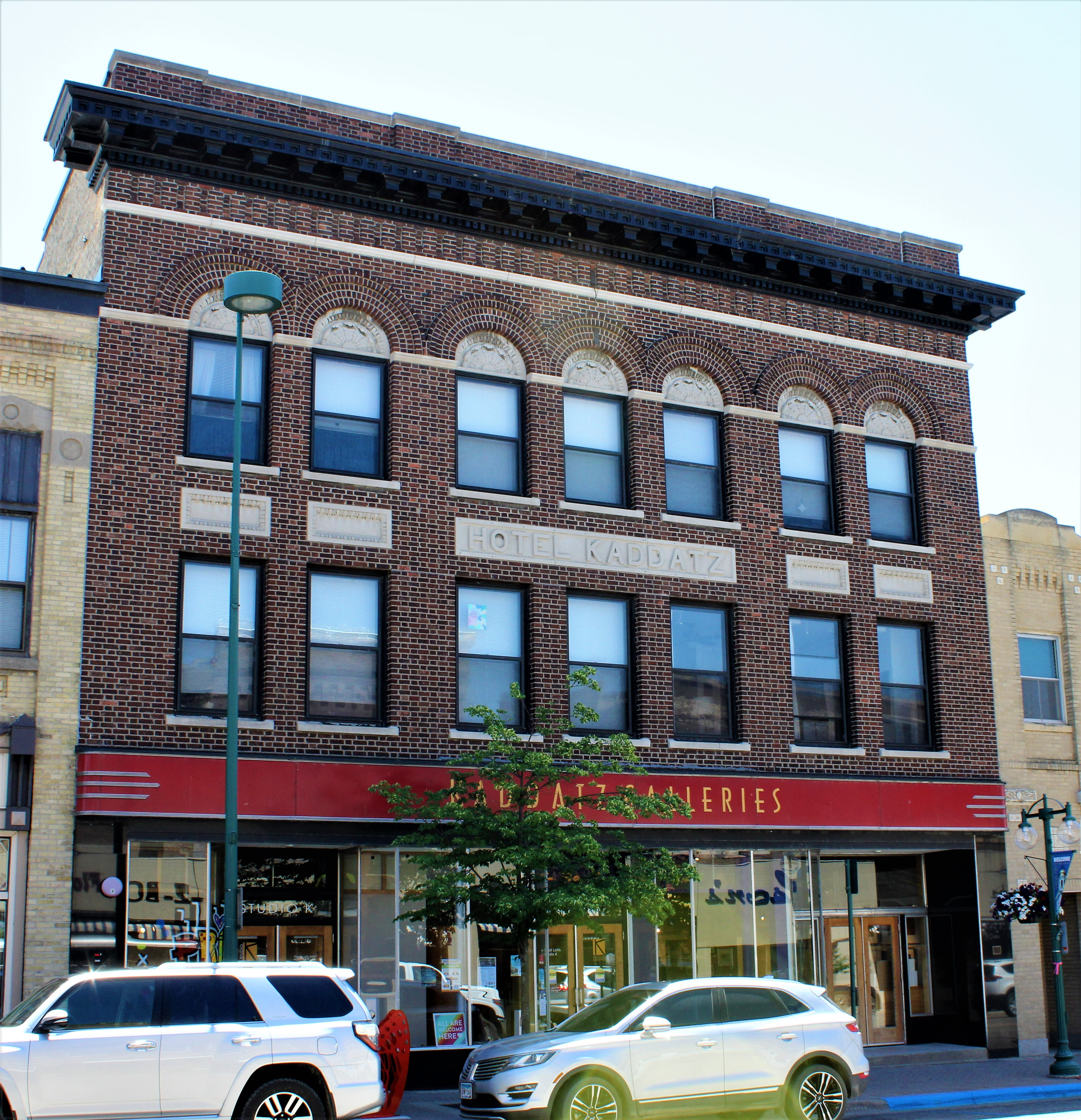

- Location within Minnesota Location within the United States
- Location: 111-113 W. Lincoln Ave. Fergus Falls, Minnesota
- Coordinates: 46°17′00″N 96°04′30″W
- Area: less than one acre
- Built: 1915
- Architect: George Hancock
- Architectural style: Renaissance Revival
- NRHP reference No.: 83000924
- Added to NRHP: February 24, 1983

Hotel Kaddatz, also known as the Hotel Wm. Barkley, is a historic building located in Fergus Falls, Minnesota, United States. Charles W. Kaddatz settled in town in 1886. He was involved in various commercial ventures when he started construction on the hotel in 1914. Completed the following year, it assured that the Federal Courthouse did not leave Fergus Falls. The hotel provided accommodations for judges, jurors, lawyers, and court visitors. It was eventually eclipsed by the River Inn as the city's premier hotel. The three-story dark brick structure was designed by Fargo architect George Hancock in the Renaissance Revival style. It featured 75 guest rooms, 30 of which had a private bath, sample rooms, and a restaurant. There was an annex across the alley that was accessed by a tunnel and an overhead enclosed bridge. It was condemned in 1981 and torn down. The hotel's name was changed to Hotel Wm. Barkley sometime after Barkley bought the hotel in 1920. The first floor was renovated about 1936 for retail purposes and the hotel lobby was reduced in size. In 1940 the Scott-Burr department store occupied the first floor. It is now an art gallery. The building was listed on the National Register of Historic Places in 1983.
