= People's Union Church =

Historic church in Minnesota, United States

- U.S. National Register of Historic Places
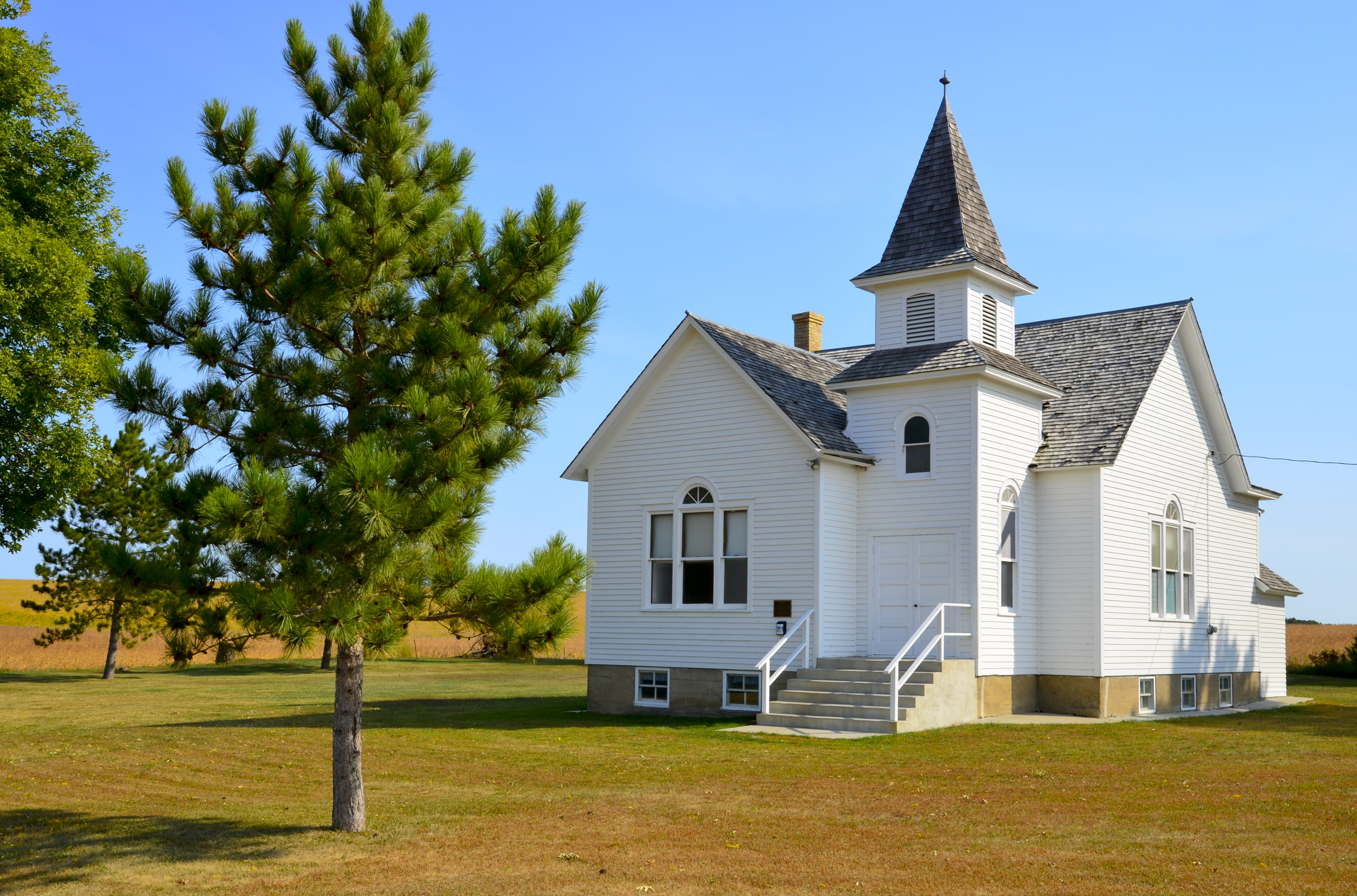

- Location within Minnesota Location within the United States
- Nearest city: Scambler Township, Minnesota
- Coordinates: 46°40′0″N 96°4′1″W
- Area: 1 acre (0.40 ha)
- Built: 1915
- Architect: Tandy, Douglas
- NRHP reference No.: 04000836
- Added to NRHP: August 11, 2004

People's Union Church (also known as Scambler Union United Church of Christ) is a historic church in Scambler Township, Minnesota, United States. Uniquely, it was founded in 1915 and maintained by a society of local women as a non-denominational house of worship. The church building was added to the National Register of Historic Places in 2004. The congregation is currently affiliated with the United Church of Christ (UCC).
