= Phelps Mill =

- U.S. National Register of Historic Places
- U.S. Historic district – Contributing property
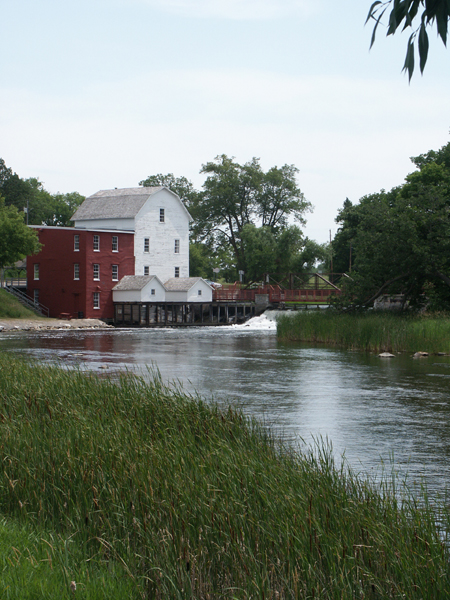
- The Otter Tail River as it passes Phelps Mill
- Nearest city: Underwood, Minnesota
- Coordinates: 46°22′50″N 95°49′14″W
- Built: 1889
- Part of: Phelps Mill Historic District (ID84001640)
- NRHP reference No.: 75002145
- Added to NRHP: February 24, 1975

Phelps Mill is a flour mill in Otter Tail County, Minnesota, United States, on the Otter Tail River. The mill was built in 1888–1889 by William E. Thomas, a local entrepreneur who owned a flour and feed business in Fergus Falls. During that time, wheat was a high-demand crop, and nearly one thousand flour mills were in operation throughout Minnesota. Thomas began constructing a wooden dam on the river in the spring of 1888, although the dam was prone to leakage and had to be shored up with sandbags, dirt, gravel, and other materials. The mill itself was built by Royal Powers, who built and framed the mill without using blueprints. He was able to keep the entire plan within his head and did not even have to mark out the lumber he was cutting.

The mill opened in October 1889 and was designed to produce 60 to 75 barrels of flour per day. It was very successful during its initial several years of operation, and in 1895 Thomas built an addition to grind buckwheat and rye. Thomas also built a bunkhouse for overnight guests and a barn for stabling horses. A general store also was established in the area and is still in operation.

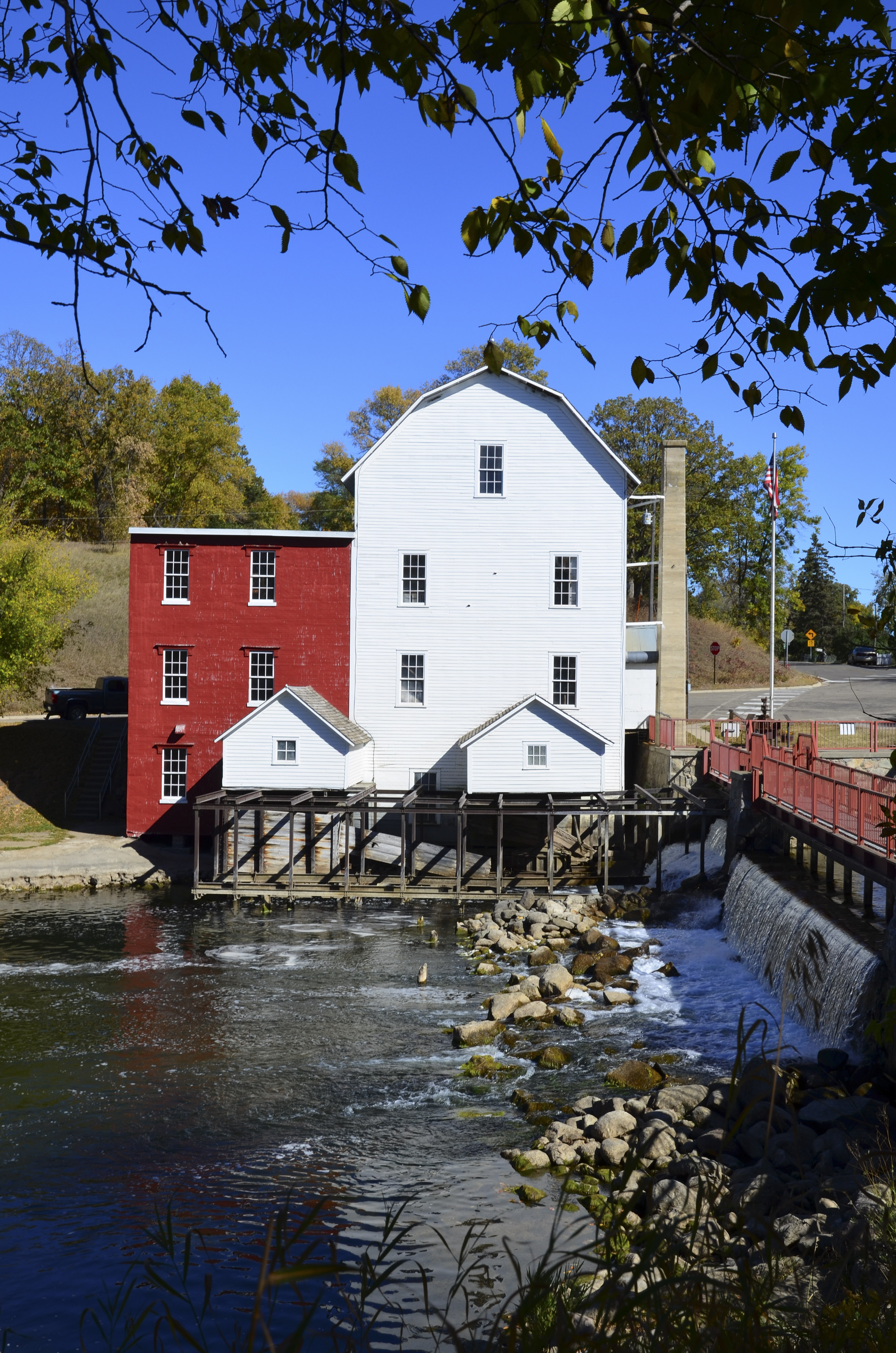
The mill in 2012

As technology progressed in the early 1900s, though, power from electricity, gasoline, or steam became more efficient for powering mills. Railroad transportation also made it more cost-effective to transport the grain to the Minneapolis-St. Paul area for milling. Thomas sold the mill in 1919, and after another change of ownership in 1928, the mill closed for good in 1939.

A local resident and activist, Geneva Tweten, led a campaign to save the mill as a symbol of the rural life. Otter Tail County purchased the site in 1965, and it was listed on the National Register of Historic Places in 1975. The mill is part of the Phelps Mill Historic District, which also includes the general store and an Italianate miller's house.
