= Fergus Falls station (Northern Pacific Railway) =

- Northern Pacific Depot
- U.S. National Register of Historic Places
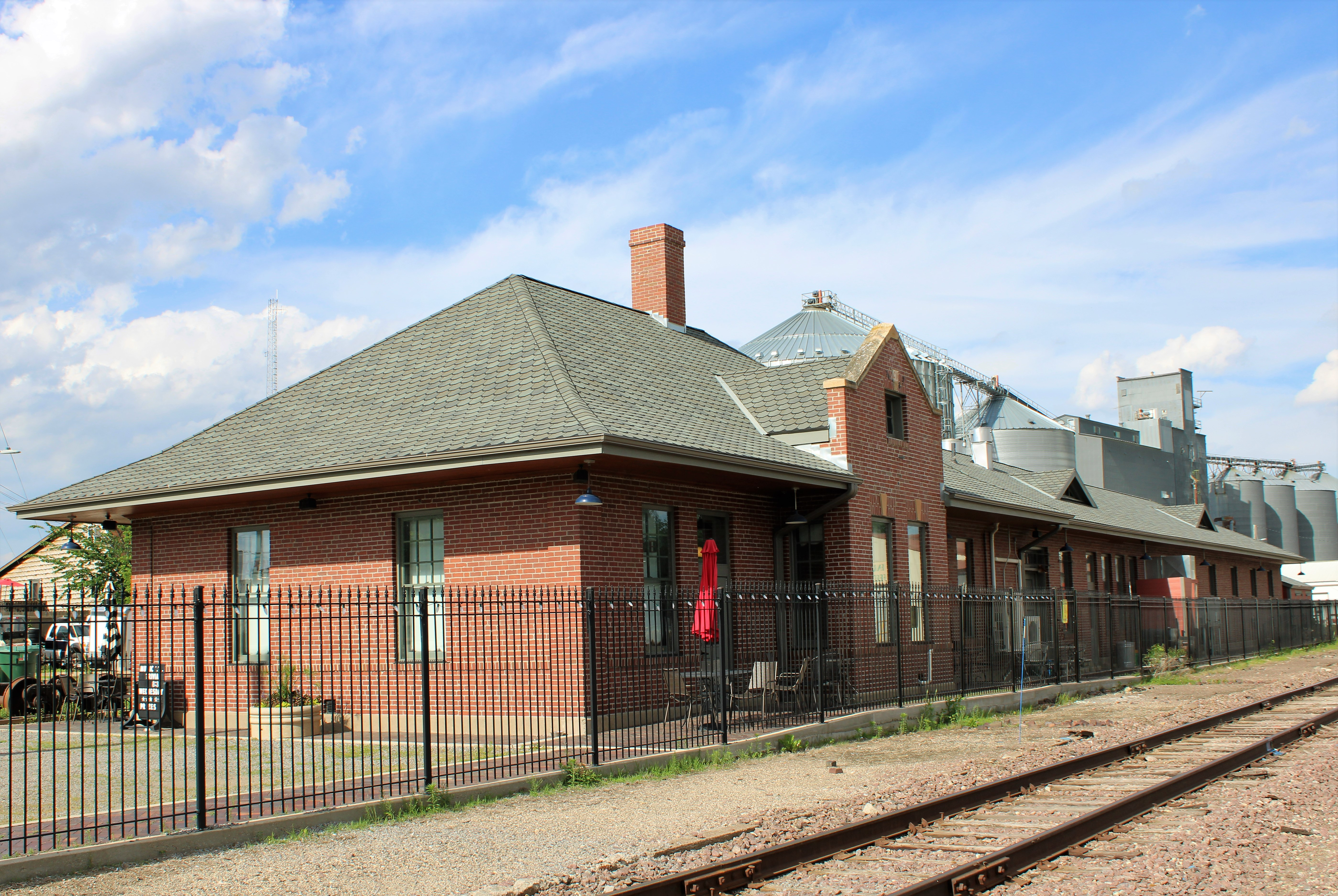

- Location within Minnesota Location within the United States
- Location: 423 S. Cascade St. Fergus Falls, Minnesota
- Coordinates: 46°16′46.9″N 96°04′18.2″W
- Area: less than one acre
- Built: 1920
- Built by: J.E. Conlin
- Architectural style: Classical Revival
- MPS: Railroads in Minnesota MPS
- NRHP reference No.: 100007347
- Added to NRHP: January 7, 2022

Fergus Falls station is a historic building located in Fergus Falls, Minnesota, United States. It was listed on the National Register of Historic Places in 2022 as the Northern Pacific Depot.

== History ==
The St. Paul, Minneapolis & Manitoba Railway, later known as the Great Northern Railway, was the first railroad to reach Fergus Falls in 1879. George B. Wright, who developed the city, continued to lobby the Northern Pacific Railway to come here and they arrived in 1882. Its first depot was located on the site of the present building. The wood-frame structure suffered two fires with the second fire destroying it in 1892. The second depot at this location was also a wood-frame building that was destroyed in fire in 1903. A third frame depot was completed the same year and it was destroyed in the 1919 Fergus Falls tornado.

The present brick Neoclassical depot was completed in 1920. The combination passenger and freight depot was built on the location of the former freight depot. It was a larger facility than any other of the previous depots in Fergus Falls, which suggests the increase in business for the Northern Pacific over the years. The last passenger train left the depot in 1959. The facility continued to serve as a freight depot until 1970 when it closed after the Northern Pacific merged with other railroads to form the Burlington Northern Railroad. Operations in Fergus Falls were transferred to the former Great Northern Depot, which now houses the Otter Tail Valley Railroad. After sitting empty for years, the former Northern Pacific depot was renovated in 2014. It now houses a restaurant.

Preceding station	Northern Pacific Railway	Following station
Foxhome toward Oakes	Fergus Falls Branch	Wall Lake toward Wadena
