= Red River Milling Company =

- U.S. National Register of Historic Places
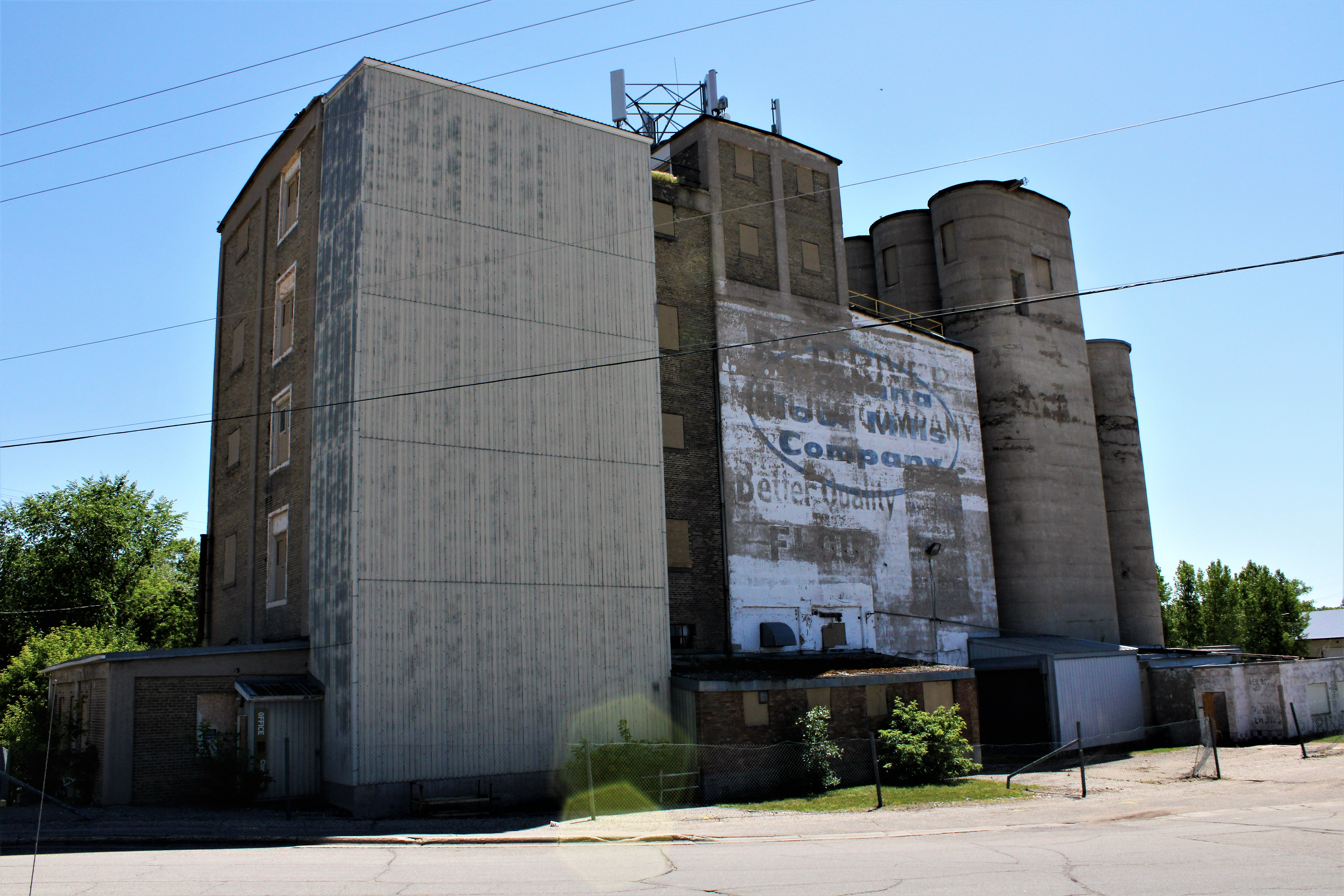
- North elevation

- Location within Minnesota Location within the United States
- Location: 309 Stanton Ave. W. Fergus Falls, Minnesota
- Coordinates: 46°16′55.9″N 96°04′42.6″W
- Area: 2.5 acres (1.0 ha)
- Built: 1915, 1919
- Architect: Barnett & Record Company
- NRHP reference No.: 100006557
- Added to NRHP: May 14, 2021

Red River Milling Company is a historic building and structures in Fergus Falls, Minnesota, United States. The city's first mill was built at this location on the north side of the Otter Tail River in 1872. The location was a good one for water power as the river drops in elevation 85 feet (26 m) within Fergus Falls and 150 feet (46 m) from just east to just west of the city. The mill expanded over time as frame buildings were constructed on the site. They were destroyed in a fire of unknown origins on March 10, 1915.

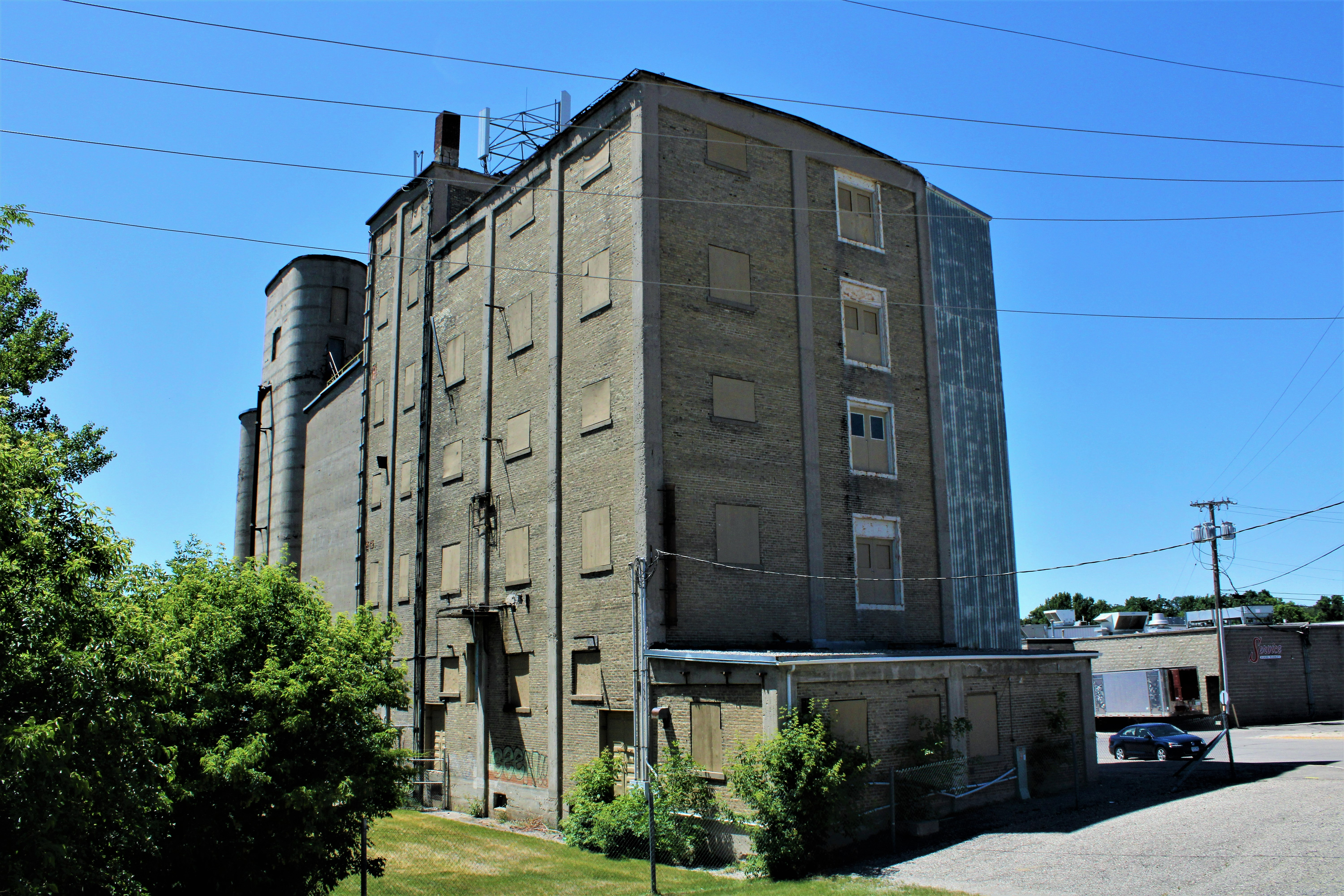
South elevation

Barnett & Record Company of Minneapolis designed and built the present concrete and brick structure. The mill's machinery was built by Wolf & Company of Chambersburg, Pennsylvania and the building was designed to fit the machinery. It was ready for operation by late November 1915. It survived the 1919 Fergus Falls tornado but the 1903 elevator, which survived the 1915 fire, was destroyed. A new concrete elevator at the west side of the complex was completed the same year. A new warehouse and six steel storage bins were constructed on the west side of the mill in 1957 and eight more bins were added two years later. After several changes in ownership over the years, the mill remained in operation until the late 1980s when it was abandoned. The warehouse and steel bins were removed in 1998. The mill was listed on the National Register of Historic Places in 2021.

The remaining complex is significant as the last remaining flour mill in Fergus Falls, an industry that was once important to the local economy. The mill also represents the transition period between the use of waterpower and electricity. The mill was designed to operate on both, but waterpower ended sometime in the early 1920s when the Lower Dam was removed from the river. Because it survived an F5 tornado, the mill attests to the durability of reinforced concrete.

In August of 2025, the mill was reopened as The Mill Boutique Hotel. The hotel was renovated with 32 rooms that contain the original brick and concrete.
