= Fort Juelson =

- U.S. National Register of Historic Places
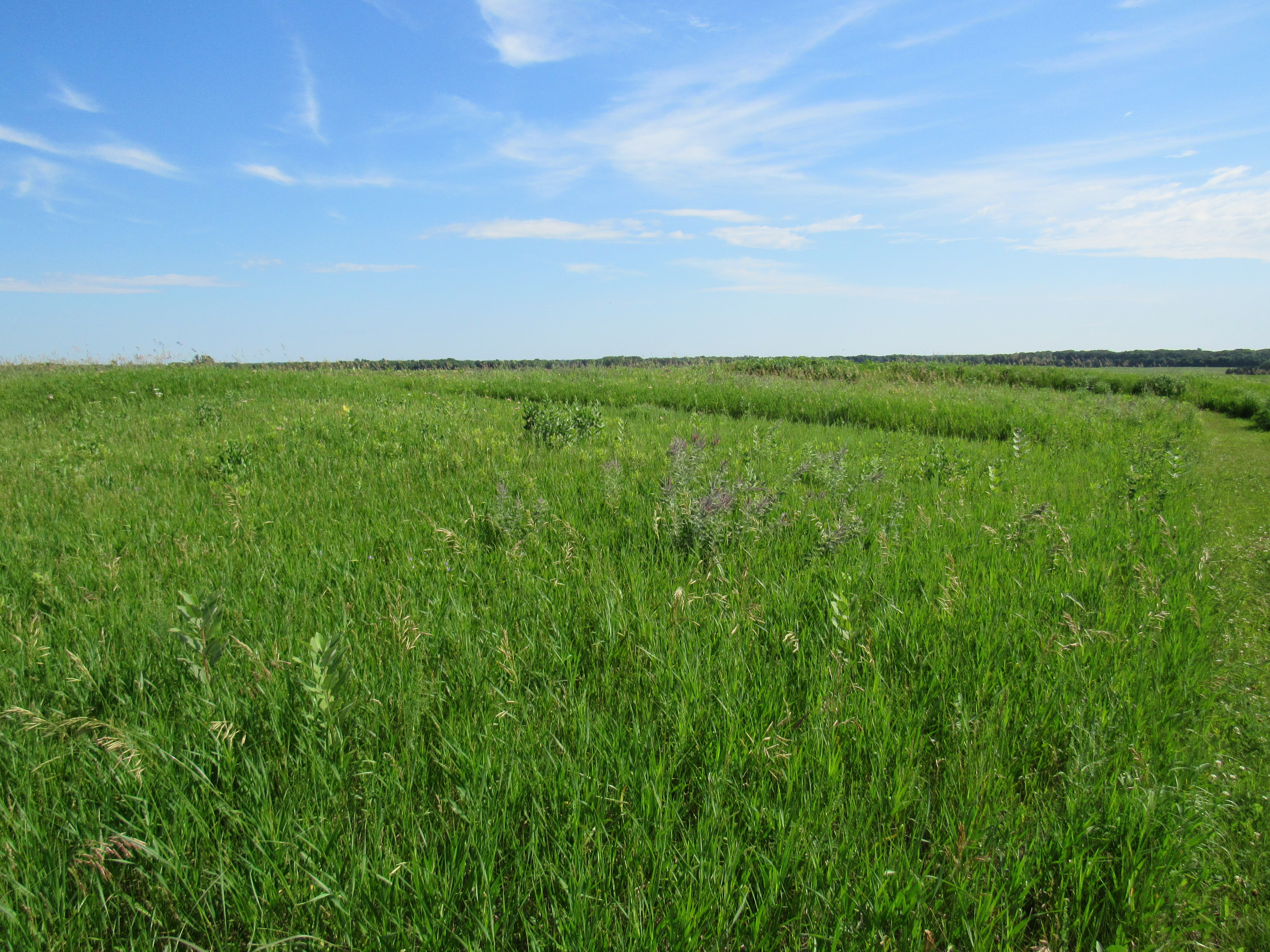
- Interior of what remains of the sod fort.
- Location: Address restricted
- NRHP reference No.: 13000836
- Added to NRHP: October 16, 2013

Fort Juelson, designated 21OT198 in the state archaeological inventory, is a historic site located in Tordenskjold Township and about two miles east of Underwood, Minnesota, United States. An earthen fort was built on the hilltop in July 1876 after rumors of Indian attacks in Foxhome, French, and Fergus Falls following the Battle of Little Bighorn in Montana. Many settlers left the area. Charles A. Dollner, a local merchant, suggested the rest of the people band together and build the fortification under leadership of two American Civil War veterans, Hans Juelson and Berge O. Lee. The scare proved to be a hoax, and the fort was never used for defensive purposes. Remnants of the sod barricade are still on the site.

It was discovered that the fort was built on the site of a Woodland period burial mound group, which is also a part of this historic designation. It is made up of four small elliptical and linear burial mounds. Two of the mounds were located inside the fort, one was along the western wall of the fort, and one is located 12 meters (39 ft) west of the fort. The site was listed on the National Register of Historic Places in 2013.

== History ==
Following more than 100,000 European settlers in the 1850s in the Dakota territory, tensions arose over disputes of land ownership between the settlers and the Dakota. At Battle of the Little Bighorn, the US Army was defeated and rumors spread of "Indian depredations", which drove away thousands of settlers from Minnesota. Hence, some Norwegian settlers, led by Hans Juelson and Berge O. Lee, constructed the fort atop the hill, which was also a burial mound built by Native Americans during the Woodlands period sometime between 800 BC and 1700 AD, to utilize its location as a defensive advantage.

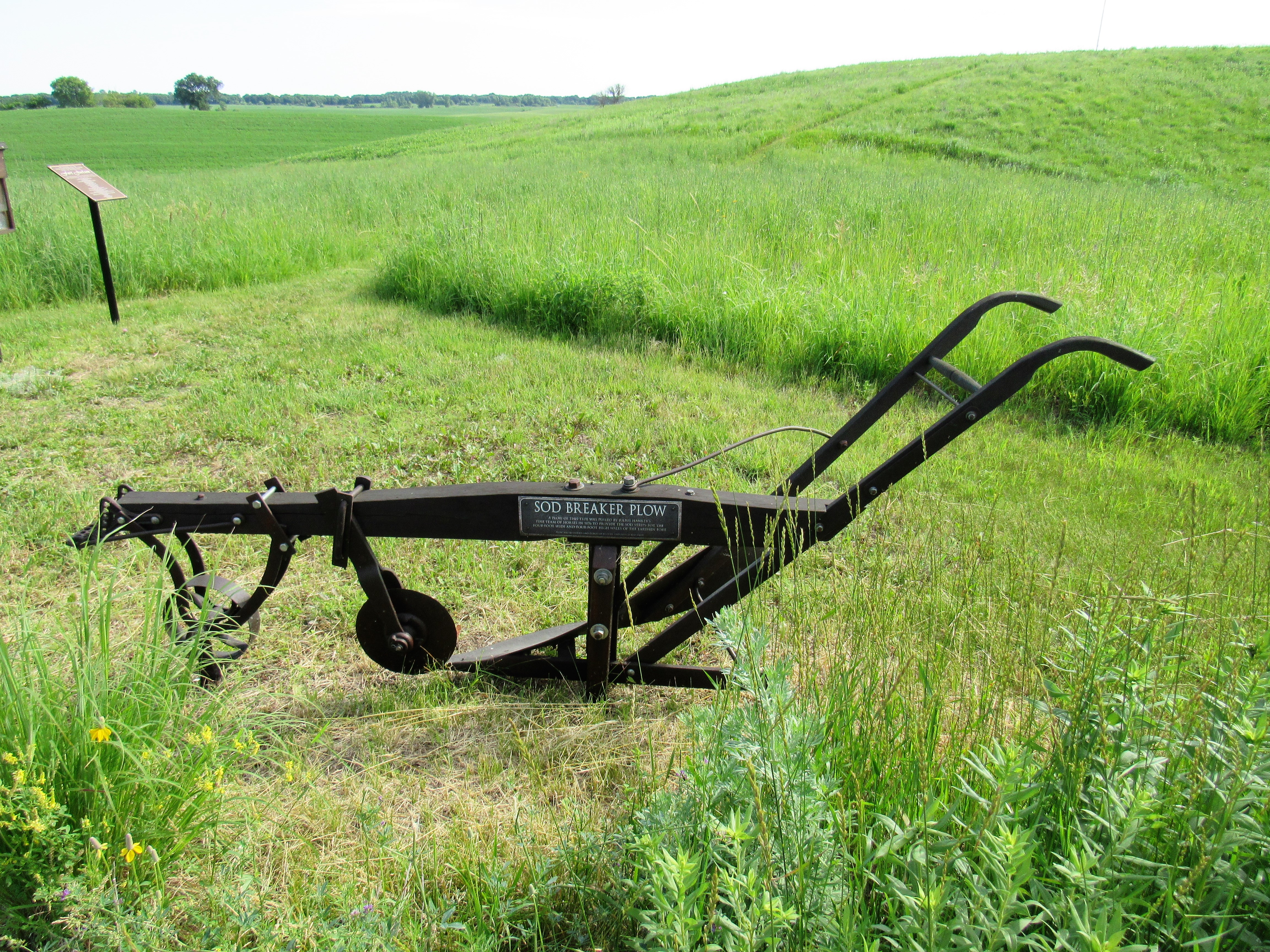
A plow of this type, as depicted, was used for the construction of the sod fort.

Completed in July 1876, the earthen fort consisted of an area of about 100 feet by 120 feet surrounded by four sod walls, each four feet thick and four feet high, and with two interior cross walls through its center. Following its construction, a Norwegian homemade bear gun, owned by John Bjorge and built by his father Syrak, was used to shoot at a wall of the fort, and the bullet did not penetrate the walls. A fence was also constructed around the fort as an additional defensive barricade and to prevent grazing cattle from eating at the fort.

During the fort's construction, human remains were found, which were reburied. This aligns with the later discovery of the burial mounds during an archaeological survey. Four elliptical and linear burial mounds were found, with two located inside the fort, one along the western wall of the fort, and one located 12 meters (39 ft) west of the fort.

== Preservation ==
The Friends of Fort Juelson is a formally organized group founded January 12, 2009, consisting of about 25 members to preserve the site and cooperate with the owner of the site and Otter Tail County. Later, in 2010, Stanley Rudsenske donated the land that the fort is located on to Otter Tail County. The site was restored and a dedication to Otter Tail County residents was held on June 11, 2011. The renovated site features signs, a flag, split rail fencing, and a gateway in which visitors can begin their walk to the hill.

In 2012, the Otter Tail County Historical Society conducted an archaeological survey of the area using funds from the Minnesota Historical and Cultural Heritage Grants program. Using non-invasive technology and techniques, including light detection and ranging, ground-penetrating radar, electrical resistivity tomography, and magnetic field gradient survey, the society was able to find burial mounds below the surface alongside archaeological remains from the fort. This was used as evidence to nominate the site to the National Register of Historic Places in May 2013. On October 16, 2013, the site was listed on the NRHP.

== Gallery ==
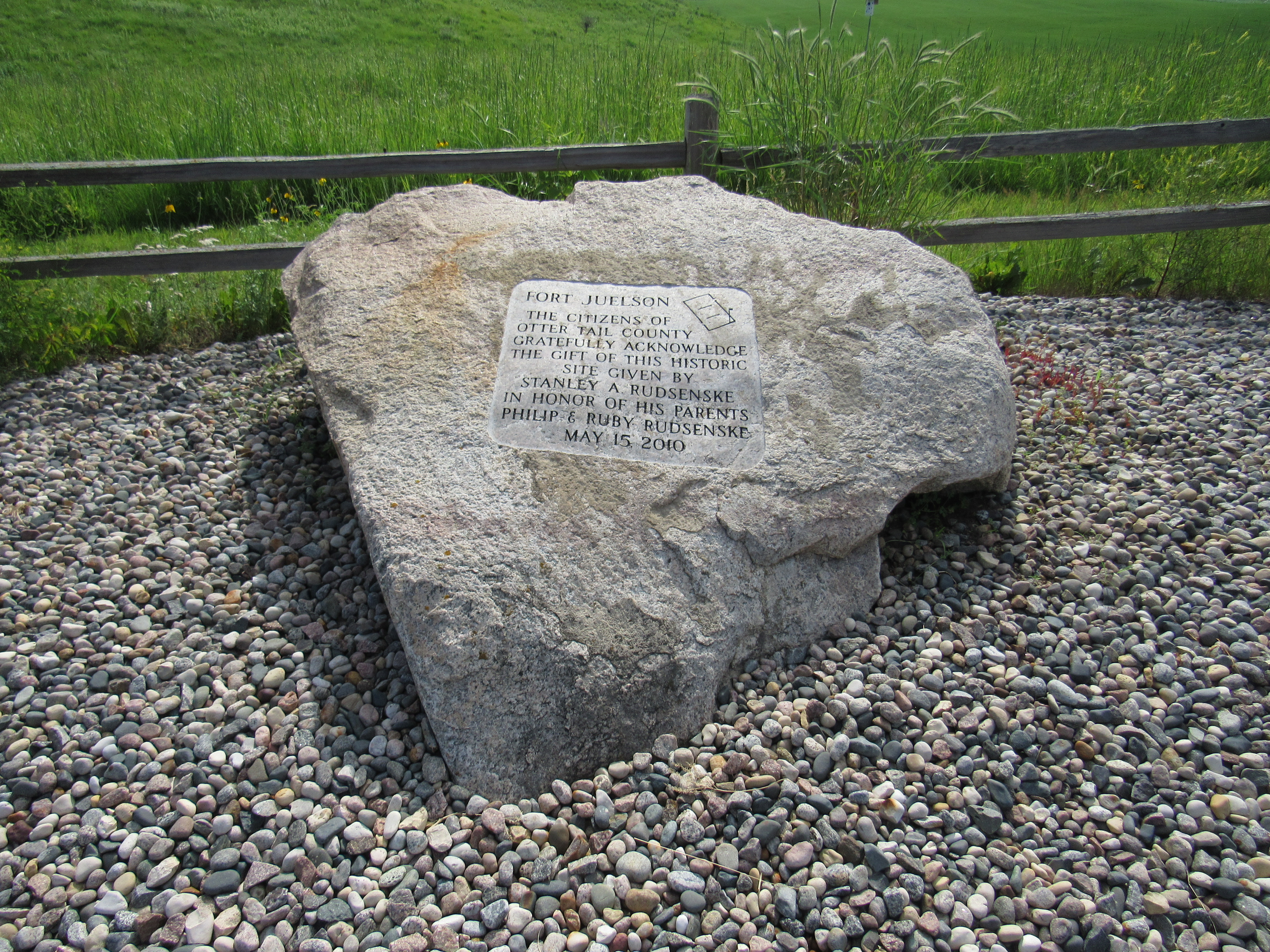

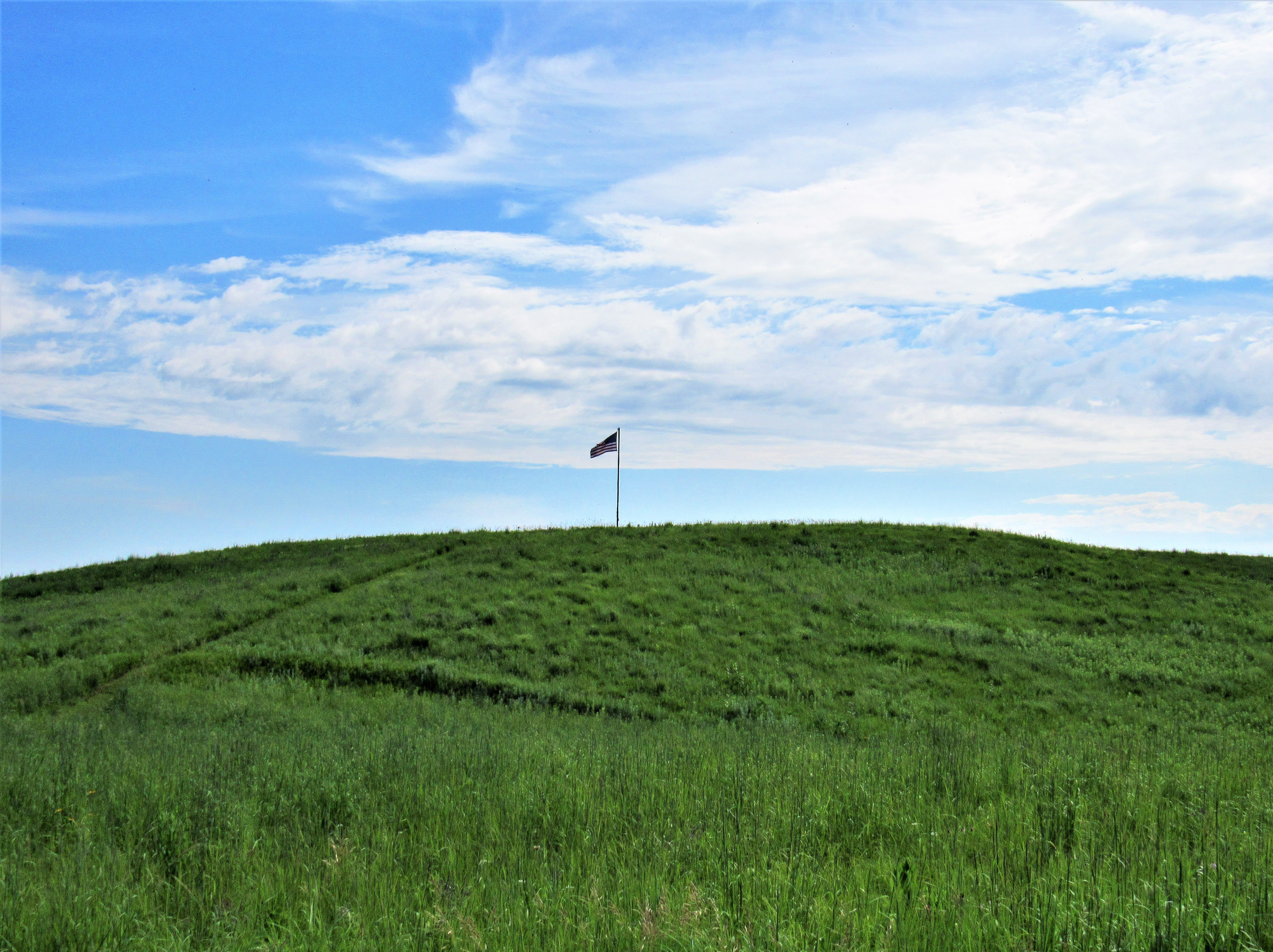

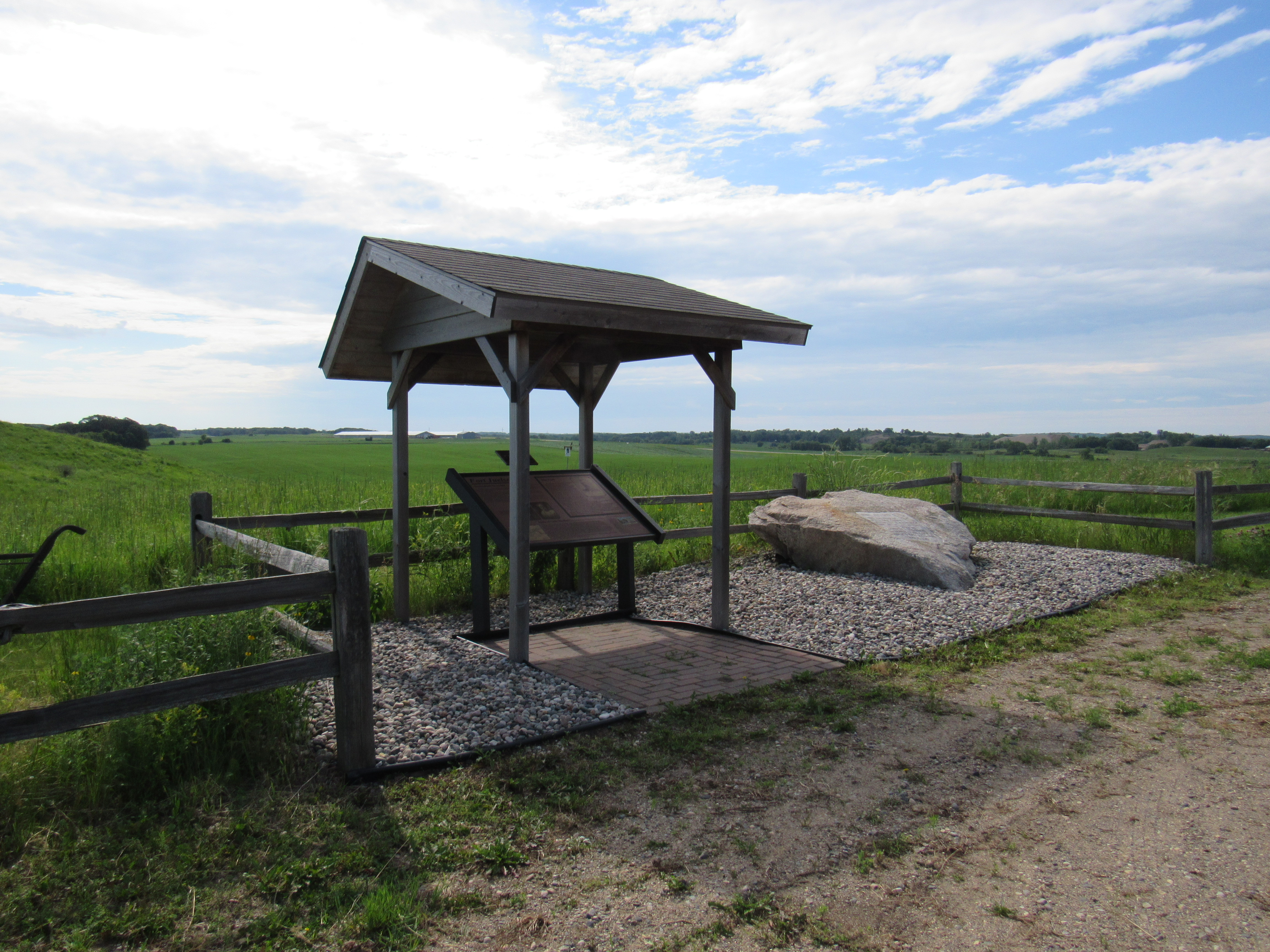

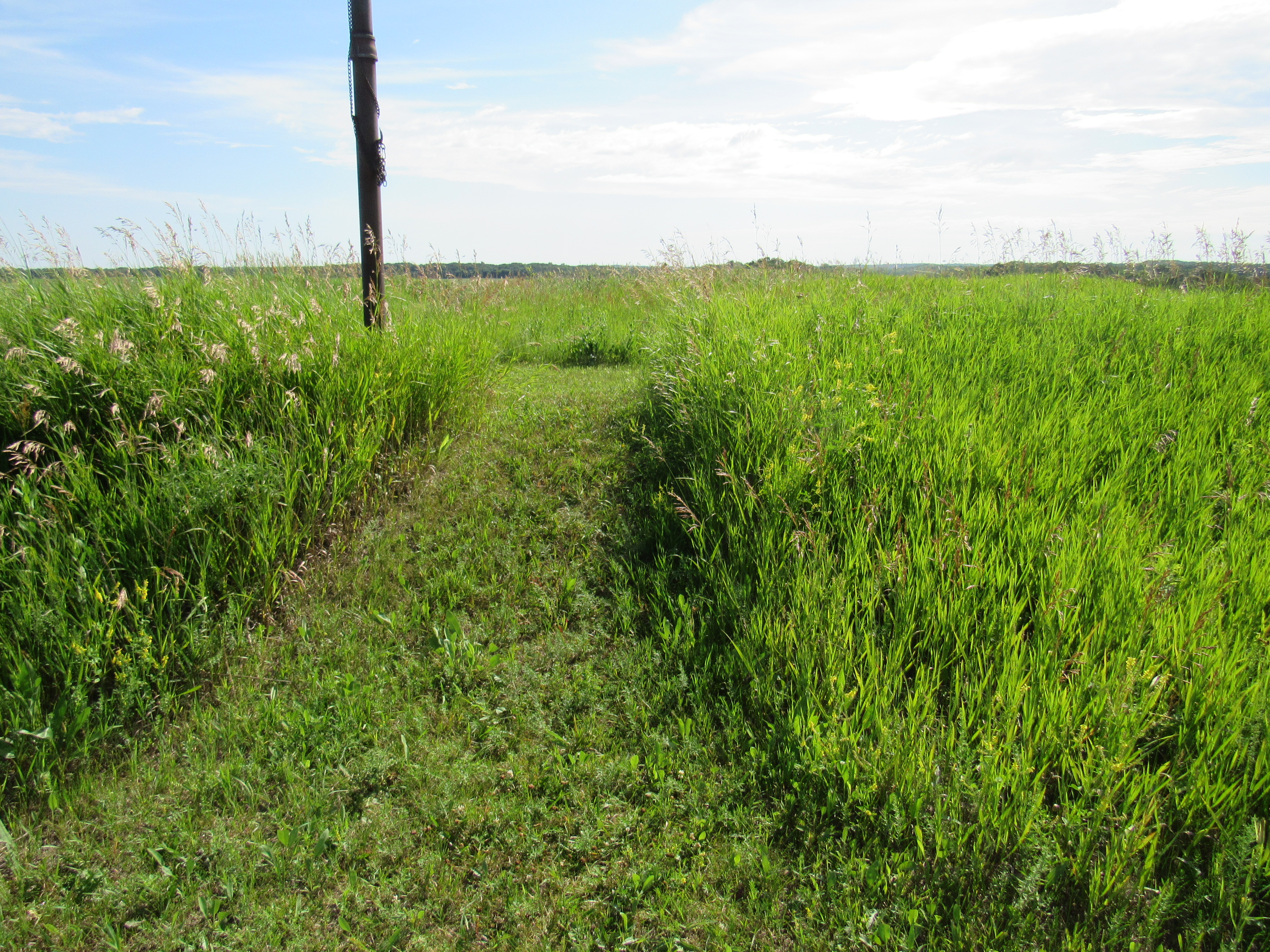

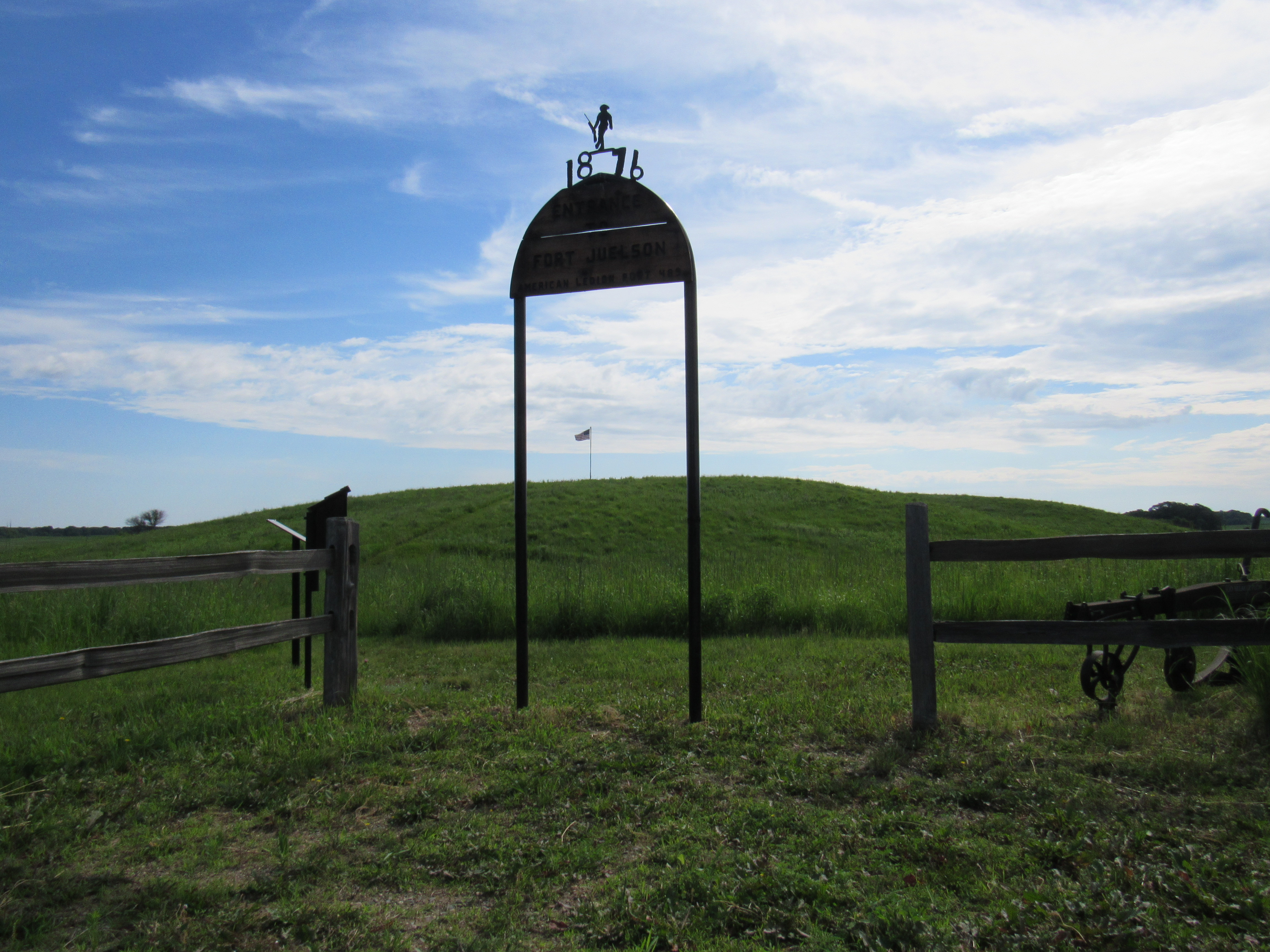

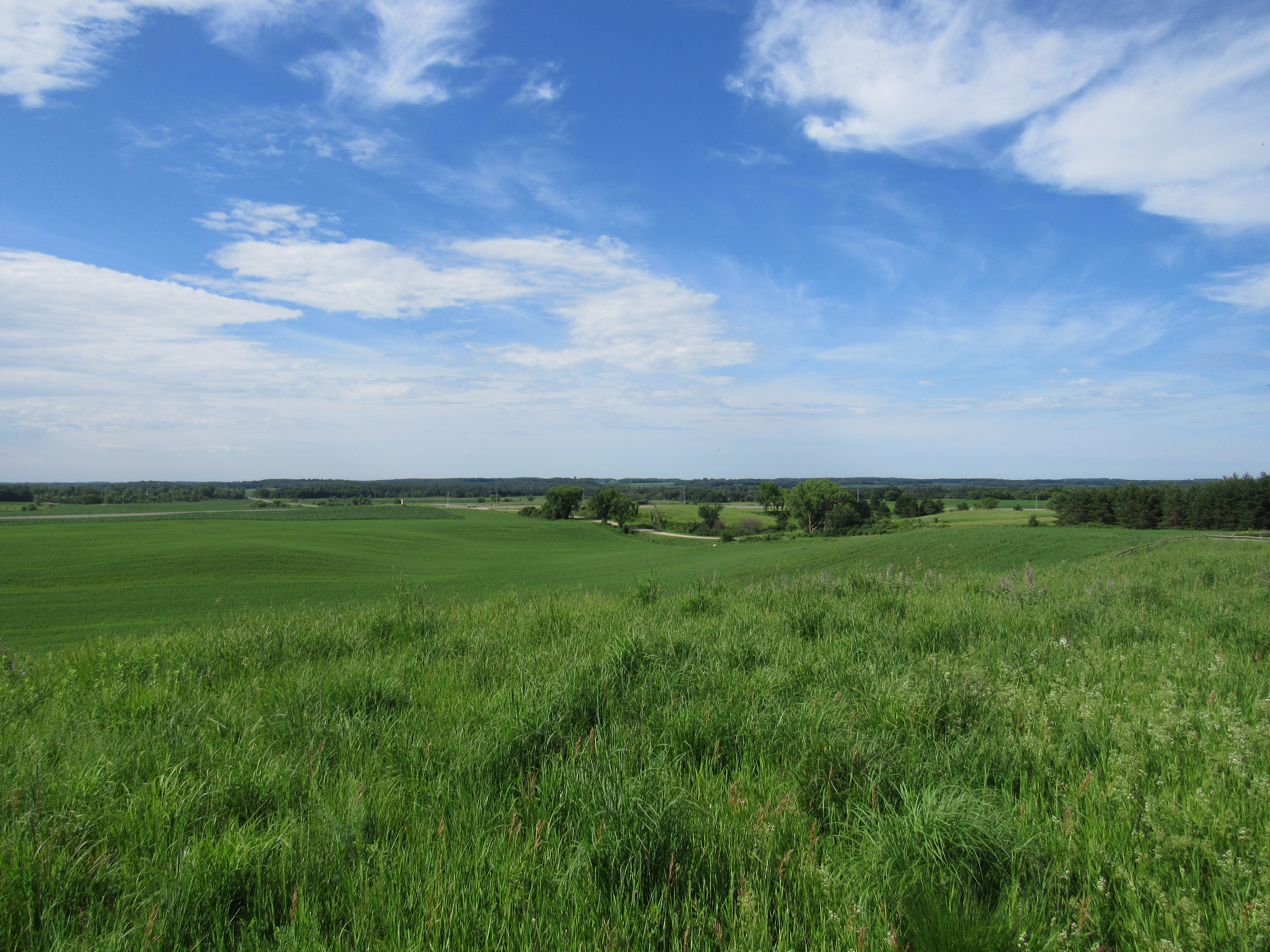
