= Orwell Site (Orwell, Vermont) =

- U.S. National Register of Historic Places
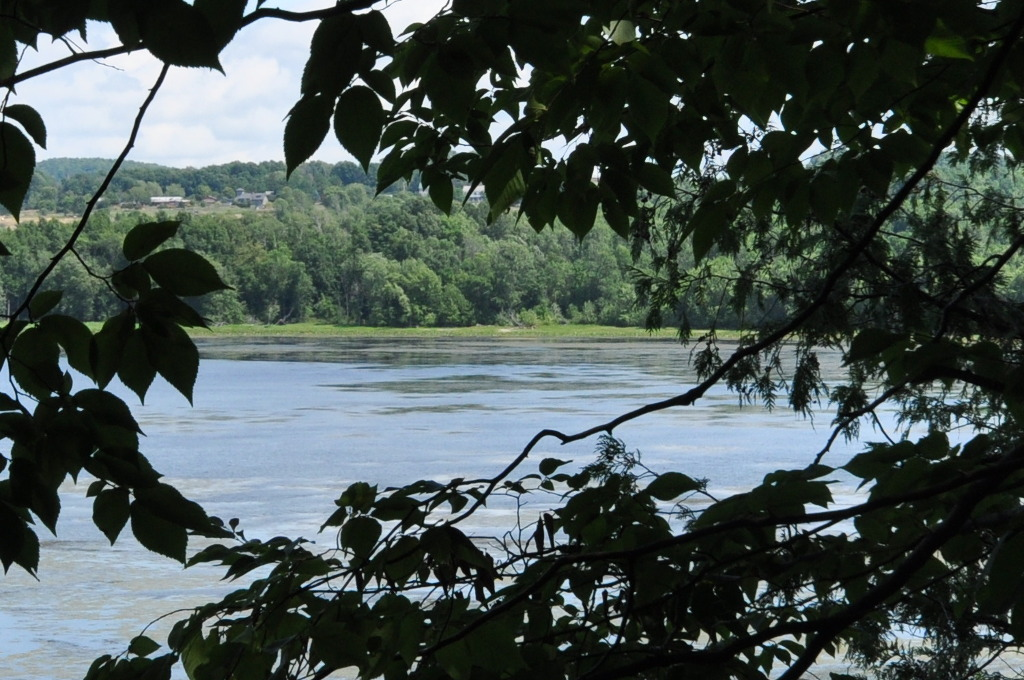
- A view across the water toward where the site is located
- Location: Orwell, Vermont
- Area: 15 acres (6.1 ha)
- NRHP reference No.: 77000094
- Added to NRHP: April 11, 1977

The Orwell Site, designated VT-AD-12 in the state archaeological inventory, is a mainly prehistoric archaeological site in Orwell, Vermont. The site, first investigated in 1933, is significant as one of the state's few documented examples of a heavily stratified site, with layered evidence of occupation extending back at least 2,000 years, and into colonial times. It includes a prehistoric Native American burial site with at least 46 grave sites. It was listed on the National Register of Historic Places in 1977.

== Description ==
The Orwell Site consists of 15 acres (6.1 ha) located in a waterfront area, which has been repeatedly subjected to flooding over the period of significance. These events have deposited as much as 30 inches (76 cm) of sand and silt over a period of about 2,500 years, and is surrounded by heavier clay soils. The site exhibits evidence of repeated intensive occupation, with finds datable to the Archaic and Woodland periods. Upper layers of the site include evidence of colonial habitation (clay pipes, musket balls, and buttons) and signs of more recent uses (modern fishhooks and beer cans). Finds in the deepest layers include extensive quantities of stone tools and tool-making byproducts, as well as copper beads, quartz crystals, and pottery fragments from the Adena culture. At the lowest levels, early investigators found 46 human burials.

The first documented investigation of the site was by Godfrey Olsen in 1933, who was hired by the Heye Foundation to survey the area. Detailed reports of Olsen's work appear to have been lost, and the next report on the site, made in 1948, is of dubious reliability. Many of the site's finds are now at the George Gustav Heye Center, the New York City branch of the Smithsonian Institution's National Museum of the American Indian. The site has been largely undisturbed since the 1933 excavation, with only occasional agricultural use.

== See also ==
- National Register of Historic Places listings in Addison County, Vermont
