= Barnard Mortuary =

- U.S. National Register of Historic Places
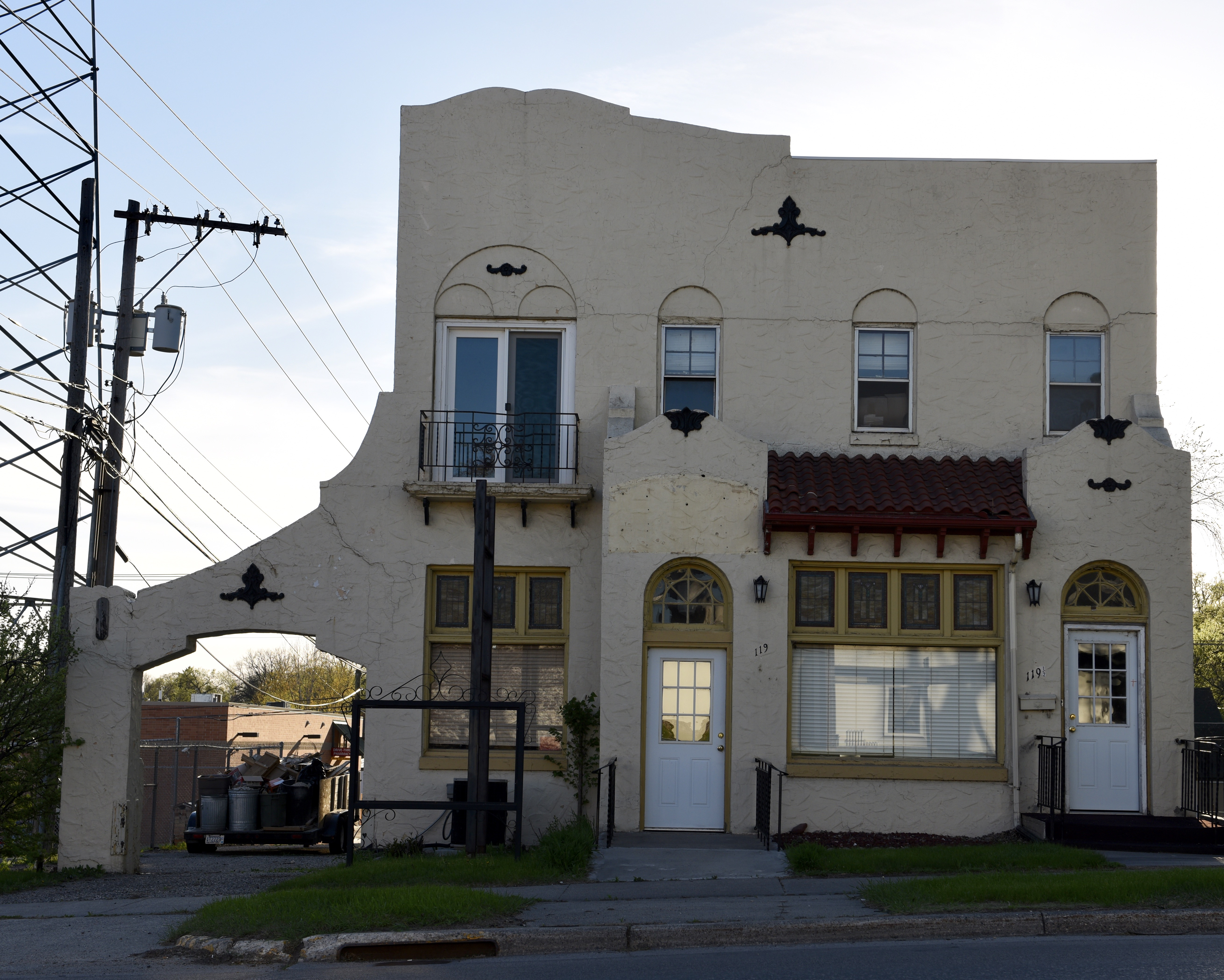

- Location within Minnesota Location within the United States
- Location: 119 N. Union Ave. Fergus Falls, Minnesota
- Coordinates: 46°17′03″N 96°04′41″W
- Area: less than one acre
- Built: 1930
- Built by: J.P. Johnson
- Architect: Walter R. Dennis
- Architectural style: Mission/Spanish Colonial
- NRHP reference No.: 86001538
- Added to NRHP: August 13, 1986

Barnard Mortuary is a historic building located in Fergus Falls, Minnesota, United States. Designed by Minneapolis architect Walter R. Dennis, this is a rare local example of the Mission Revival style. J.P. Johnson was the contractor who completed the building in 1930 for Edward T. Barnard. Barnard was a Minneapolis native who arrived in town in 1880. He worked for the Fergus Falls Journal until about 1900 when he established a furniture store and funeral home. Barnard discontinued the furniture business at the time he had this building constructed. He remained in business until 1946 when he sold it to Otto and Ben Benson. It has had several owners since then.

The building's Mission Revival style elements are found in the round arches of the facade, the balcony, the barrel tiles, the curvilinear lines of the gables, and the smooth stucco surfaces. It was listed on the National Register of Historic Places in 1986.
