= Orwell site (Fergus Falls, Minnesota) =

- Orwell Site
- U.S. National Register of Historic Places
- Location: Address restricted
- Nearest city: Fergus Falls, Minnesota
- NRHP reference No.: 74001032
- Added to NRHP: December 4, 1974

The Orwell Site, designated 21OT7 in the state archaeological inventory, is a historic site located near Fergus Falls, Minnesota, United States. It consists of twelve Middle or Late Woodland period burial mounds, four of which are enclosed by an earthwork. They were built from about A.D. 350–600. They share similarities with the mounds found at Fort Juelson, also in Otter Tail County, with their central burial chamber. The site was listed on the National Register of Historic Places in 1974.
