= Tordenskjold Township, Otter Tail County, Minnesota =

Tordenskjold Township, Minnesota
- Township
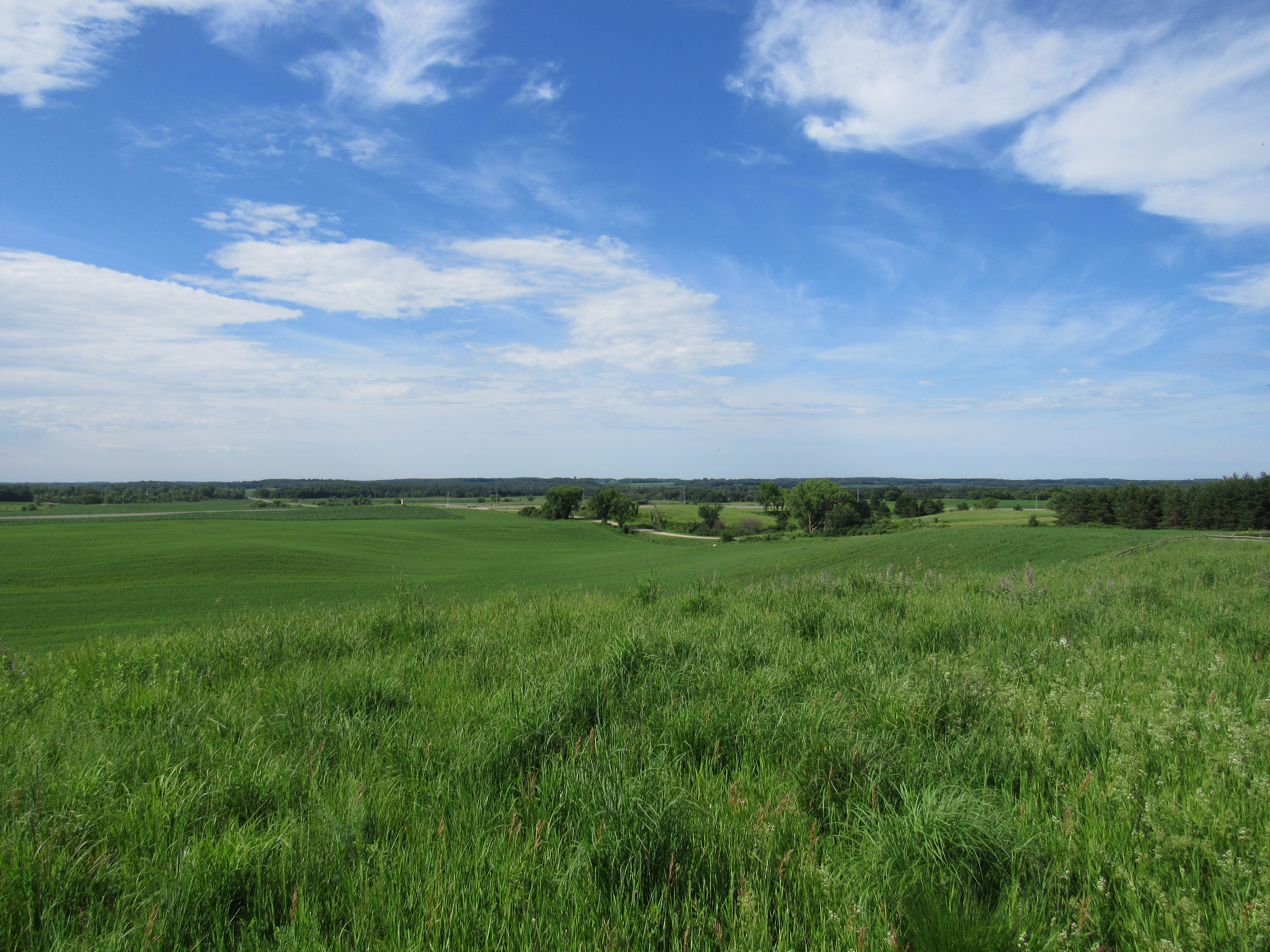
- The view from Fort Juelson overlooking the township to the south.

- Location of Tordenskjold Township, within Otter Tail County, Minnesota

- Location within the state of Minnesota Tordenskjold Township, Minnesota (the United States)
- Coordinates: 46°14′4″N 95°50′28″W
- Country: United States
- State: Minnesota
- County: Otter Tail

Area
  - Total: 36.0 sq mi (93.3 km^{2})
  - Land: 30.5 sq mi (78.9 km^{2})
  - Water: 5.6 sq mi (14.4 km^{2})
- Elevation: 1,335 ft (407 m)

Population (2020)
  - Total: 527
  - Density: 17.3/sq mi (6.68/km^{2})
- Time zone: UTC-6 (Central (CST))
  - Summer (DST): UTC-5 (CDT)
- FIPS code: 27-65218
- GNIS feature ID: 0665798

Tordenskjold Township is a township in Otter Tail County, Minnesota, United States. The population was 527 at the 2020 census.

== Geography ==
According to the United States Census Bureau, the township has a total area of 36.0 square miles (93.3 km^{2}), of which 30.5 square miles (78.9 km^{2}) is land and 5.6 square miles (14.4 km^{2}) (15.44%) is water.

== History ==
Tordenskjold Township was originally called Blooming Grove Township, and under the latter name was organized in 1869. After many Norwegians immigrated to the area, the township adopted its present name in 1870. It is named after Vice-Admiral Peter Tordenskjold, a Danish-Norwegian naval hero during the Great Northern War.

Even though no town was ever platted in Tordenskjold, it was designated the county seat of Otter Tail County in 1870. The next year, in 1871, the county seat was moved to Otter Tail City.

== Demographics ==
As of the census of 2000, there were 550 people, 217 households, and 170 families living in the township. The population density was 18.1 people per square mile (7.0/km^{2}). There were 373 housing units at an average density of 12.2/sq mi (4.7/km^{2}). The racial makeup of the township was 98.73% White, 0.18% Native American, 0.18% Asian, and 0.91% from two or more races. Hispanic or Latino of any race were 0.55% of the population.

There were 217 households, out of which 31.3% had children under the age of 18 living with them, 69.1% were married couples living together, 3.2% had a female householder with no husband present, and 21.2% were non-families. 18.9% of all households were made up of individuals, and 8.8% had someone living alone who was 65 years of age or older. The average household size was 2.53 and the average family size was 2.86.

In the township the population was spread out, with 24.4% under the age of 18, 6.5% from 18 to 24, 23.6% from 25 to 44, 27.6% from 45 to 64, and 17.8% who were 65 years of age or older. The median age was 43 years. For every 100 females, there were 114.8 males. For every 100 females age 18 and over, there were 109.0 males.

The median income for a household in the township was $37,981, and the median income for a family was $41,944. Males had a median income of $28,438 versus $21,071 for females. The per capita income for the township was $18,229. About 3.3% of families and 5.1% of the population were below the poverty line, including 2.1% of those under age 18 and 3.7% of those age 65 or over.
