= C.J. Wright House =

Historic house in Minnesota, United States

- U.S. National Register of Historic Places
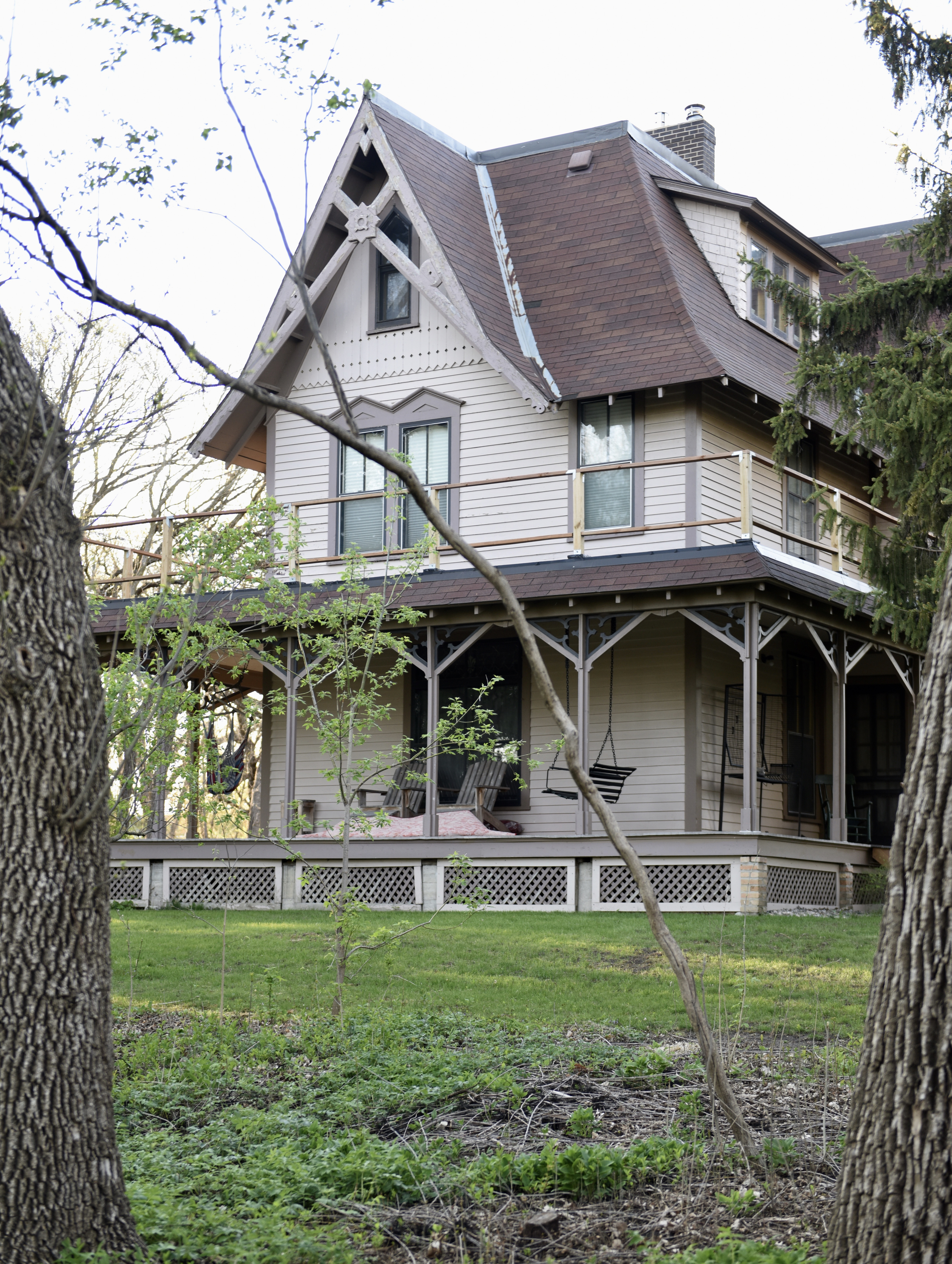

- Location within Minnesota Location within the United States
- Location: 831 Mount Faith Ave., E. Fergus Falls, Minnesota
- Coordinates: 46°17′17″N 96°03′42″W
- Area: 4.66 acres (1.89 ha)
- Built: 1881-1882
- Built by: J.O. Crummett
- Architect: Leroy S. Buffington
- Architectural style: Queen Anne
- NRHP reference No.: 78001554
- Added to NRHP: November 30, 1978

The C.J. Wright House is a historic building located in Fergus Falls, Minnesota, United States. Minneapolis architect Leroy S. Buffington supplied the designs for this 2½-story wood frame residence. Isaac H. Hobbs & Son, architect firm from Philadelphia created the house drawings. Local carpenter J.O. Crummett built it from 1881 to 1882. Construction began under the direction of George B. Wright and completed by his nephew C.J. Wright. The Wrights were Vermont natives who surveyed and were involved in developing the new town of Fergus Falls. The Queen Anne style structure follows an irregular plan. It is also a Stick style variant of the Gothic Revival style. The Gothic Revival is found in the scissor-trusses with an eight-pointed star medallion on each of the gables and the scroll-sawn spandrels of the wrap-around front porch. The house was listed on the National Register of Historic Places in 1978. The house has seen 6 generations of continuous family ownership.

The house is situated in a wooded tract and is not visible from the street; many neighborhood residents are unaware of its existence. Small arches were cut out of 3 of the original doors for cat passage. The main floor of the house, including the ornate parlor with its walnut mantle and parquet floor, was rented out for most of the late 20th century with the daughter of C.J. Wright occupying the second floor. The beautifully carved fireplace once resided at the George B. Wright home in Minneapolis and was a gift to this house at the time of the demolition of the Minneapolis home. It is fitting as George B. Wright drew his last breath in this house when it was in its final days of completion. The quiet of the country hilltop, after the finishing carpenters and maids were sent away, was just what was needed for the dying man. George had planned out everything including the driveway and even planted the many trees. The lady of this new home, Myra Wright, wife of C.J. stated, George was the "finest man I have ever known."
