= Elizabeth Village Hall and Jail =

- U.S. National Register of Historic Places
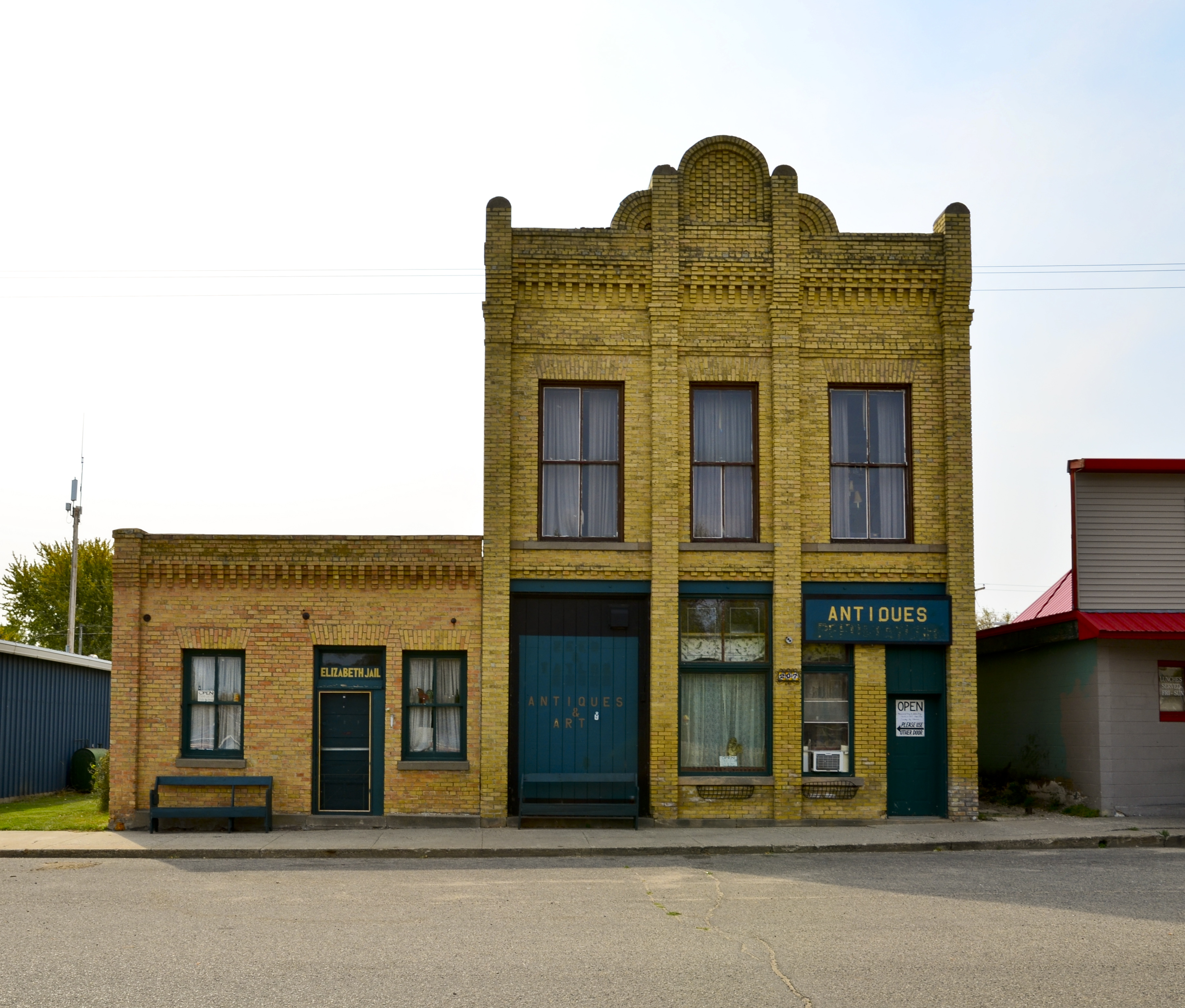

- Location within Minnesota Location within the United States
- Location: Broadway Ave. Elizabeth, Minnesota
- Coordinates: 46°22′47″N 96°07′52″W
- Area: less than one acre
- Built: 1898
- NRHP reference No.: 84001634
- Added to NRHP: February 16, 1984

Elizabeth Village Hall and Jail is the seat of the local government and a historic building located in Elizabeth, Minnesota, United States. Completed in 1898, the two-story brick structure replaced a single-story wood-frame structure that was later used as the township hall. The single-story jail was added a short time later. At one time the first floor of the two-story portion of the building housed the fire department. The main facade of the building features four two-story pilasters that terminate at the ornate cornice. The jail is similar is design to the city hall. The jail is now used as the city's polling place, and the first floor of the city hall now houses retail space. The building was listed on the National Register of Historic Places in 1984.
