= Elizabeth, Minnesota =

City in Minnesota, United States

- City
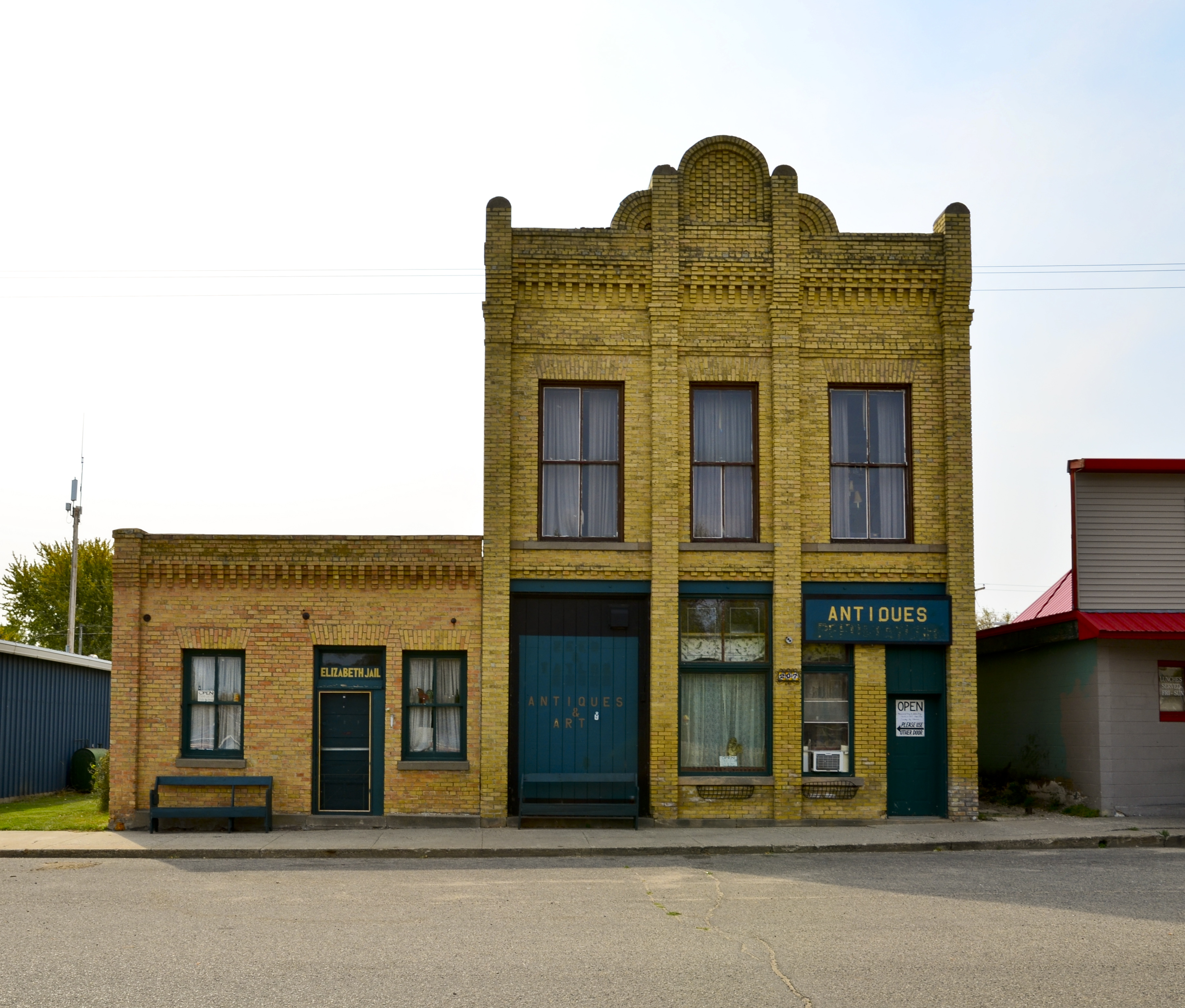
- Elizabeth Village Hall and Jail

- Location of Elizabeth, Minnesota
- Coordinates: 46°22′45″N 96°07′46″W
- Country: United States
- State: Minnesota
- County: Otter Tail
- Platted: 1872
- Incorporated: November 21, 1884

Government
  - Mayor: Eugene Bogenreif

Area
  - Total: 0.374 sq mi (0.969 km^{2})
  - Land: 0.373 sq mi (0.967 km^{2})
  - Water: 0.0012 sq mi (0.003 km^{2})
- Elevation: 1,263 ft (385 m)

Population (2020)
  - Total: 168
  - Estimate (2022): 165
  - Density: 450/sq mi (173.8/km^{2})
- Time zone: UTC−6 (Central (CST))
  - Summer (DST): UTC−5 (CDT)
- ZIP Code: 56533
- Area code: 218
- FIPS code: 27-18566
- GNIS feature ID: 2394646
- Sales tax: 7.375%

Elizabeth is a city in Otter Tail County, Minnesota, United States. The population was 168 at the 2020 census.

== History ==
Elizabeth was platted in 1872, and named for Elizabeth Niggler, the wife of an early settler. A post office was established under the name Elizabethtown in 1871, and the name was changed to Elizabeth in 1882.

== Geography ==
According to the United States Census Bureau, the city has a total area of 0.373 square miles (0.97 km^{2}), all land.

== Demographics ==
Historical population
Census	Pop.	Note	%±
1880	128		—
1890	135		5.5%
1900	186		37.8%
1910	169		−9.1%
1920	204		20.7%
1930	164		−19.6%
1940	176		7.3%
1950	168		−4.5%
1960	168		0.0%
1970	188		11.9%
1980	195		3.7%
1990	152		−22.1%
2000	172		13.2%
2010	173		0.6%
2020	168		−2.9%
2022 (est.)	165		−1.8%
U.S. Decennial Census; 2020 Census

=== 2010 census ===
As of the 2010 census, there were 173 people, 66 households, and 49 families living in the city. The population density was 467.6 inhabitants per square mile (180.5/km^{2}). There were 84 housing units at an average density of 227.0 per square mile (87.6/km^{2}). The racial makeup of the city was 93.6% White, 2.9% African American, 1.7% Native American, 0.6% Asian, and 1.2% from two or more races.

There were 66 households, of which 30.3% had children under the age of 18 living with them, 65.2% were married couples living together, 4.5% had a female householder with no husband present, 4.5% had a male householder with no wife present, and 25.8% were non-families. 19.7% of all households were made up of individuals, and 3% had someone living alone who was 65 years of age or older. The average household size was 2.62 and the average family size was 3.08.

The median age in the city was 43.8 years. 24.3% of residents were under the age of 18; 5.1% were between the ages of 18 and 24; 24.3% were from 25 to 44; 34.7% were from 45 to 64; and 11.6% were 65 years of age or older. The gender makeup of the city was 54.9% male and 45.1% female.

=== 2000 census ===
As of the 2000 census, there were 172 people, 72 households, and 42 families living in the city. The population density was 473.5 inhabitants per square mile (182.8/km^{2}). There were 85 housing units at an average density of 234.0 per square mile (90.3/km^{2}). The racial makeup of the city was 98.26% White, 1.16% Native American, and 0.58% from two or more races.

There were 72 households, out of which 31.9% had children under the age of 18 living with them, 47.2% were married couples living together, 9.7% had a female householder with no husband present, and 40.3% were non-families. 30.6% of all households were made up of individuals, and 11.1% had someone living alone who was 65 years of age or older. The average household size was 2.39 and the average family size was 3.05.

In the city, the population was spread out, with 26.2% under the age of 18, 7.0% from 18 to 24, 31.4% from 25 to 44, 24.4% from 45 to 64, and 11.0% who were 65 years of age or older. The median age was 38 years. For every 100 females, there were 112.3 males. For every 100 females age 18 and over, there were 104.8 males.

The median income for a household in the city was $33,438, and the median income for a family was $38,333. Males had a median income of $28,750 versus $20,625 for females. The per capita income for the city was $13,841. About 2.1% of families and 8.0% of the population were below the poverty line, including 6.0% of those under the age of eighteen and none of those 65 or over.

== Climate ==
The Köppen Climate Classification subtype for this climate is "Dfb". (Warm Summer Continental Climate).

Climate data for Elizabeth, Minnesota
Month	Jan	Feb	Mar	Apr	May	Jun	Jul	Aug	Sep	Oct	Nov	Dec	Year
Mean daily maximum °F (°C)	17 (−8)	22 (−6)	36 (2)	54 (12)	68 (20)	77 (25)	82 (28)	81 (27)	70 (21)	57 (14)	37 (3)	23 (−5)	52 (11)
Mean daily minimum °F (°C)	−2 (−19)	3 (−16)	17 (−8)	32 (0)	45 (7)	55 (13)	60 (16)	57 (14)	48 (9)	36 (2)	21 (−6)	6 (−14)	32 (0)
Average precipitation inches (mm)	0.9 (23)	0.7 (18)	1.2 (30)	2.1 (53)	3.0 (76)	4.2 (110)	3.4 (86)	3.0 (76)	2.4 (61)	1.7 (43)	1.1 (28)	0.7 (18)	24.3 (620)
Average precipitation days	9	7	8	9	11	12	9	9	9	7	8	8	106
Source: Weatherbase
