= River Inn (Reno, Nevada) =

- Interactive map of the River Inn area
- Former names: Laughton's/Lawton's Hot Springs (until 1963); Holiday Lodge (1963–1970); Rodeway Inn and Holiday Spa (1970–1972)

General information
- Location: 9400 West Fourth Street, Reno, Nevada, United States
- Coordinates: 39.512223°N 119.908728°W
- Completed: 1963 (motel structure); Early 1980s (unopened casino)
- Opened: 1884 (Laughton's Hot Springs); 1963 (Holiday Lodge)
- Closed: December 15, 1978
- Owner: Lawrence McNutt

Other information
- Number of rooms: 88

Website
- therivern.com

River Inn is a closed casino resort located alongside the Truckee River in Reno, Nevada. It was built in an area known for its hot spring. Granite Hot Springs operated on the site as early as the 1870s, later becoming Laughton's Hot Springs in 1884. The latter was opened by Sumner Laughton, who later changed the name to Lawton's Hot Springs, reflecting a common misspelling of his surname.

The local Yori family owned the resort from 1936 to 1970 and leased it to numerous people during that time. In the 1950s, Lawton's included a restaurant, slot machines, and a cocktail lounge. The property also offered a nine-hole golf course into the 1960s. New leasees renovated and expanded the resort in 1963, renaming it the Holiday Lodge. The expansion included a new motel structure as well as a casino.

In 1970, it was renovated to become the Rodeway Inn and Holiday Spa, part of the Rodeway Inns chain. It was renamed the River Inn two years later. An RV park was added in 1973. The resort later filed for Chapter 11 bankruptcy and was closed on December 15, 1978; it has not reopened since then.

Developer George Benny planned to reopen the resort in the early 1980s and added an A-frame casino structure to the property. In 1984, he was sentenced to 30 years in prison for financial-related crimes. Businessman T.M. Chang later made several failed attempts to renovate and reopen the resort. In 2020, the River Inn was sold to businessman Lawrence McNutt, who planned to make it his personal residence.

== History ==
The River Inn was built alongside the Truckee River in an area known for its hot spring. The site dates as far back as the 1870s, when it was known as Granite Hot Springs. Sumner Laughton (also known as Samuel Laughton) bought the site in 1884 and renamed it Laughton's Hot Springs. The name was later changed to Lawton's Hot Springs, reflecting a common misspelling of Laughton's surname.

The Yori family of Reno acquired the resort in 1936 and leased it out to numerous people over the years. A midget car racing track was constructed on the property in 1937. A year later, the track was remodeled for greyhound racing. Lawton's Hot Springs was popular among celebrities, including boxers Max Baer and Jack Dempsey. In 1939, athlete Helen Crlenkovich performed a diving exhibition at the resort.

Four businessmen from Covina, California took over operations in 1957 and announced plans to expand the resort. At the time, it had 25 motel rooms, a restaurant, slot machines, a cocktail lounge, and a nine-hole golf course. One of the businessmen, Bob Siegel, became the sole operator in early 1958.

=== Name changes and final years ===
In 1962, operation of Lawton's Hot Springs was taken over by three couples from California. They launched a $400,000 remodeling project and planned to rename the resort Holiday Lodge. Among the new group was Bud Ruppert, who owned other Holiday Lodge properties in Nevada and California. The new Holiday Lodge opened in 1963, with 100 newly constructed motel rooms and a casino, the latter eventually closing in September 1964.

Security National Bank of Nevada sued the Holiday Lodge lessees in 1965, alleging it was owed $30,000 on a promissory note. Subsequent legal troubles emerged between the lessees and the Yori family, which regained control of the resort in March 1966. They spent two months remodeling the Holiday Lodge before reopening it on June 10, 1966. Mark Yori said, "We've done a lot of remodeling and fixing to put it back to where it once was as an attraction for Reno families as well as for the tourists". Among the improvements was a new convention and banquet hall with capacity for 300 people. The golf course was also renovated. At the time, the hot springs included a health spa with three outdoor pools and nine indoor pools.

The Yori family sold the Holiday Lodge in 1970. It was renovated to become the Rodeway Inn and Holiday Spa, part of the Rodeway Inns hotel chain. In 1972, the property's name was changed to River Inn. An RV park was added a year later. During the mid-1970s, the River Inn hosted annual rafting races each Easter. In 1977, a judge ruled that the River Inn was not liable for the death of an intoxicated woman who drowned in one of the hot spring pools two years earlier.

During the 1970s, the resort was owned by a group of businessmen from Orange County, California, through companies known as Civic Center Enterprises and later Leisure Time Development. In 1977, the River Inn defaulted on a loan from Valley Bank of Nevada, which attempted to foreclose the property. At the time, gaming operations were handled by DGS, Inc., run by 1940s Boston Red Sox pitcher Emmett O'Neill. Leisure Time Development took over the resort later that year.

In January 1978, the Washoe County Commission ordered the River Inn to stop the spread of effluent water and spray from its sewer lagoons. The wastewater had been flowing for years into Reno's main water source, the Truckee River, posing a potential health risk. The resort began paying up to $500 daily to have the sewage hauled by tanker truck to a sewage treatment plant. As a result of these expenditures, the River Inn filed for Chapter 11 bankruptcy in March 1978. The resort owed more than $2 million to creditors.

The River Inn closed on December 15, 1978, at the ruling of a federal bankruptcy judge. Approximately 20 families were living at the RV park and were given several days to vacate the property. The MGM Grand resort and numerous locals offered assistance to the displaced families.

=== Revival attempts ===
In 1979, the River Inn was bought by developer George Benny, who then sold it to businessman T.M. Chang of California. Benny retained the resort through a leasehold agreement with Chang, who still owned the land beneath the resort. Benny planned to renovate and expand the resort. The revamped property would use a package sewer plant, although opponents argued that its leach fields would threaten their wells and the Truckee River. Benny's attorney assured property owners that they would be taken care of in the event of water contamination. Benny's plans were approved by the county in January 1980. He spent $6 million to renovate the resort, which he planned to rename as George Benny's River Palace. The resort's opening was scheduled for April 1981 but was delayed by the remodeling. Benny's additions included an A-frame casino structure and the foundation for a spa that was never built.

Benny faced legal problems in 1982, when he was accused of orchestrating a check-kiting scheme. Numerous liens were filed against the closed resort, and Benny was sentenced in 1984 to 30 years in prison. He had been found guilty of mail fraud and racketeering after he schemed lenders out of $40 million to finance his real estate projects.

California developer Jack Fleming offered to buy Benny's properties, including his leasehold interest in the River Inn. However, Fleming backed out of the deal in January 1984, following problems with his investment group. He returned with a new group at the end of the year, offering $3.5 million for the River Inn. Fleming planned to bring back the Yori family as operators, and they would also serve as financial partners. However, his second purchase attempt also failed to materialize.

Chang regained control of the resort in 1985. A year later, he announced plans to renovate the motel and finish the remaining facilities over a five-year period. In 1988, he announced new plans to demolish the existing 83 motel rooms and build new lodging accommodations, although he would retain the A-frame casino structure. The resort would be known as River Inn Hot Springs. The site's hot springs would be the primary attraction, with the casino as a secondary feature. Chang's plans were later put on hold due to poor economic conditions.

In 1991, the Reno City Council approved Chang's request for the property to be annexed into city limits, allowing the River Inn to acquire city sewer service. Chang hoped to have the first phase opened in 1992. The full project was expected to take 10 years to complete, at a cost of $50 million. It would be developed through Chang's company, Westlake Development. Construction did not begin as scheduled, and Chang later hoped to have the resort open by 1999, with various phases of construction continuing through 2013. These plans also did not come to fruition. In 2006, developer Blake Smith considered purchasing the closed resort. His plans would have included the demolition of the motel, to be replaced by condo hotel units. The closed resort was up for sale or lease in 2007 and has sometimes been used for SWAT training.

Chang died in 2017, at the age of 97. A year later, Westlake put the resort up for sale again. It occupies 24 acres, excluding another 11 acres leased from Union Pacific Railroad, which has long had a railroad track running across the front of the resort. It sold in December 2020 to Lawrence McNutt, owner of an information technology company in California. He had sought to relocate to Reno, where he was opening another branch of his company. McNutt and his girlfriend planned to make the River Inn their personal residence. They cleaned up the buildings, which had been subjected to vandalism over the years. McNutt said the buildings were still structurally sound, despite sitting un-used for decades. He suggested that community events could take place at the resort in the future.

Shortly after taking ownership, McNutt advertised camping on the site to gauge the public's interest in such a feature, although the city sent him a cease and desist order, noting that he lacked a business license. The city also advised him that he would have to pave the entire parking lot if he were to operate a camping business. The resort's location along the Truckee River also presented strict city codes relating to amenities such as sewer.
