= Edward J. Devitt U.S. Courthouse and Federal Building =

- United States Post Office and Courthouse
- U.S. National Register of Historic Places
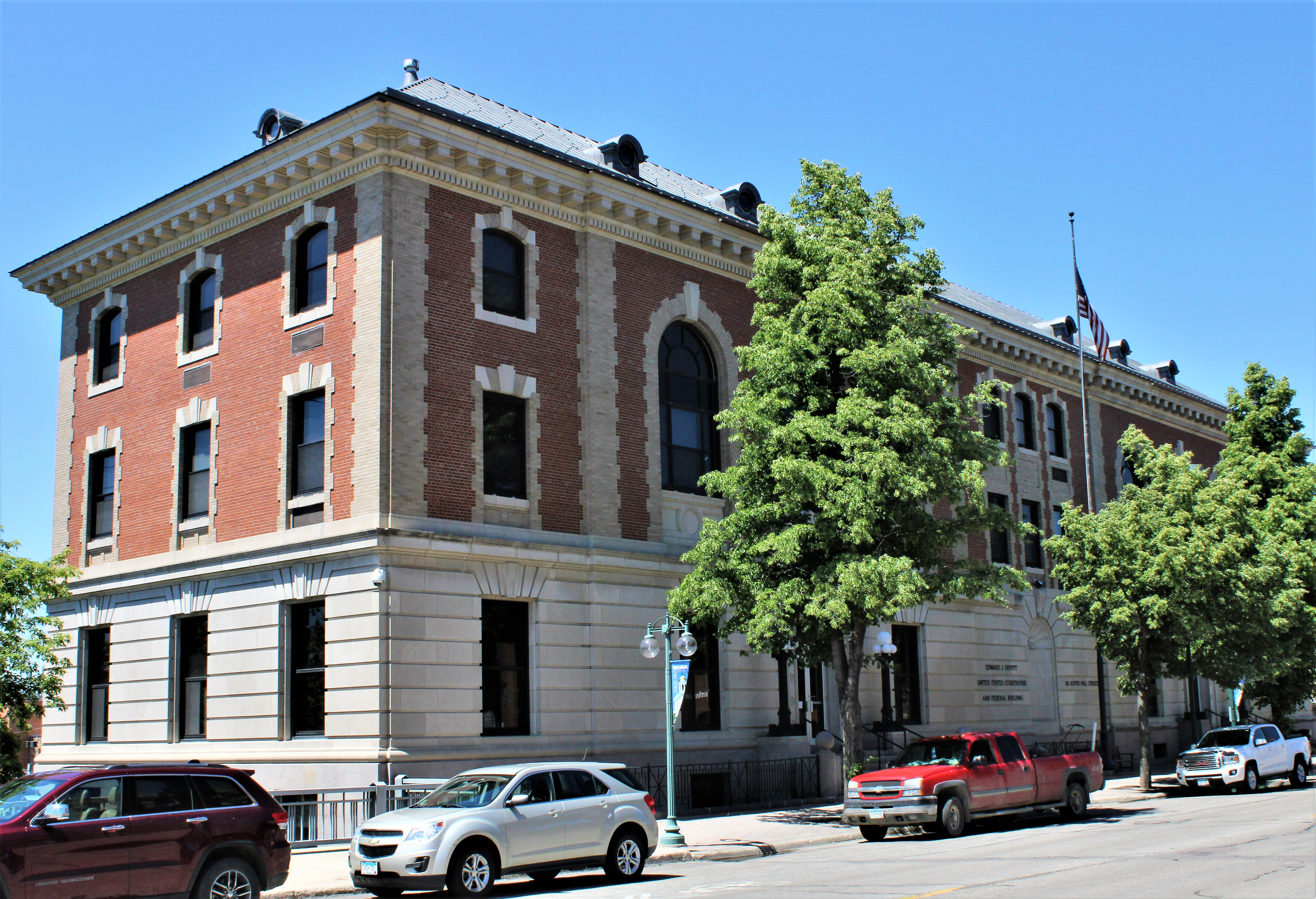

- Location within Minnesota Location within the United States
- Location: 118 S. Mill St. Fergus Falls, Minnesota
- Coordinates: 46°16′58″N 96°04′28″W
- Area: less than one acre
- Built: 1904
- Architect: James Knox Taylor
- Architectural style: Renaissance Revival
- NRHP reference No.: 12000879
- Added to NRHP: October 24, 2012

The Edward J. Devitt U.S. Courthouse and Federal Building is a historic post office and courthouse building located in Fergus Falls, Minnesota, United States. It is used as a courthouse for the United States District Court for the District of Minnesota. The building was designed by Supervising Architect of the United States Department of the Treasury James Knox Taylor. The three-story steel-frame structure was completed in 1904 in the Renaissance Revival style. The exterior is composed of granite, brick, and limestone. The interior lobby has a floor of marble and terrazzo. The building was expanded in 1927 and 1933, which nearly doubled its size. Because of poor hotel accommodations in Fergus Falls, the federal courthouse was almost relocated to Detroit Lakes in the late 1920s. The River Inn was completed across the street in 1929, and it provided accommodations for judges, jurors, lawyers, and court visitors for many years. The building was listed on the National Register of Historic Places in 2012. The following year it was named for Edward James Devitt, who served in the United States House of Representatives from 1947 to 1949, and as the Chief Judge of the U.S. District Court of Minnesota from 1959 to 1981.
