= Scambler Township, Otter Tail County, Minnesota =

Scambler Township, Minnesota
- Township
- Location of Scambler Township, within Otter Tail County, Minnesota

- Location within the state of Minnesota Scambler Township, Minnesota (the United States)
- Coordinates: 46°40′47″N 96°6′47″W
- Country: United States
- State: Minnesota
- County: Otter Tail

Area
  - Total: 36.3 sq mi (93.9 km^{2})
  - Land: 32.1 sq mi (83.2 km^{2})
  - Water: 4.2 sq mi (10.8 km^{2})
- Elevation: 1,401 ft (427 m)

Population (2020)
  - Total: 568
  - Density: 17.7/sq mi (6.83/km^{2})
- Time zone: UTC-6 (Central (CST))
  - Summer (DST): UTC-5 (CDT)
- ZIP code: 56572
- Area code: 218
- FIPS code: 27-58864
- GNIS feature ID: 0665563
- Website: https://scamblertownship.org/

Scambler Township is a township in Otter Tail County, Minnesota, United States. The population was 568 at the 2020 census.

Scambler Township was organized in 1871, and named for Robert Scambler, an early settler.

== Geography ==
According to the United States Census Bureau, the township has a total area of 36.3 square miles (93.9 km^{2}), of which 32.1 square miles (83.2 km^{2}) is land and 4.2 square miles (10.7 km^{2}) (11.44%) is water.

== Demographics ==
At the 2000 census there were 504 people, 208 households, and 154 families living in the township. The population density was 15.7 people per square mile (6.1/km^{2}). There were 552 housing units at an average density of 17.2/sq mi (6.6/km^{2}). The racial makeup of the township was 96.23% White, 2.38% Native American, and 1.39% from two or more races. Hispanic or Latino of any race were 0.60%.

Of the 208 households 28.8% had children under the age of 18 living with them, 65.4% were married couples living together, 5.8% had a female householder with no husband present, and 25.5% were non-families. 22.6% of households were one person and 9.1% were one person aged 65 or older. The average household size was 2.41 and the average family size was 2.77.

The age distribution was 22.4% under the age of 18, 5.6% from 18 to 24, 21.8% from 25 to 44, 32.1% from 45 to 64, and 18.1% 65 or older. The median age was 45 years. For every 100 females, there were 106.6 males. For every 100 females age 18 and over, there were 96.5 males.

The median household income was $40,625 and the median family income was $45,500. Males had a median income of $32,059 versus $21,667 for females. The per capita income for the township was $19,550. About 2.7% of families and 3.2% of the population were below the poverty line, including none of those under age 18 and 6.9% of those age 65 or over.
