= River Inn (Fergus Falls, Minnesota) =

- U.S. National Register of Historic Places
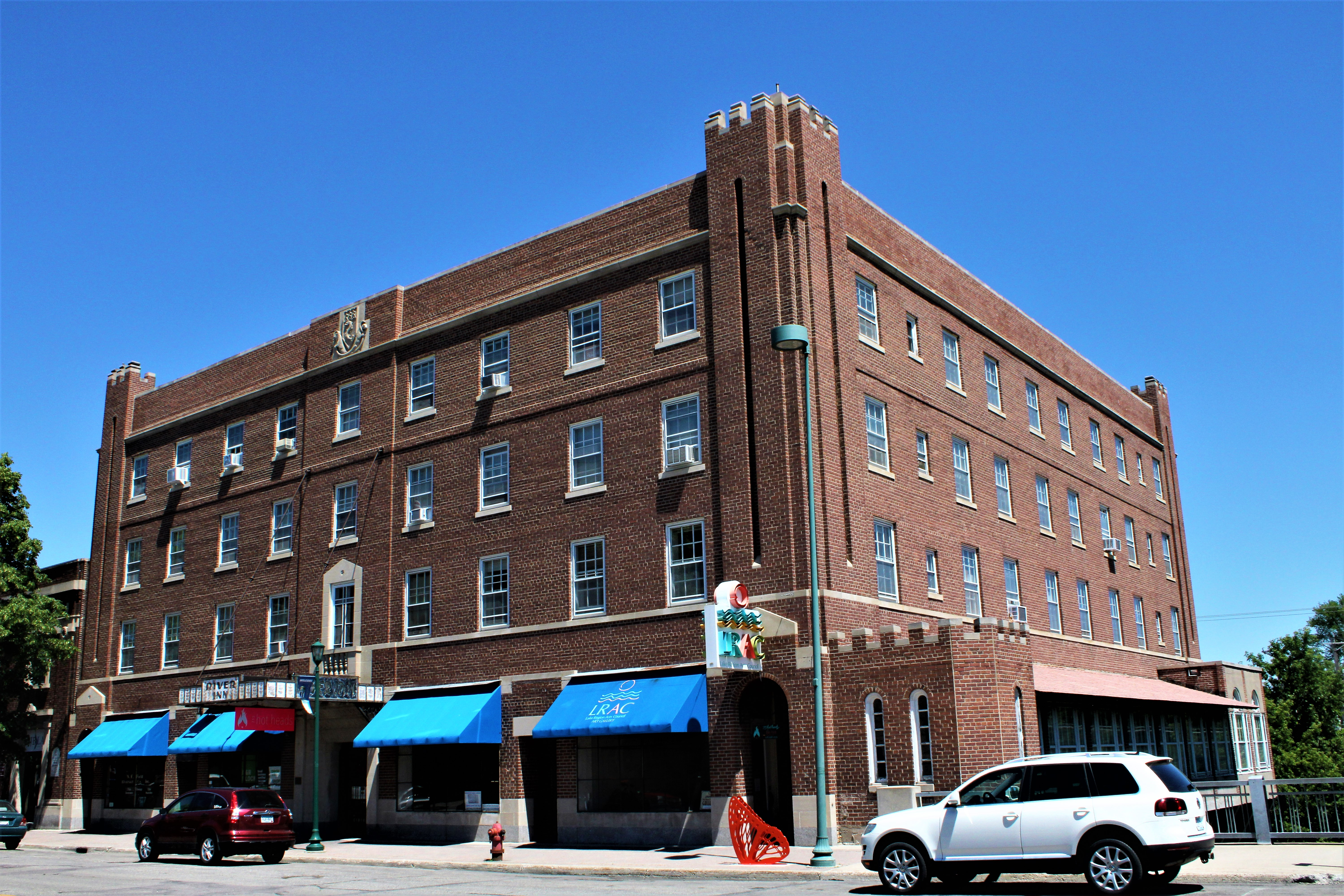

- Location within Minnesota Location within the United States
- Location: 133 Mill St., S. Fergus Falls, Minnesota
- Coordinates: 46°16′57″N 96°04′26″W
- Area: less than one acre
- Built: 1929
- Built by: Lauritzen Construction Co.
- Architect: Vernon A. Wright
- Architectural style: Tudor Revival
- NRHP reference No.: 88002831
- Added to NRHP: December 20, 1988

River Inn is a historic building located in Fergus Falls, Minnesota, United States. This was the third of three first-class hotels built in the central business district. Completed in 1929, it replaced the Hotel Kaddatz as the city's premier hotel. It also assured that the Federal Courthouse, located across the street, did not relocate to Detroit Lakes in the 1920s. The River Inn provided accommodations for judges, jurors, lawyers, and court visitors. Boston architect Vernon A. Wright developed the hotel and designed the building. His father was George B. Wright, one of the city's founders. Vernon Wright also co-founded the Otter Tail Power Company. The four-story brick structure with Indiana limestone trim, features elements of the Medieval Revival style, the only commercial building downtown in that style. It was built by the Lauritzen Construction Company. While owned by Wright until his death in 1938, the hotel was managed by the Roberts Hotel Chain of Winona, Minnesota. The building was extensively renovated after Al C. Kavli acquired the property in 1965, reducing the number of rooms from 96 to 15 and converting the rest into apartments. It was listed on the National Register of Historic Places in 1988.
