= Underwood, Minnesota =

City in Minnesota, United States

Underwood
- City
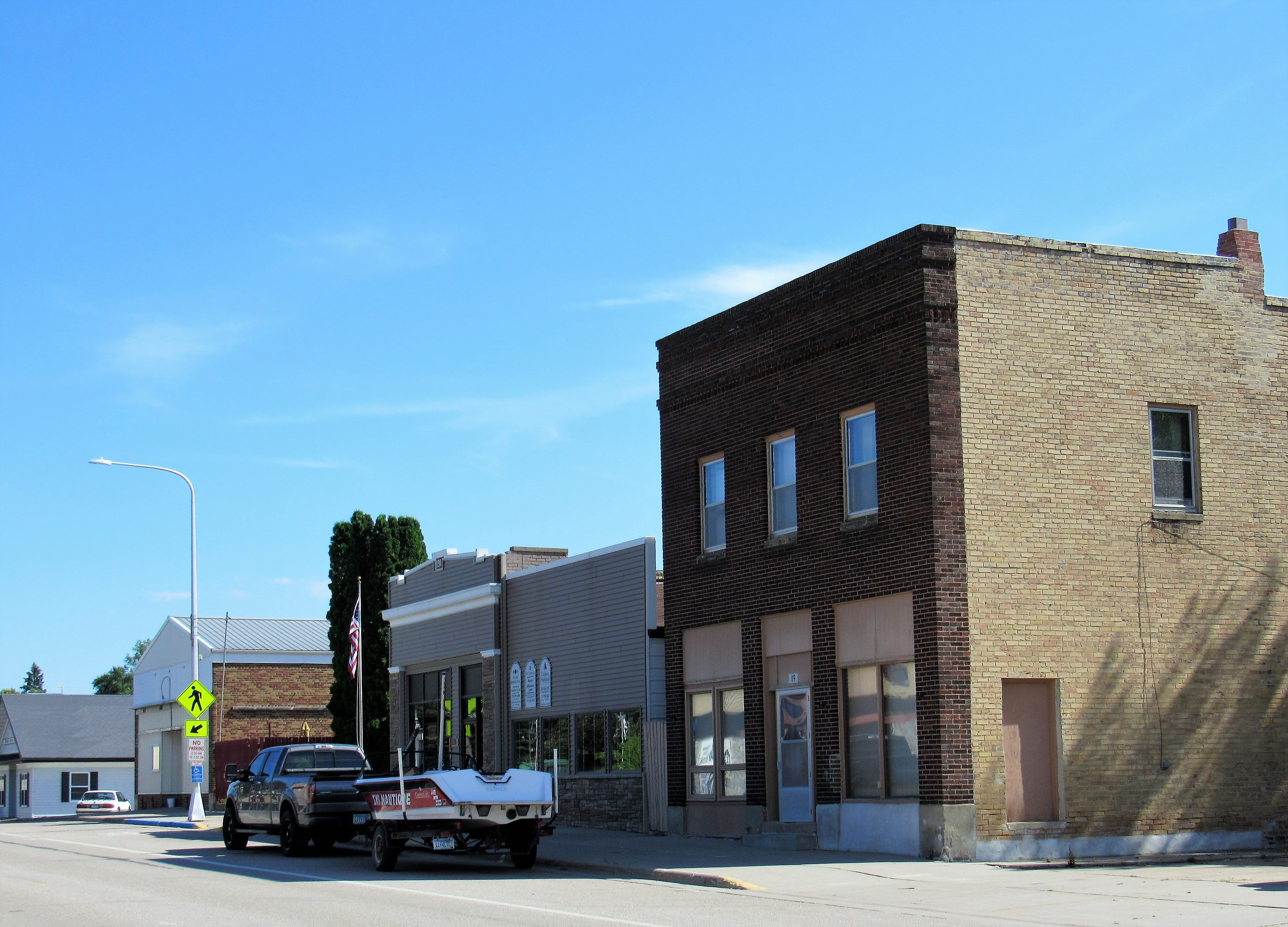

- Location of Underwood, Minnesota
- Coordinates: 46°17′13″N 95°52′20″W
- Country: United States
- State: Minnesota
- County: Otter Tail
- Founded: 1881
- Incorporated: 1912

Government
  - Mayor: Paul Hoff
  - City Council: Bert Kinzler, Marilyn Olson, Rick Jacobson, and Jim Erpelding

Area
  - Total: 0.59 sq mi (1.52 km^{2})
  - Land: 0.59 sq mi (1.52 km^{2})
  - Water: 0 sq mi (0.00 km^{2})
- Elevation: 1,342 ft (409 m)

Population (2020)
  - Total: 356
  - Estimate (2021): 363
  - Density: 607/sq mi (234.3/km^{2})
- Time zone: UTC-6 (CST)
  - Summer (DST): UTC-5 (CDT)
- ZIP code: 56586
- Area code: 218
- FIPS code: 27-66172
- GNIS feature ID: 2397082
- Website: cityofunderwood.com

Underwood is a city in Otter Tail County, Minnesota, United States. The population was 356 at the 2020 census.

== History ==
Underwood was platted in 1881, and named for Adoniram Judson Underwood, a politician and editor of the Weekly Journal, a Fergus Falls-based newspaper. A post office has been in operation at Underwood since 1884. Underwood was incorporated in 1912.

== Geography ==
According to the United States Census Bureau, the city has a total area of 0.58 square miles (1.50 km^{2}), all land.

Underwood is located between Fergus Falls and Battle Lake on Minnesota State Highway 210.

== Demographics ==
Historical population
Census	Pop.	Note	%±
1920	258		—
1930	308		19.4%
1940	353		14.6%
1950	336		−4.8%
1960	314		−6.5%
1970	278		−11.5%
1980	332		19.4%
1990	284		−14.5%
2000	319		12.3%
2010	341		6.9%
2020	356		4.4%
2021 (est.)	363		2.0%
U.S. Decennial Census; 2020 Census

=== 2010 census ===
As of the census of 2010, there were 341 people, 159 households, and 104 families living in the city. The population density was 587.9 inhabitants per square mile (227.0/km^{2}). There were 180 housing units at an average density of 310.3 per square mile (119.8/km^{2}). The racial makeup of the city was 99.4% White, 0.3% African American, and 0.3% from two or more races. Hispanic or Latino of any race were 0.6% of the population.

There were 159 households, of which 23.9% had children under the age of 18 living with them, 52.2% were married couples living together, 8.2% had a female householder with no husband present, 5.0% had a male householder with no wife present, and 34.6% were non-families. 32.1% of all households were made up of individuals, and 15.1% had someone living alone who was 65 years of age or older. The average household size was 2.14 and the average family size was 2.67.

The median age in the city was 46.8 years. 20.8% of residents were under the age of 18; 5.5% were between the ages of 18 and 24; 20.8% were from 25 to 44; 28.5% were from 45 to 64; and 24.3% were 65 years of age or older. The gender makeup of the city was 50.7% male and 49.3% female.

=== 2000 census ===
As of the census of 2000, there were 319 people, 142 households, and 95 families living in the city. The population density was 752.3 inhabitants per square mile (290.5/km^{2}). There were 154 housing units at an average density of 363.2 per square mile (140.2/km^{2}). The racial makeup of the city was 99.06% White, 0.31% Asian, and 0.63% from two or more races. Hispanic or Latino of any race were 0.63% of the population.

There were 142 households, out of which 28.2% had children under the age of 18 living with them, 55.6% were married couples living together, 9.9% had a female householder with no husband present, and 32.4% were non-families. 30.3% of all households were made up of individuals, and 20.4% had someone living alone who was 65 years of age or older. The average household size was 2.25 and the average family size was 2.74.

In the city, the population was spread out, with 23.2% under the age of 18, 8.8% from 18 to 24, 21.3% from 25 to 44, 20.1% from 45 to 64, and 26.6% who were 65 years of age or older. The median age was 40 years. For every 100 females, there were 87.6 males. For every 100 females age 18 and over, there were 84.2 males.

The median income for a household in the city was $29,000, and the median income for a family was $34,375. Males had a median income of $28,438 versus $21,875 for females. The per capita income for the city was $19,465. About 10.5% of families and 14.2% of the population were below the poverty line, including 11.5% of those under age 18 and 22.9% of those age 65 or over.

== Education ==
Underwood is home to a single-campus primary and secondary school. In 2007 Underwood School District 550 was named one of the top 100 schools in the United States. The school team is the Rockets and its colors are black and orange.
