= 1919 Fergus Falls tornado =

1919 tornado in Minnesota, U.S.

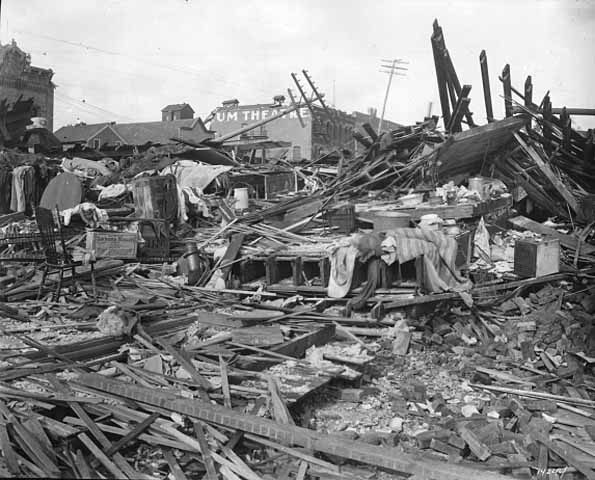
- Destruction from the Fergus Falls Tornado

Meteorological history
- Formed: June 22, 1919 , 4:46 p.m. CST (UTC−06:00)
- Dissipated: June 22, 1919 , 5:01 p.m. CST (UTC−06:00)
- Duration: 15 minutes

F5 equiv. tornado
- Highest winds: >300 mph (480 km/h)

Overall effects
- Fatalities: 57
- Damage: $4 million ($74,280,000 in 2025)
- Areas affected: Central Minnesota

The 1919 Fergus Falls tornado was a large and destructive tornado that struck Fergus Falls, Minnesota on Sunday, June 22, 1919. It killed 57 people and is the second deadliest tornado in Minnesota's history (1st was the 1886 Sauk Rapids tornado). This tornado occurred just 10 months after a tornado in Tyler, Minnesota killed 36 people, Minnesota's fourth deadliest tornado on record.

== The tornado ==
The tornado had a path of 20 miles (32 km), and at times was 400 yards (366 m) wide. It hit Fergus Falls at approximately 4:46 pm, and according to witness accounts was a "blank funnel shaped twisting cloud, or possibly several of them". Though the Fujita scale did not exist at that time, it is estimated to have been an F5 based on descriptions and photographs of the damage.

== Damage ==
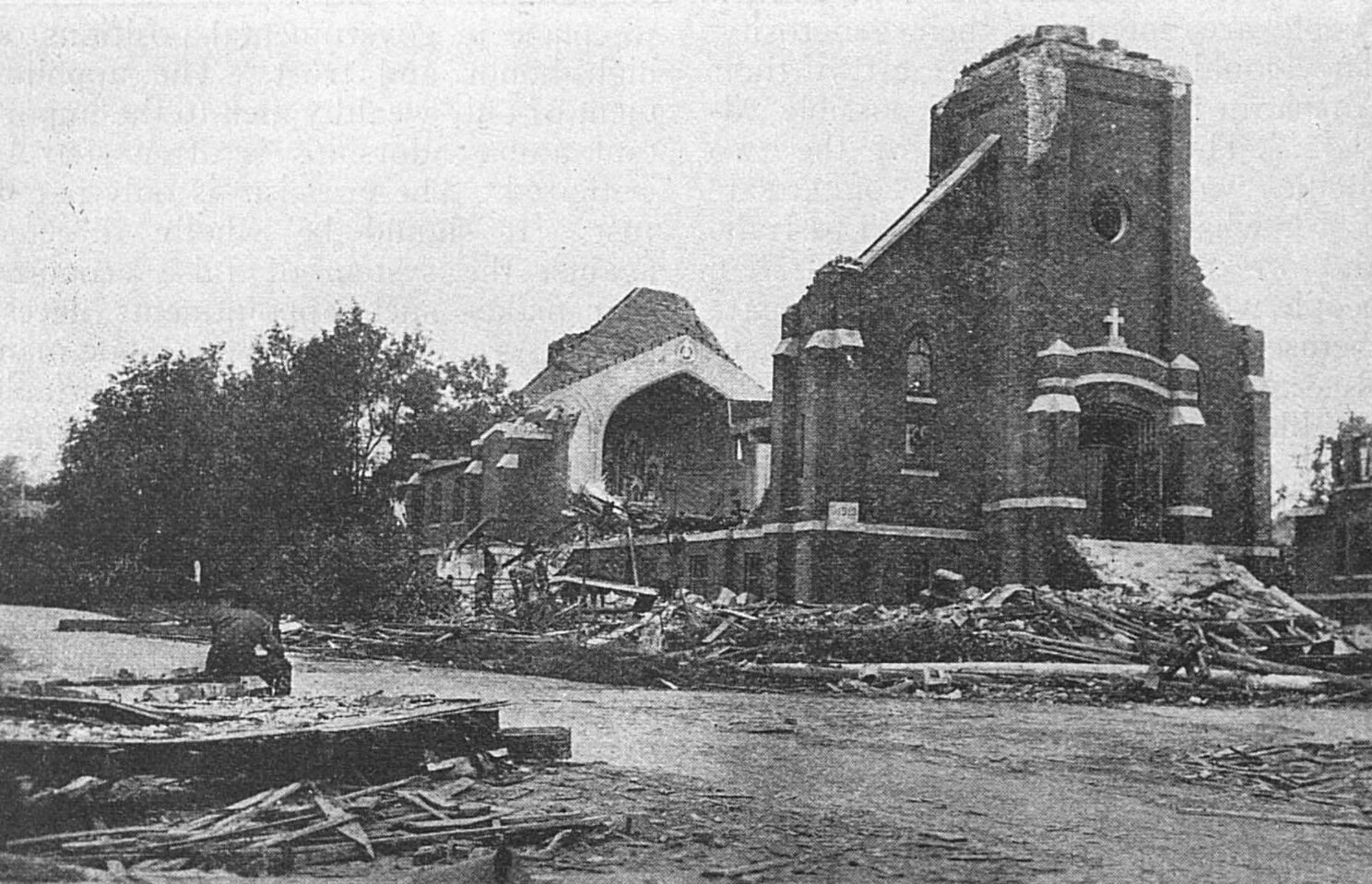
Ruins of Our Lady of Victories church, 1919

The tornado tore through the northern part of town, leveling 44 city blocks (including the business district), destroying 159 homes and damaging 250 more, some of which were swept completely away. Of the 57 people who died, at least 35 of them were in the Grand Hotel, a three-story, 100 room hotel which was completely flattened. Two hundred more were injured. The tornado also destroyed the Otter Tail County courthouse, the county jail, four churches and multiple other businesses. Small trees in town were debarked, and railroad tracks were reportedly pulled from the ground at one location, indicative of high intensity. The Northern Pacific rail depot was completely destroyed, and reportedly swept away. At Lake Alice, several summer homes were swept into the water along with their occupants, resulting in several fatalities there. The Great Northern Oriental Limited passenger train was thrown off the tracks by the tornado, but none of the 250 passengers on the train were seriously injured. Checks that were sucked up by the tornado in Fergus Falls were found 60 miles to the east.

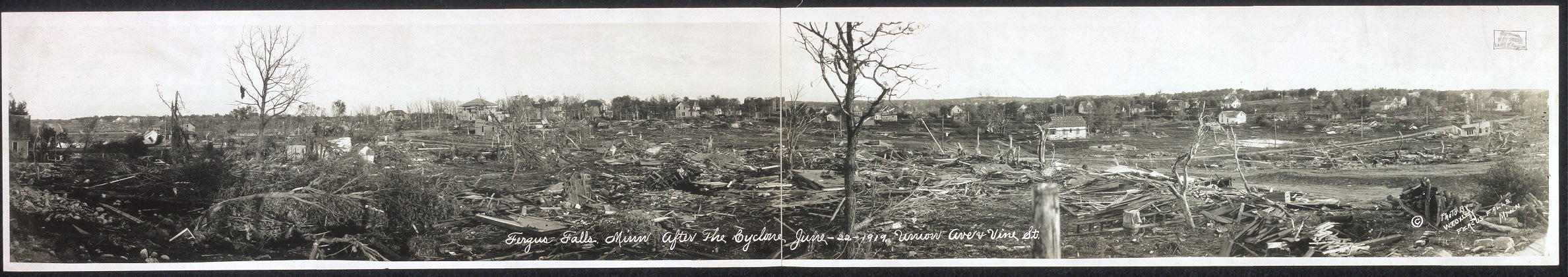

== See also ==
- 1918 Tyler tornado
- 1886 Sauk Rapids tornado
- Climate of Minnesota
- List of F5 and EF5 tornadoes
- List of tornadoes causing 100 or more deaths
