= Northwestern College (Fergus Falls, Minnesota) =

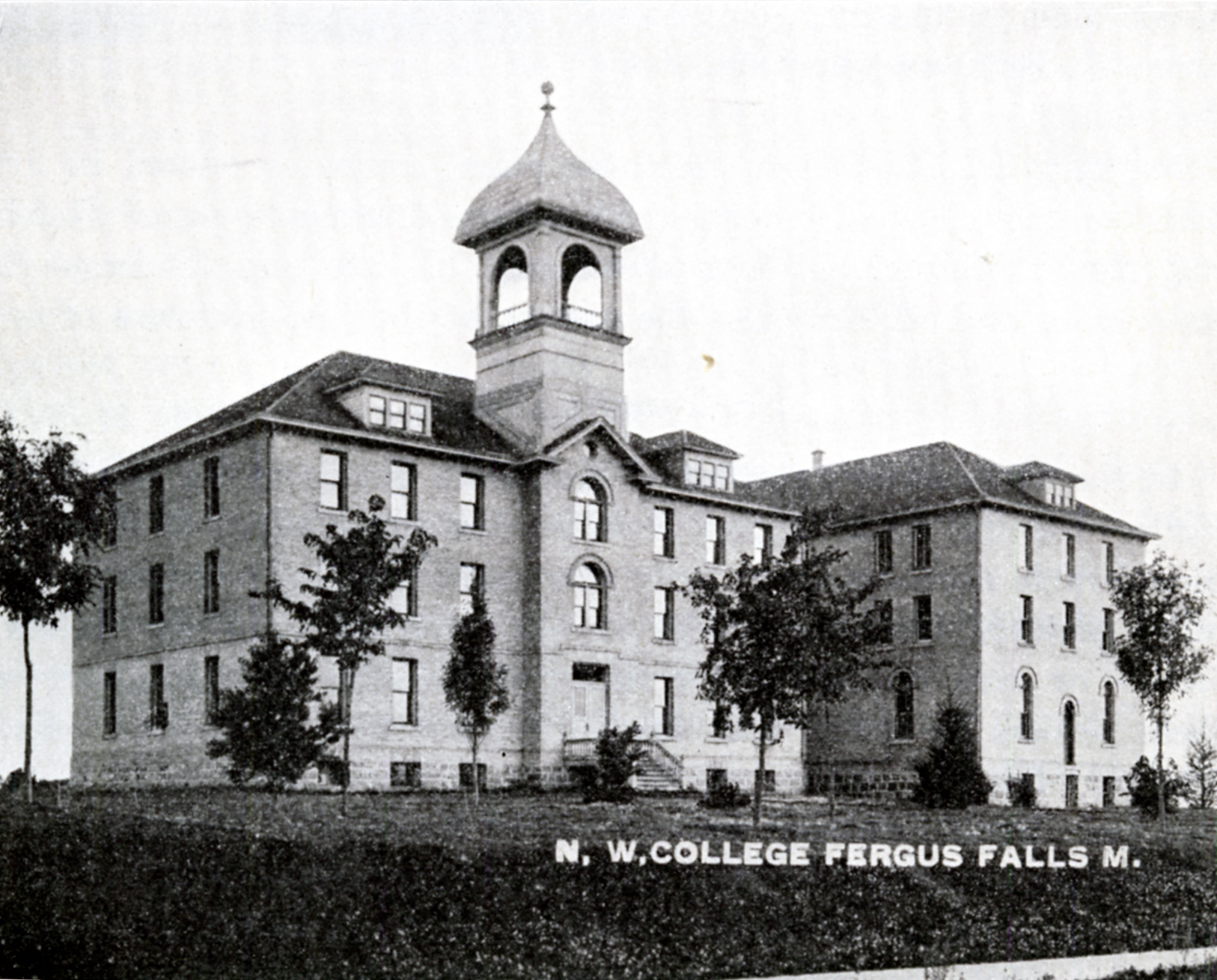
Northwestern College in Fergus Falls, Minnesota

Northwestern College was a secondary school that existed from 1900 to 1932 in Fergus Falls, Minnesota. The school was built based on a need for a local academy for Scandinavian immigrant children within the greater area. It offered Academic, Normal, Preparatory, Commerce, Music, and Art departments of study, and was funded by the Northwestern College Corporation of the Minnesota Conference (Red River Valley Conference after it was formed in 1912) of the Augustana Synod.

Northwestern was one of four small "colleges" (although more like high schools) affiliated with the Augustana Synod in the late 1800s and early 1900s, along with Hope Academy, Minnesota College, and North Star College. These schools aided Scandinavian immigrants with assimilating into American culture. Over 500 students graduated from the school out of the 1500 that had attended, and many students went on to enroll at Gustavus Adolphus College after attending Northwestern. About one fifth of the Academy department graduates entered the Christian ministry.

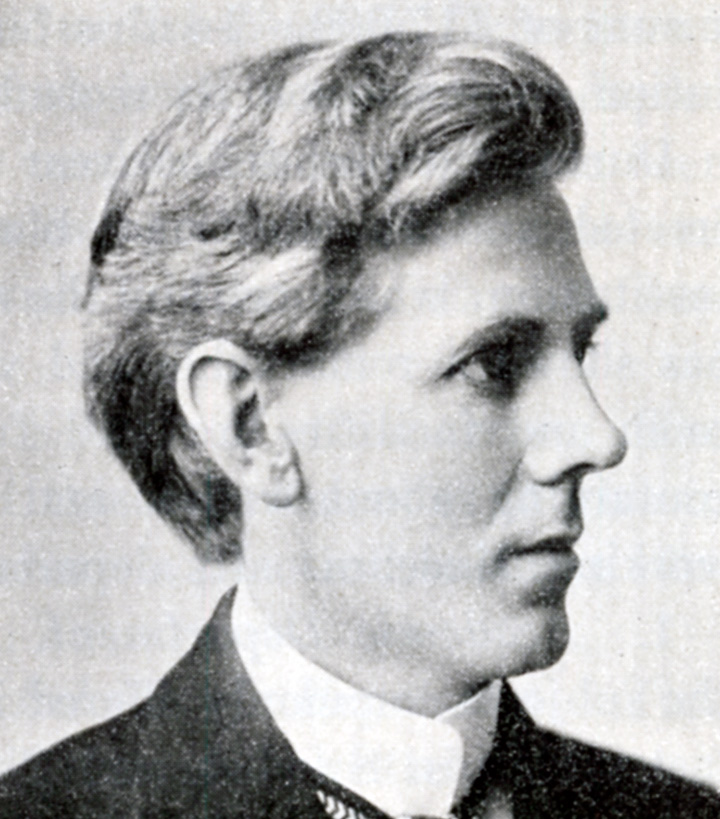
A.C. Youngdahl was the school's first president from 1901 to 1910.

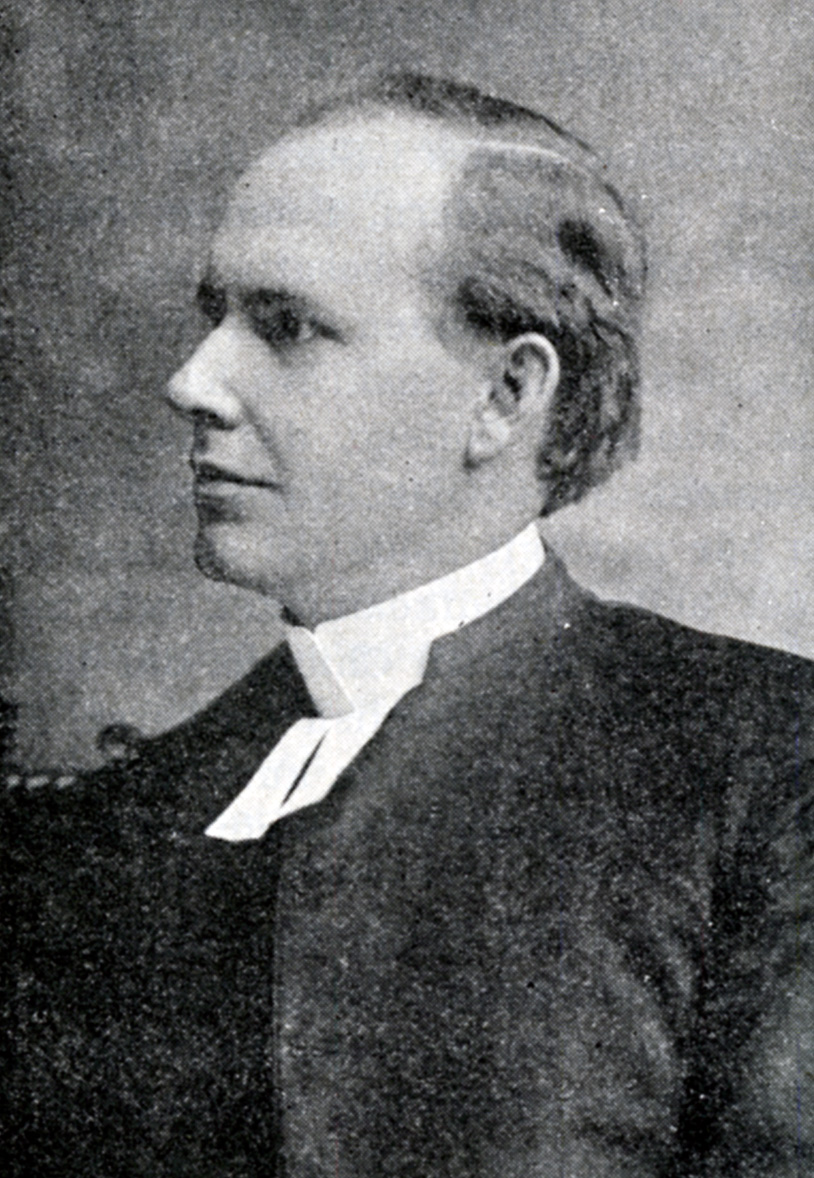
Rev. Carl Solomonson was president of Northwestern from 1915 to 1919.

== History ==
Northwestern's academic requirements were recognized by the University of Minnesota and students could enter that university without entrance exams after graduating. Each dormitory at Northwestern had a student council, and staff supervised students' studies in the evening. All students were expected to "conduct themselves as Christian young ladies and gentlemen at all times." Although Northwestern did not enroll many students (178 students in 1907 was the highest number), students kept active. They participated in two literary societies, Aurora and the Tegnerförbundet, the latter being directed in Swedish. The students also participated in prayer circles, the chorus, band, orchestra, Mission Study Class, Gladstone debating society, Glee Club, the Athletic Association, and the Handel Oratorio Society. Since Northwestern did not have a gymnasium and no requirements for physical fitness, students rented the gymnasium of a local high school once a week. Students practiced basketball, sometimes had two baseball teams, and played tennis on the school's two tennis courts.

The school was closed for two weeks during an influenza epidemic in 1918. In 1919, a tornado damaged the school, and a fire caused another closing of the campus for two weeks in 1924. Northwestern struggled with debt the majority of its operation. The school did not generate enough funding from tuition and other resources to run the $40,000 property. The conference held three meetings to clear the school's debt: $20,000 was raised in 1915 and $5,000 was raised in 1924 and 1925. In years with low enrollment, some classes were only offered every other year. One year, students had to perform janitorial duties themselves.

Despite donations, including $6,000 from railroad executive James J. Hill, debt eventually led to the school's closure when the conference cut off aid from the North Star Corporation of the Augustana Synod, and the Northwestern Corporation was forced to close the school. All debts were paid off, and Northwestern's campus was sold in the 1940s for $12,500. Proceeds from the sale benefited conference charities, and a Lutheran Bible school continued education in the place of Northwestern. Later, the former Northwestern College campus became part of Lutheran Brethren Seminary (an institution of the Church of the Lutheran Brethren of America) and housed the institution's Seminary and Bible School departments.
