= Van Santen =

Van Santen is a Dutch toponymic surname meaning "from/of Xanten" (locally and in Dutch spelled Santen). An alternative origin may be in Saintes (once known as "Zanten" in Dutch), a town just across the language border in Walloon Brabant. People with the surname include:

- Dominika van Santen (born 1983), Venezuelan model and actress
- Gerrit van Santen (1591/92–1656), Dutch painter and writer
- Jan van Santen (c.1550–1621), Dutch architect, garden designer and engraver active in Italy
- Johannes van Santen (1772–1858), Old Catholic Archbishop of Utrecht
- Peter Van Santen (1931–2011), American farmer and politician
- Pieter van Santen, Dutch merchant, Opperhoofd in Japan in 1633
- Rutger van Santen (born 1945), Dutch chemist, Spinoza Prize winner
- Shantel VanSanten (born 1985), American model and actress

== See also ==
- Van Zanten
- von Santen
