= Lutheran Brethren Seminary =

Coordinates: 46.276680°N 96.090188°W

- Fergus Falls, Minnesota; U.S.

Information
- Type: Theological Seminary
- Established: 1903
- President: Dr. Troy T. Tysdal
- Faculty: 3 full-time & 3 part-time
- Enrollment: 40 (2016)
- Website: Official Website

Lutheran Brethren Seminary (LBS) is an institute of theological higher education of the Church of the Lutheran Brethren of America (CLBA), located in Fergus Falls, Minnesota. It shares its campus with the denominational headquarters of the CLBA and the denomination’s high school, Hillcrest Lutheran Academy. The seminary’s primary mission is to train and equip pastors, missionaries, and Christian lay workers for ministry in the Church of the Lutheran Brethren and other church bodies.

== History ==
The academic institution that would become known as Lutheran Brethren Seminary was founded in Wahpeton, North Dakota, in 1903 as “Lutheran Bible School.” It began as an institute for the training of Lutheran Brethren pastors and young laypeople wishing to receive a solid Biblical education. The pastor’s training course would eventually become the Seminary department, and the lay Bible course would become the Bible School department. In 1916, a four-year high school department was added to Lutheran Bible School.

The school was first relocated in 1918 to Grand Forks, North Dakota, and then again to Fergus Falls, Minnesota, in 1935, on the campus of the former Park Region Luther College. In 1946, the Seminary and Bible School departments moved across town to the former Northwestern College campus in Fergus Falls, leaving the high school to remain by itself on the Park Region campus. The school system was renamed “Lutheran Brethren Schools” in 1948, and the high school became known as “Hillcrest Lutheran Academy.” In 1956, after ten years on a separate campus, the Seminary and Bible School returned to the old Park Region campus, reuniting with Hillcrest.

With increased enrollment in all three departments of the school, it became necessary to implement a building program on the campus. In 1968, Sletta-Strom Memorial Hall was erected as a new dormitory for Bible School and Seminary students. The Broen Media Center was completed in 1975, housed Lutheran Brethren Seminary, with four classrooms, a library, and faculty offices. Also by 1975, the Bible School had become known as Lutheran Brethren Junior Bible College, offering an Associate of Arts degree in Bible.

The 1980s saw a rapid decline in enrollment in the Bible College, which eventually shrunk into a one-year Bible program known as “Alpha Way.” In 1992, the name of the Bible College was changed to the “Lutheran Center for Christian Learning” (LCCL). A major change for the schools occurred in 2003, when it was decided to split Hillcrest Lutheran Academy from Lutheran Brethren Schools and incorporate it as a separate school with its own president and board, while still remaining within the Church of the Lutheran Brethren. In 2004, the Lutheran Center for Christian Learning (LCCL) ceased to exist as a separate entity, and its program became part of the seminary curriculum as an extension service.

In 2012, Lutheran Brethren Seminary was awarded Accredited status through the Transnational Association of Christian Colleges and Schools (TRACS) as a Category III institution. In 2013, the TRACS Accreditation Commission approved the seminary’s substantive change request to offer its accredited programs via distance learning technology. In 2015, the seminary building was given to Hillcrest, which was renovated to the new Student Union, and the seminary moved across the street to a new addition attached to The Church of the Lutheran Brethren of America synod offices.

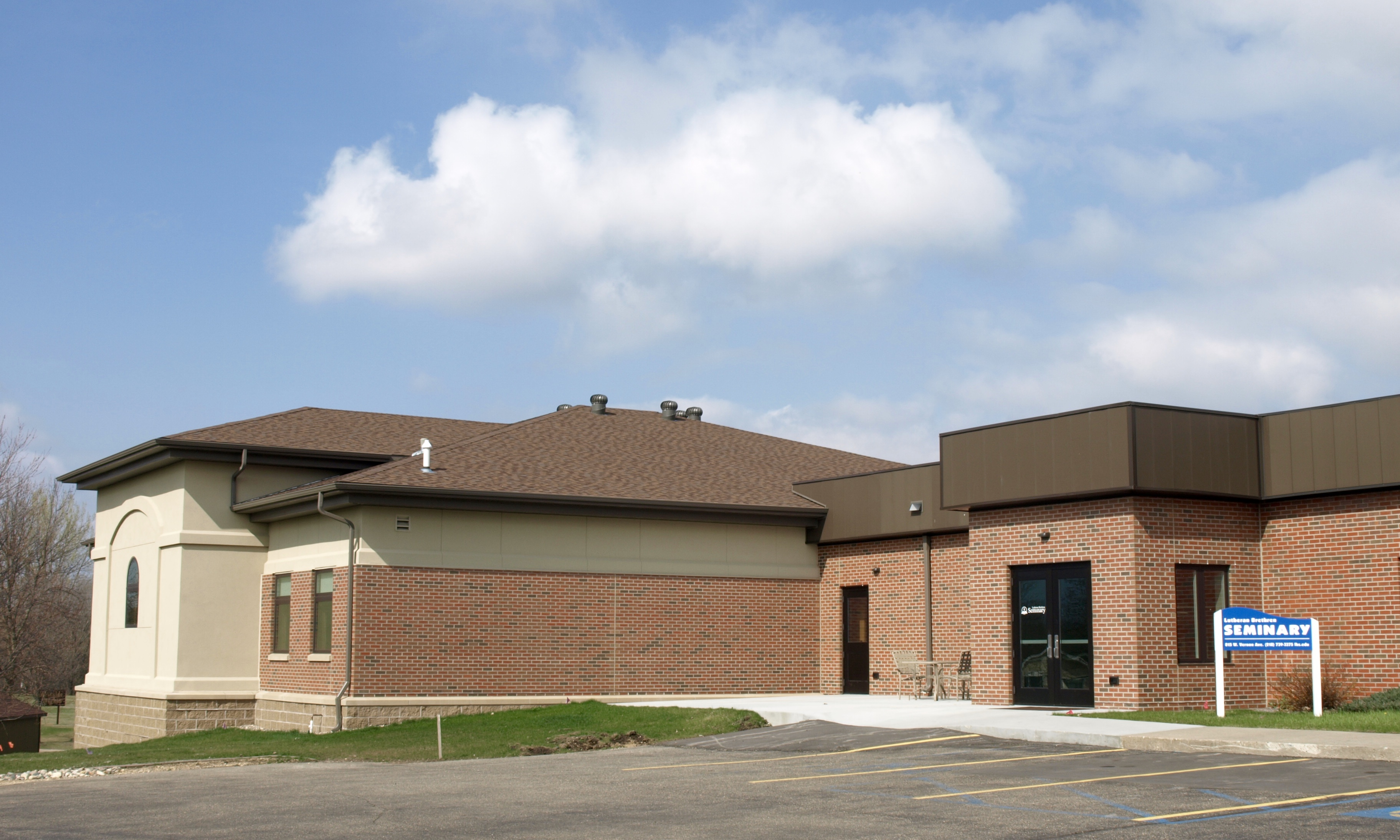
Lutheran Brethren Seminary Front Entrance

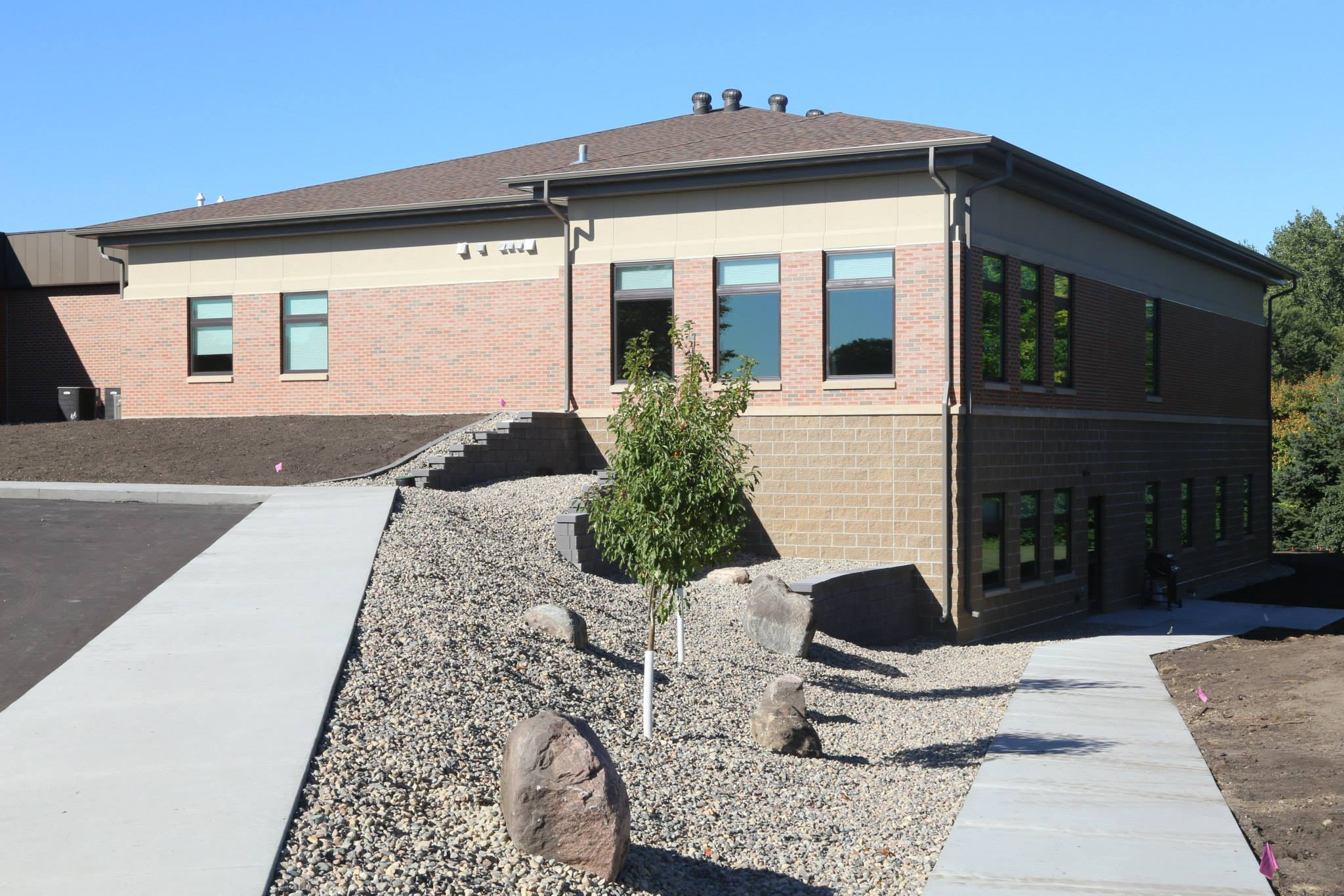
Lutheran Brethren Seminary Back View

=== Presidents of LBS ===
Name	Term
E. M. Broen	1903–1911
Lars Lillehei	1911–1914
E. M. Broen	1914–1926
S. L. Klyve	1926–1931
E. M. Broen	1931–1938
E. M. Strom	1938–1949
S. L. Klyve	1949–1950
A. A. Pedersen	1950–1955
E. M. Strom	1955–1956
M. E. Sletta	1956–1957
J. H. Levang	1957–1972
C. L. Bjornlie	1972–1984
Omar N. Gjerness	1984–1990
Joel Egge	1990–2001
Joel Nordtvedt	2003–2006
David Veum	2006–2023
Troy T. Tysdal	2023-Present

== Academic programs ==
- Master of Divinity (M.Div.)
- Master of Theological Studies (M.T.S.)
- Diploma in Christian Ministry
- Certificate of Theological Studies
  - Lay Ministry
  - Bible and Theology
  - Missions
  - Youth Ministry
