= Willard Munger =

American politician (1911–1999)

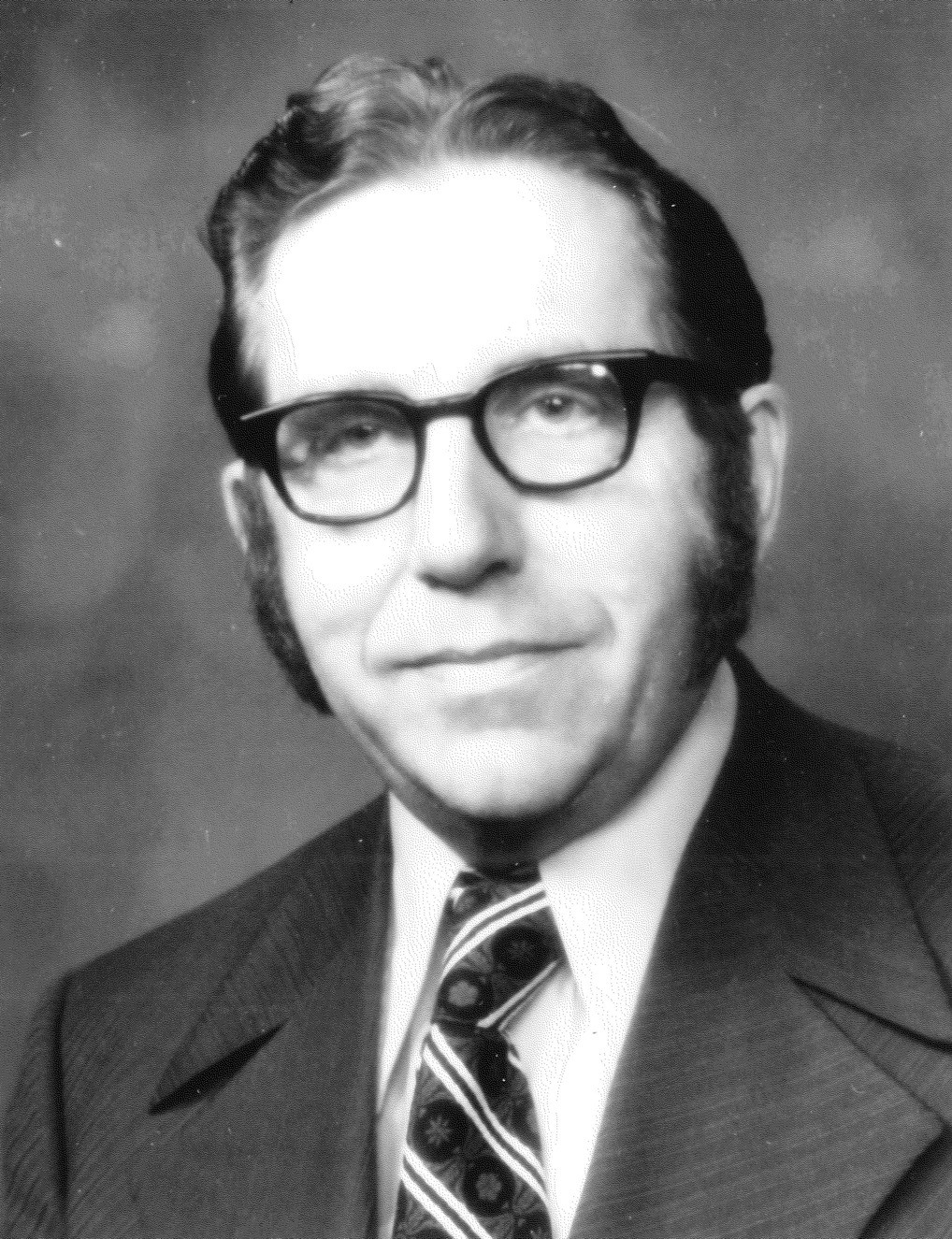
- Munger c. 1973

Member of the Minnesota House of Representatives from the 59, 59B, 7A district
- In office January 2, 1967 – July 11, 1999
- In office January 3, 1955 – January 3, 1965

Personal details
- Born: January 20, 1911 Fergus Falls, Minnesota, U.S.
- Died: July 11, 1999 (aged 88) Duluth, Minnesota, U.S.
- Party: Democratic–Farmer–Labor
- Other political affiliations: Nonpartisan League (c. 1930s); Farmer–Labor (c. 1930s)
- Spouse(s): Martha Winter; Frances Hotch
- Children: 2
- Education: University of Minnesota
- Occupation: Business owner, legislator

Willard M. Munger (January 20, 1911 – July 11, 1999) was a Minnesota politician and a member of the Minnesota House of Representatives from northeastern Minnesota. First elected in 1954, he was re-elected to four more terms before running for the Minnesota Senate in 1964. Unsuccessful in that bid, he ran for the House again in 1966, and was re-elected every two years until his death in 1999. He holds the record as the longest-serving member of the House at over 42 years and seven months.

== Early years and political interest ==
Munger was born in Fergus Falls and attended Fergus Falls High School, graduating in 1932. While still in high school, he supported the openly socialist Nonpartisan League. Nonpartisan League founder Arthur C. Townley became a close friend. He also campaigned for Farmer-Laborer Governor Floyd B. Olson, a confessed radical who had Nonpartisan League roots. He attended the University of Minnesota and settled in Duluth, where he was a motel owner and operator for many years.

Before serving in the legislature, Munger worked with the marketing division of the Minnesota Department of Agriculture, and with grain inspection for the Minnesota Railroad and Warehouse Commission. He was unsuccessful in his first bid for office in 1934 when he ran for the state House on the Farmer-Laborer party ticket. Later, he was active in the establishment and development of the Lake Superior Zoo.

== Legislative and environmental leadership ==
As a Democrat, Munger represented the old districts 59, 59B and 7A in the House, with the district boundaries and numeration changing somewhat through redistricting every ten years. As the legislature was officially non-partisan until the 1974 elections, he caucused with the Liberal Caucus until declaration of party affiliation became a prerequisite for candidacy. His district included portions of St. Louis County, primarily centered around the western part of the city of Duluth.

Over time, Munger came to be known as Minnesota's "Mr. Environment". He earned a reputation as a pioneer, leader and activist in environmental legislation. He chaired the House Environment and Natural Resources Committee from 1973 until his death, excepting a brief interlude when Republicans controlled the House. His most noted legislative accomplishments included the passage of the Acid Deposition Control Act (1982), Environment and Natural Resources Trust Fund Act, the Solid Waste Reduction and Recycling Act of 1989, the Reinvest in Minnesota (RIM) Program, the Groundwater Protection Act of 1989, the Toxic Pollution Prevention Act, and the Wetlands Conservation Act of 1991. He also led the effort to establish the Energy Task Force to Develop Alternative Energy Resource, helped secure millions of state and federal dollars to clean up the St. Louis River, and led campaigns to fund research into frog deformities and to ban the use of DDT insecticide.

Besides chairing the House Environment and Natural Resources Committee, Munger also chaired the Penal Institutions Committee during the 1959–1960 legislative biennium, and the Elections Committee during the 1961–1962 biennium. Through the years, he was a member of the Appropriations, the Capital Investment, the Energy and Utilities, the General Legislation, Veterans Affairs and Elections, the Metropolitan and Urban Affairs, the Rules and Legislative Administration, and the Ways and Means committees, and of various committee incarnations and subcommittees relevant to each.

== Death and legacy ==
Munger died of liver cancer on July 11, 1999. At the time of his death, he was also the oldest legislator in Minnesota history. The Willard Munger State Trail is named in his honor. The Willard Munger Inn was founded by him in 1954 and is now run by his grandson, Jeff. A 2009 book, Mr. Environment: the Willard Munger Story, details his life and legacy.
