= Van Zanten =

Van Zanten is a Dutch toponymic surname meaning "from/of Xanten" (locally and in Dutch spelled Santen). An alternative origin may be in Saintes (once known as "Zanten" in Dutch), a town just across the language border in Walloon Brabant. People with the surname include:

- Claudia van Zanten (born 1979), Dutch politician
- Cornélie van Zanten (1855–1946), Dutch opera singer, singing teacher and author
- David van Zanten (born 1982), Irish football defender
- Ek van Zanten (born 1933), Dutch sculptor and draftsman
- Frank van Zanten (born 1967), Dutch businessman
- Henri van Zanten (1957–2020), Dutch artist, actor and director
- Jacob Veldhuyzen van Zanten (1927–1977), Dutch senior pilot and flight instructor with KLM Royal Dutch Airlines. He was killed on March 27, 1977, in what would become known as the Tenerife airport disaster, the deadliest accident in the history of aviation to date

== See also ==
- Van Santen, Dutch surname of the same origin
- von Santen / Zanten, aristocratic German family name
- Veldhuyzen van Zanten, Dutch family name, most notably of the KLM airline pilot (1927–1977)
- Jan Luiten van Zanden (born 1955), Dutch economic historian
