= Mohr v. Williams =

Decision of the Minnesota Supreme Court

- Court: Minnesota Supreme Court
- Decided: 1905
- Citation: 95 Minn. 261, 104 N.W. 12, 108 N.W. 818

Case history
- Subsequent action: none

Holding
- If an operation is performed on a patient without that patient's consent, and the circumstances were not such as to justify its performance without consent, that operation constitutes an assault and battery

Court membership
- Chief judge: Charles M. Start
- Associate judges: Calvin Brown, Charles Lundy Lewis, Charles B. Elliott

Case opinions
- Majority: Brown, joined by unanimous

Mohr v. Williams, 104 N.W. 12 (Minn. 1905) is a decision of the Minnesota Supreme Court authored by Calvin L. Brown. For almost a century, this case has been used in first-year Torts classes in American law schools to teach students about informed consent.

== Background ==
Dr. Williams was a physician and surgeon, practicing in Saint Paul, Minnesota and specializing in disorders of the ear. Mrs. Mohr was a patient who came to Dr. Williams complaining of trouble with her right ear. Dr. Williams examined her right ear and he discovered that there was a large perforation in the eardrum, that there was a large polyp in the middle ear, and that the ossicles of the middle ear were probably diseased. Dr. Williams also examined Mrs. Mohr's left ear, but he was unable to make a full examination because of a foreign substance in the left ear.

On Dr. Williams' recommendation, Mrs. Mohr agreed to have surgery on her right ear to remove the polyp and diseased ossicles. Anesthetics were used during the operation. After the patient was unconscious, Dr. Williams made a full examination of Mrs. Mohr's left ear and discovered that it was in a worse state than her right ear: there was a small perforation high up in the drum membrane, hooded and with rough edges, and the bone of the inner wall of the middle ear was diseased and dead. Dr. Williams also examined the right ear and found that it was not in as bad a condition as he had anticipated. He therefore decided to operate on the left ear instead of the right, performing an ossiculectomy, removing a part of the drum membrane and scraping away the diseased portion of the inner ear.

Mrs. Mohr later brought suit against Dr. Williams, claiming that he had damaged her hearing and seriously injured her person, and that, because she had not consented to surgery on her left ear, his actions were wrongful and unlawful and constituted an assault and battery. Mrs. Mohr asked the court to award her $20,000 in damages. A trial was held in the district court for Ramsey County, Minnesota and the jury found for Mrs. Mohr and awarded her $14,322.50 in damages. The trial judge set aside the jury's verdict as excessive. Both parties appealed.

On appeal, Mrs. Mohr's lawyers, H. A. Loughran and S. C. Olmstead, argued that Mrs. Mohr's consent was necessary and without consent, Dr. Williams' actions constituted an assault and battery. Dr. Williams' lawyers, Keith, Evans, Thompson & Fairchild and John D. O'Brien, argued that in circumstances such as this, where a physician acted to arrest disease and save life, a physician's actions should be held lawful even if the patient did not explicitly consent to the surgery.

== Opinion of the Court ==
In an opinion authored by Calvin L. Brown, the Minnesota Supreme Court ruled in favor of the plaintiff, Mrs. Mohr.

Justice Brown began by noting the basic principle of the law that "every person has a right to complete immunity of his person from physical interference of others, except in so far as contact may be necessary under the general doctrine of privilege; and any unauthorized touching of the person of another, except it be in the spirit of pleasantry, constitutes an assault and battery." Unlike the crime of assault and battery which requires proof of a bad intent, for the tort of assault and battery, a touching is unlawful if it is unauthorized regardless of the defendant's intent. Whether Dr. Williams' actions were authorized by Mrs. Mohr was a question of fact to be determined by the jury. The court held that the fact that Mrs. Mohr's family physician attended the operation and agreed with Dr. Williams' decision to operate on the left ear was irrelevant.

The court therefore affirmed the orders of the lower court.

The ruling suggested that just because a patient has agreed to receive one treatment from a physician, that consent does not imply that the patient has agreed to receive whatever other treatment the physician thinks is best. Particularly in the case of surgery, express consent for that surgery is required. The ruling is written with the premise that patients must be informed of the “dangers and risks” and agree to accept them before a physician provides treatment.

In writing its ruling, the court cited a torts treatise which said, "The patient must be the final arbiter as to whether he shall take his chances with the operation, or take his chances living without it." It also made a comparison between consent in the doctor patient relationship and in business contracts, suggesting that consents are like contracts in the sense of requiring informed discussion between the parties.
