= Wellbrock =

Wellbrock is a German surname. Notable people with the surname include:

- Florian Wellbrock (born 1997), German swimmer
- Walter Wellbrock (1893–1944), American farmer and politician
