= Red River Valley Conference =

Lutheran conference

The Red River Valley Conference was formed from a portion of the Lutheran Minnesota Conference of the Augustana Evangelical Lutheran Church in 1912. In 1941, the Red River Valley Conference absorbed the Bismarck and Sheyenne districts of North Dakota, previously of the Minnesota Conference. Initially, the conference included the Red River Valley and North Dakota to the west and extended to the St. Paul District to the east, covering about 300 miles (480 km) west to east and 50 miles (80 km) north to south.

Organizations within the Red River Valley Conference included the Women's Missionary Society, Young Women's Society, Junior Missionary Society, Luther League, and Lutheran Brotherhood. The conference's Board of Charities also proposed and managed Warren Hospital, Bethany Home for the Aged, and Bethany Children’s Home.

Red River Valley Conference had four educational institutions, all in Minnesota. They were Hope Academy in Moorhead (1888–1896), Lund Academy in Christine Lake (1899–1901), Northwestern College in Fergus Falls (1900–1932), and North Star College in Warren (1908–1936).

== Districts ==
The conference established several districts within it as the number of congregations and members grew.

=== Alexandria District ===
The Alexandria District was originally a mission field and the first district within the conference. The first congregation in the Alexandria District was organized at Oscar Lake in 1866 and served by Pastor J. P. Lundblad. The formal organization of the district took place in September 1879, by which time it had grown to 19 congregations with over 700 members. Due to increasing membership and geographical size, in 1898, the Alexandria District split into three districts: Central District, Red River District, and James River District (North Dakota).

Both Lund Academy and Northwestern College were established in the Alexandria District to provide educational opportunities to members of the region. Lund Academy, located in Christine Lake, operated from 1899 to 1901, while Northwestern College of Fergus Falls ran substantially longer, operating from 1900 to 1932. Northwestern offered courses in six areas, including the Academic, Normal, and Preparatory departments and the Schools of Commerce, Music, and Art.

=== Bemidji District ===
St. John's was the first congregation in the Bemidji District and was founded in 1881 in Fertile. The Bemidji District was organized from the northeast part of the Red River Valley Conference in 1919. At the time of its organization, it was composed of 12 congregations with over 1,000 members.

=== Fargo and North Dakota Districts ===
The James River District, formed in 1898, was split into the North Dakota and Fargo Districts in 1909. The first congregation, Maple Sheyenne, was established in North Dakota in 1878 and was led by Pastor A. P. Monten.

=== Red River District ===
The Red River District was created from the division of the Alexandria District in November 1886 and comprised the northern part of the conference. In 1881, Pastor J. G. Lagerstrom organized the first congregation in the district, the Black River Church near St. Hilaire. In 1888, the Lutheran Benevolent Society established Hope Academy in Moorhead, Minnesota. The academy offered scientific, classical, musical, and special English courses, and many students participated in the Star Lyceum Literary Society. Hope Academy was forced to close in 1896 due to declining numbers of the surrounding congregations. The Red River District was also home to North Star College in Warren, Minnesota, which operated from 1908 to 1936.

== Presidents ==
- S. W. Swenson (1912–1922)
- Oscar O. Gustafson (1922–1952)
- Walter E. Carlson (1952–1962)
