= Norwegian Lutheran Mission =

Norwegian religious organization

- Norwegian Lutheran Mission
- Norsk Luthersk Misjonssamband
- Abbreviation: NLM
- Formation: 1891
- Type: Missionary organisation
- Parent organization: Church of Norway
- Affiliations: Lutheranism
- Website: https://www.nlm.no
- Formerly called: Det Norske Lutherske Kinamisjonsforbund (Norwegian Lutheran Federation for Mission in China)

The Norwegian Lutheran Mission (Norsk Luthersk Misjonssamband in Norwegian; NLM) is one of several independent Lutheran organisations working within the Lutheran Church of Norway.

== History ==
The organization was founded in 1891 as Det Norske Lutherske Kinamisjonsforbund (in English: the Norwegian Lutheran Federation for Mission in China). The organisation's international mission was focused on China until that work came to an end in 1949. In 1966 the NLM, in cooperation with several other missional and denominational bodies, was involved in the establishment of the China Lutheran Seminary in Hsinchu City, Taiwan.

The organisation has later worked in countries such as Japan, Ethiopia, Bolivia, Peru, Taiwan, the Ivory Coast, and Mongolia, in addition to the work in Norway. It has been headquartered in Oslo since 1913.

== Doctrine ==
The NLM adheres to the confessional documents of the Church of Norway (the Bible, the Apostolic, Nicene, and Athanasian Creeds, the Augsburg Confession, and Luther's Small Catechism).

The organisation can be described as broadly evangelical with a focus on lay involvement. It has about 50,000 members. As inheritors of the pietist revival they are considered a conservative voice in the Norwegian context. Notably they have become known for their conservative views on same-sex marriage and female clergy (disputed among some members).

== Organisation ==
The work in Norway is focused on traditional local prayer-houses ('bedehus') and homegroups. Outside of Norway NLM is engaged in various forms of traditional missional activities (preaching and teaching) and development projects (education, community development etc.). NLM owns several of the country's Christian boarding schools and colleges.
