= Prince Albert Honeycutt =

- Born: December 28, 1852 near Pulaski, Tennessee
- Died: 1924 (aged 71–72); Fergus Falls, Minnesota
- Resting place: Oak Grove Cemetery

Prince Albert Honeycutt (December 28, 1852–1924) was an early African-American settler in Fergus Falls, Minnesota. He was the first Black professional baseball player, the first Black firefighter and the first Black person to run for mayor in the state of Minnesota.

== Biography ==
Honeycutt was born enslaved near Pulaski, Tennessee on December 28, 1852. During the Civil War, around age 10, he got permission from his mother Sophia Gardner to march with General William Sherman's Union troops as they came through town. He was too young to enlist but served as camp helper for Captain James Compton of the 52nd Illinois Infantry throughout the war.

Following the Civil War, Honeycutt returned briefly to Tennessee but found a hostile environment. He made his way to Chicago on foot, where he found Compton who was a civilian working in the banking industry. He followed the Compton family as they relocated to Fergus Falls, Minnesota in 1872.

Honeycutt worked as a teamster at a local flour mill. He organized the first baseball team in Fergus Falls in 1873 and called it the Fergus Falls North Star Club. He is recognized as the first professional Black baseball player in Minnesota history and played left field. He also volunteered with the local fire department in 1874 and was charged with ringing the fire bell to sound the alarm for other firefighters. He was elected fire department steward and represented the town at the statewide firemen's convention in 1890, held in Ashby, Minnesota.

In 1878, Honeycutt married Lena Marston, a white woman. This caused controversy throughout Minnesota, despite interracial marriage being legal, with letter writers in newspapers threatening violence. Compton served as a witness at the wedding ceremony. The couple had two children, Mary and Albert, before Lena passed away in 1882.

Honeycutt remarried to Nancy Brown in 1883 and had two daughters, Rose and Inez, and a son, Max, who died in infancy. Inez passed of tuberculosis at age 14. Mary and Rose were the first two Black graduates of Fergus Falls High School, and they both attended Moorhead Normal School and became public school teachers. Nancy taught piano lessons and served as a midwife. When Black visitors came to Fergus Falls, they boarded with the Honeycutts.

In 1884, Honeycutt opened his own barbershop business in downtown Fergus Falls. He had learned the trade from a fellow Civil War veteran. Some sources say that Honeycutt spoke Norwegian to customers, and in 1887, he added "an authentic and orthodox Finnish bathing house" to his barbershop. He built his own house in the town in 1885.

The Honeycutt family was also involved in city affairs, including parties and weddings. Honeycutt ran for mayor unsuccessfully in 1896, making him one of the first African-Americans in the country to do so. He finished with 130 votes, about 15% of the total count. Both Honeycutts testified in a capital murder trial when their servant was killed by her intimate partner.

In April 1898, eighty-five African Americans from Kentucky arrived in Fergus Falls. Honeycutt assisted in integrating them into the community, enrolling children in schools, joining churches, and finding housing and jobs. Some ran ads in the local newspaper which asked employers to contact Prince Honeycutt.

In 1921, Honeycutt was honored at the county fairgrounds along with other "Old Settlers" of Otter Tail County. Around the same time, Honeycutt was elderly, lost his eyesight, and almost lost his home to foreclosure. Local support and city assistance allowed Honeycutt to remain in his home.

In 1923, the Ku Klux Klan burned a cross in the town, not far from the location of Honeycutt's original barbershop. He saw crosses burned twice before his death. Honeycutt died in 1924 and is buried in Oak Grove Cemetery near his family.

== Historic home ==
Honeycutt built his house in Fergus Falls in 1885 at 612 Summit Ave E. The street was dedicated as Honeycutt Memorial Drive in 2021. The house was condemned in the 2020s and the city donated it to Flowingbrook Ministries. The organization struggled to pay, until an anonymous donor stepped up with the full amount. The organization hopes to restore the home and secure its recognition as a national historic site.
