= Calvin Brown =

American judge

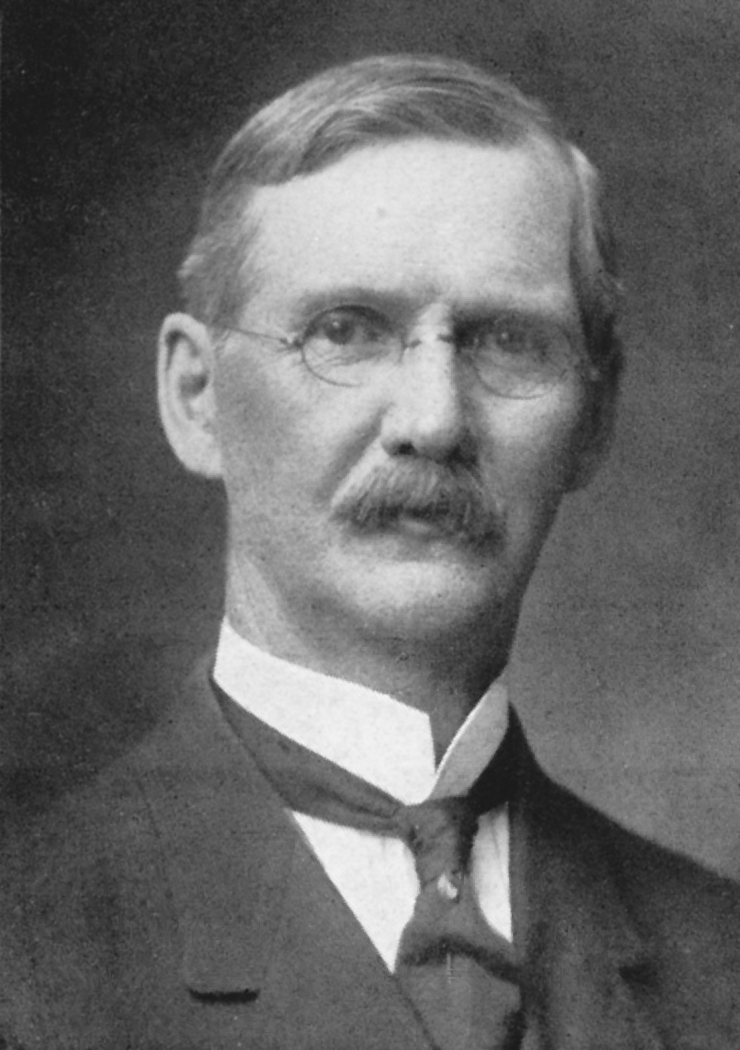
Calvin L. Brown

Calvin Luther Brown (April 26, 1854 – September 24, 1923) was an American lawyer and judge from Minnesota. He served as Chief Justice of the Minnesota Supreme Court from January 1913 until his death. In 1905, he authored Mohr v. Williams, a famous torts case.

He died at his home in Minneapolis on September 24, 1923.
