= Veldhuyzen van Zanten =

Veldhuyzen van Zanten or Veldhuijzen van Zanten is a Dutch family name. People with the name include:

- Jacob Veldhuyzen van Zanten, Dutch airline pilot at KLM who was involved in the 1977 Tenerife airport disaster
- Marlies Veldhuijzen van Zanten, Dutch politician
- Ida Veldhuyzen van Zanten, Dutch WW2 pilot

== See also ==
- Zanten, a surname
