= Hillcrest Lutheran Academy =

Coordinates: 46.27805283°N 96.08600736°W

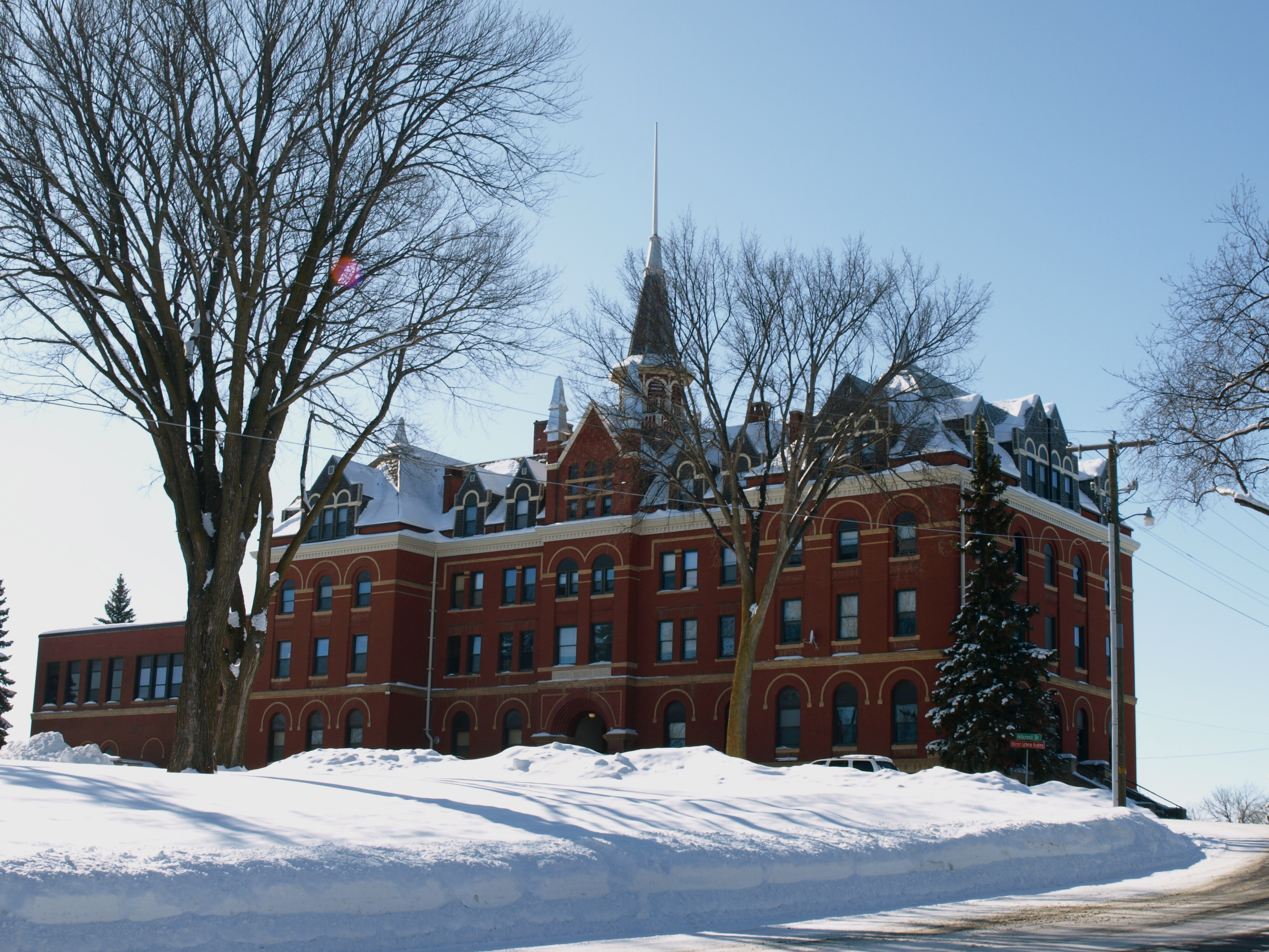

Location
- 610 Hillcrest Drive; Fergus Falls, Minnesota 56537; U.S.

Information
- Type: classical Christian academy with local, domestic and international students and a residence halls for high school
- Motto: "Equipping students in a Christ centered, Bible based environment for a life of eternal significance"
- Established: 1916
- School district: 544
- Principal: Luke Fiskness
- Grades: Preschool - 12th grade
- Student to teacher ratio: 12:1
- Colors: Red and White
- Nickname: Comets
- Newspaper: The Hillcrest Connection
- Yearbook: The Beacon
- Website: www.ffhillcrest.org

Hillcrest Lutheran Academy is a private Christian school in Fergus Falls, Minnesota. Established in 1916, Hillcrest is affiliated with the Church of the Lutheran Brethren of America.

Hillcrest's mission is "to equip students in a Christ-centered Bible-based environment for a life of eternal significance."

Hillcrest holds accreditation as a non-public high school through Cognia (formerly AdvancED) and the Minnesota Nonpublic School Accrediting Association (MNSAA).

== Campus ==
Hillcrest Lutheran Academy (HLA) occupies an historic building constructed in 1901 by the Norwegian Lutheran Synod to house the Park Region Luther College. The four-story red brick and sandstone building, located on a hilltop overlooking the city, is in the Romanesque Revival style and was designed by Twin Cities architects Omeyer and Thori, who also designed educational buildings at St. Olaf College, courthouses in Windom and Ada, and the E.J. Webber house and Ole Hagen's Autograph Block in Fergus Falls. Its construction, supervised by contractor John Lauritzen, required all of the brick masons available in the area. The building is listed on the National Register of Historic Places.

Park Region Luther College operated on the site until 1932, when the synod decided to concentrate its academic efforts on Concordia College in Moorhead. Three years later, the campus was sold to the Church of the Lutheran Brethren, which operates Hillcrest Lutheran Academy.

Hillcrest served as the high school department of Lutheran Brethren Schools from its founding until 2003, when it was incorporated as a separate school directly under the Church of the Lutheran Brethren, with its own president and school board. Hillcrest continued to share the campus with Lutheran Brethren Seminary, the theological training institute of the Church of the Lutheran Brethren. That was until in 2015, the seminary building was given to Hillcrest, which was renovated to the new Student Union, and the seminary moved across the street to a new addition attached to The Church of the Lutheran Brethren synod offices.

In 2020 Hillcrest Lutheran Academy merged with Morning Son Christian School to become one school: Hillcrest Lutheran Academy with a classical Christian education for students in preschool through 12th grade.

== Athletics ==
Hillcrest won the Minnesota 9-Man State Football Title in 2001 under Head Coach Richard Risbrudt and participating at the state level in basketball and soccer as well. Coach Risbrudt is also enshrined in the Minnesota High School Football Coaches Association Hall of Fame. Hillcrest's mascot is Winkey the Comet and the school colors are red and white.

== International partnerships ==
For the last three decades, Hillcrest has had a partnership with the Lutheran high school Danielsen Videregående Skole (Danielsen High School) in Bergen, Norway. Each year, 25 to 30 Norwegian students attend Hillcrest as juniors. In recent years, many international students have attended HLA as well.

== Notable alumni ==
Hillcrest has had some notable alumni including former Chief of Chaplains of the United States Army, General Gaylord T. Gunhus and aviation and construction pioneer Elling Halvorson who constructed a 13.5 mile water pipeline through the Grand Canyon in the 1960s and founder of Papillion Airways.
