= Fergus Falls City Hall =

- U.S. National Register of Historic Places
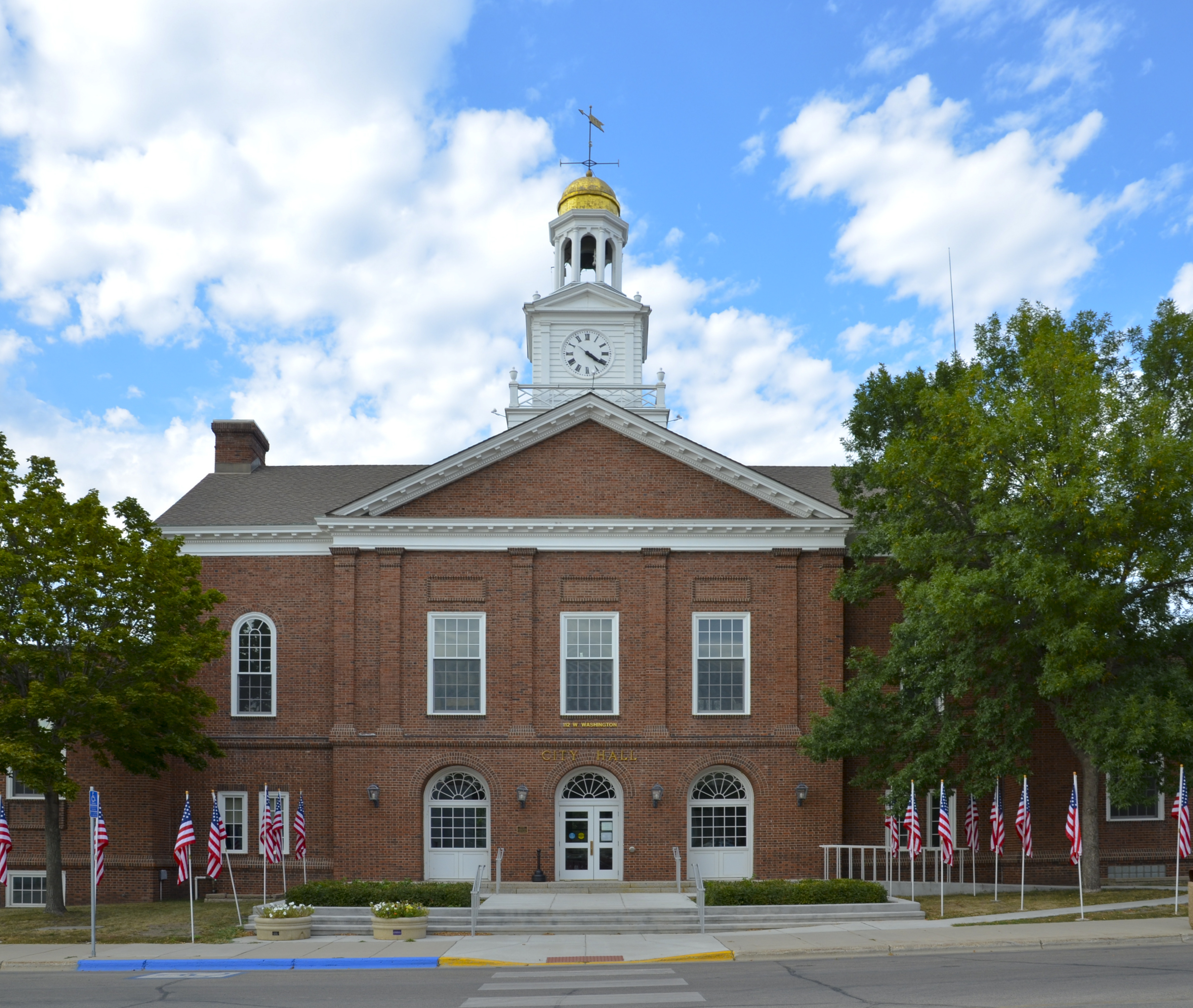

- Location within Minnesota Location within the United States
- Location: 112 W. Washington Ave. Fergus Falls, Minnesota
- Coordinates: 46°16′54″N 96°04′30″W
- Area: less than one acre
- Built: 1928
- Architect: William M. Ingemann
- Architectural style: Colonial Revival
- NRHP reference No.: 84001635
- Added to NRHP: May 10, 1984

Fergus Falls City Hall is the seat of the local government and a historic building located in Fergus Falls, Minnesota, United States. The previous city hall was destroyed in a fire in 1927. Vernon A. Wright donated the present location along the Otter Tail River. St. Paul architect William M. Ingemann won a design competition for the new city hall. The city council's choice of Ingemann was partly based on the fact he studied under noted architect Cass Gilbert, who designed the Minnesota State Capitol.

Ingemann used Independence Hall in Philadelphia as his inspiration for the new building. It features a two-story central block that is flanked by single-story symmetrical wings. A clock tower rises from the center of the central block. The basement on the north side is exposed given the slope of the property toward the river. When it was completed in 1928, the building housed the city offices, with the fire department and the city garage on the lower level. It was listed on the National Register of Historic Places in 1984.
