= Fergus Falls Public Schools =

School district in Minnesota, United States

Fergus Falls Public Schools (Independent School District No. 544) is a school district headquartered in Fergus Falls, Minnesota.

In the 2013–2014 school year the district had 2,486 students. This increased by 6.4% the 2014–2015 school year the district had 2,697 students. From that school year to the following one, it increased by 2%.

== Schools ==
The sole public secondary school is Kennedy Secondary School, formerly Fergus Falls High School. The district operates four elementary schools: Adams Elementary (grades 1–2), Cleveland Elementary (3–4), McKinley Elementary (K–1), and Prairie Science Class (4–5).
