= Kennedy Secondary School =

Location
- Fergus Falls, Minnesota; United States
- Coordinates: 46°17′25″N 96°3′52″W

Information
- Type: Public
- School district: Fergus Falls Public Schools
- Principal: Mark Anderson. Ivan Hirst
- Grades: 6–12
- Enrollment: 1,180 (2014–15)
- Colors: Maroon and Gold
- Mascot: Otters
- Website: https://fergusotters.org/schools/high-school-9-12

Kennedy Secondary School is the combined middle school and high school located in Fergus Falls, Minnesota, United States. It currently serves over 2,000 students and is a part of the Fergus Falls Public Schools system. The official school colors are maroon and gold, and the athletic teams are known as "The Otters". The Senior High School was renamed from Fergus Falls Senior High School to Kennedy Secondary School at the beginning of the 2010–2011 school year when the school was relocated to the former Fergus Falls Middle School following a three-year rebuilding project of that school.

== Athletics ==
Sports offered at Kennedy Secondary School:

- Adaptive Bowling
- Baseball
- Basketball
- Cross Country
- Football
- Golf
- Gymnastics
- Hockey
- Robotics
- Soccer
- Softball
- Speech
- Swimming and Diving
- Tennis
- Track and Field
- Volleyball
- Wrestling

== Presidential inaugural parades ==
In 2008, the Fergus Falls High School Marching band was selected out of 1300 applicants as one of 100 units to march in Former President Barack Obama's first inaugural parade. In 2012, the marching band was once again selected, this time out of 2800 applicants, to march in Former President Obama's second inaugural parade.

== State titles ==
On March 5, 2011, the Boys Swimming and Diving team won the first state title in FFHS history. It came down to the final 400 freestyle relay. The Otters beat St. Thomas Academy by 1 point and Breck/Blake by 4 points. On February 28, 2026, senior athlete Reece Hansen became state champion in the 100 yard backstroke for The Otters. Although swimming is not a popular sport, it has consistently been FFHS's most successful sport in the last couple decades.

== Notable alumni ==
- Clifford L. Hilton (1884), former Attorney General of Minnesota
- Colvin G. Butler (1898), former member of the Minnesota House of Representatives and Minnesota Senate
- Hannah Kempfer (1898), former member of the Minnesota House of Representatives
- Willard Munger (1932), former member of the Minnesota House of Representatives
- Donald Pederson (1943), electrical engineer who designed SPICE
- Chad Daniels (1993), comedian
- Jordan Rasmusson (2011), member of the Minnesota Senate
