= Park Region Luther College =

- U.S. National Register of Historic Places
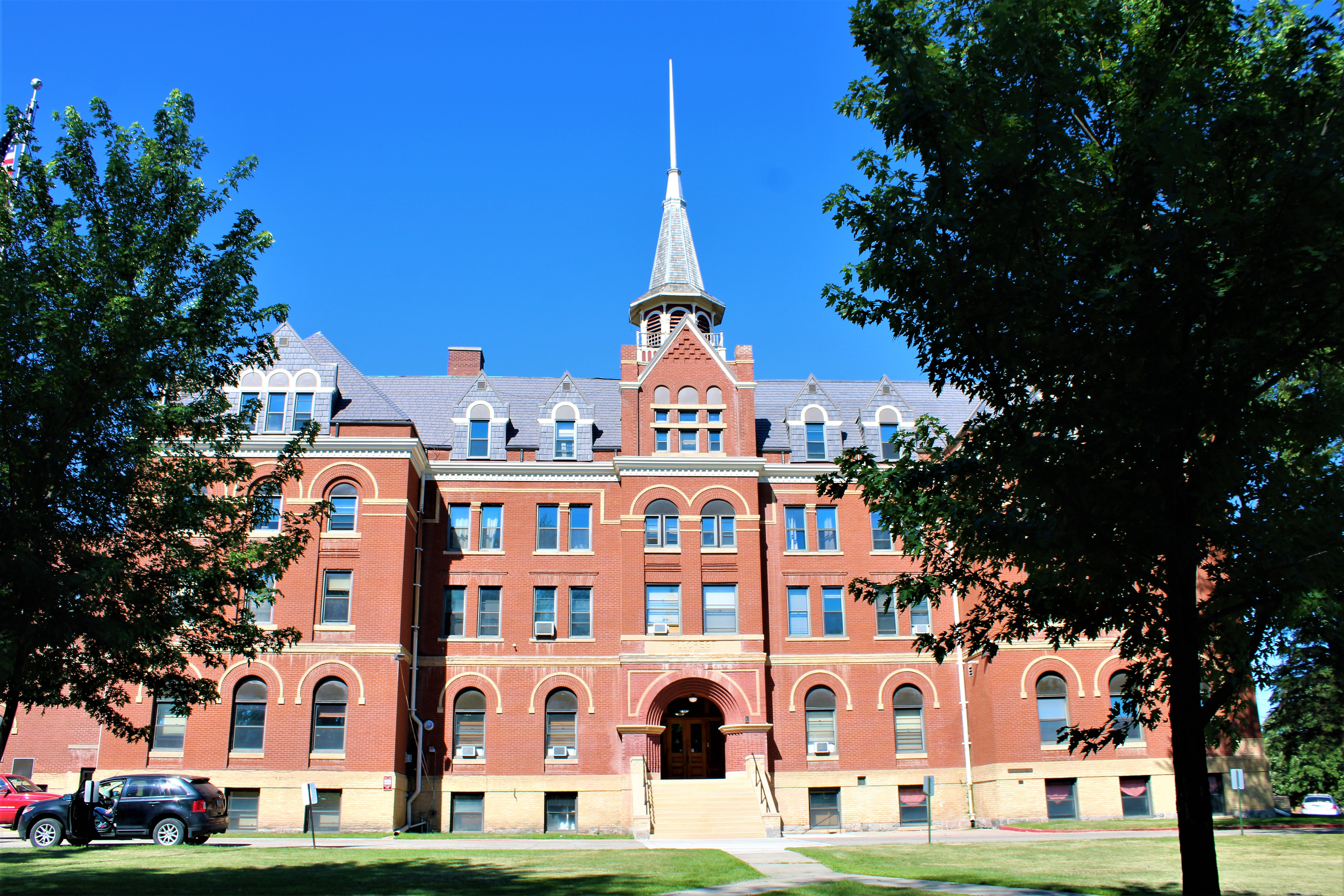
- The building in July 2022

- Location within Minnesota Location within the United States
- Location: 715 W. Vernon Ave., Fergus Falls, Minnesota
- Coordinates: 46°16′40″N 96°05′10″W
- Built: 1901
- Architect: Omeyer & Thori
- Architectural style: Romanesque
- NRHP reference No.: 84000241
- Added to NRHP: November 08, 1984

Park Region Luther College is a former educational institution in Fergus Falls, Minnesota. The college's main building is listed on the National Register of Historic Places. It is now occupied by Hillcrest Lutheran Academy, a private Christian junior high and boarding high school.

The historic building was constructed in 1901 with dormitory rooms for 200 students by the Norwegian Lutheran Synod to house the college. The four-story red brick and sandstone building, located on a hilltop overlooking the city, is in the Romanesque Revival style and was designed by Twin Cities architects Omeyer and Thori, who also designed educational buildings at St. Olaf College, courthouses in Windom and Ada, and the E.J. Webber house and Ole Hagen's Autograph Block in Fergus Falls. Its construction, supervised by contractor John Lauritzen, required all of the brick masons available in the area. The building was listed on the National Register of Historic Places in 1984.

Construction of the red brick and sandstone building required all the brick masons that could be found in the area. Arched windows, gabled dormers and a pencil-point belfry accentuate the building's height. As the topography levels off west of the city, the college's hilltop location contributes a commanding appearance in Classicized Revival.

Park Region Luther College operated on the site until 1932, when the synod decided to concentrate its academic efforts on Concordia College in Moorhead. Three years later, the campus was sold to the Church of the Lutheran Brethren, which operates Hillcrest Lutheran Academy.
