= China Lutheran Seminary =

Lutheran theological seminary in Taiwan

- Established: 1966
- Affiliation: Asia Theological Association
- Religious affiliation: Lutheran
- President: Rev. Dr. Samuel Liu
- Location: Hsinchu, Taiwan
- Website: http://www.cls.org.tw/EN/index.htm

China Lutheran Seminary is an independent theological school, graduate school, and seminary, located in Hsinchu City, Taiwan. Founded in 1966, the seminary is Lutheran in tradition and practice.

== History ==
China Lutheran Seminary was founded in 1966 by four Lutheran missional organisations: Evangelical Lutheran Free Church of Norway; Finnish Evangelical Lutheran Mission; Lutheran Brethren China Mission, USA; and the Norwegian Lutheran Mission. Following confirmation of its associated membership with the Asian Theological Association (ATA) in 1977, in 1978 CLS conferred its first two degrees: the B.Th and the B.R.E.. Five years after gaining membership to the Asia Theological Association, the China Lutheran Seminary became a member of the Association of Taiwan Theological Institutions. On 31 October, 1989, the China Lutheran Seminary was formally endorsed by the Taiwan Lutheran Church, and other affiliated Lutheran Church associations in Taiwan.

By 1998, the seminary had implemented several infrastructural changes. In 1994 the work to establish new halls of residence for both faculty and students and a new chapel and classrooms had been completed. The previous chapel and classrooms were renovated and reopened as a new administrative centre in 1998.

Further additions included the establishing of the Grassroots Mission Training Program in 1994, the Research Centre for Traditional Chinese Religions and New Religious Movements in 1995, and the China Lutheran Seminary Publishing House in 1997. Also in 1997, CLS formalised its partnership with Triumph Lutheran Brethren Church, which became the cooperative congregation on campus. In 1999 CLS sponsored a seminar focused on a ‘New Vision for the New Millennium’, named in honor of the Anglican priest, theologian, and author, John Stott. CLS is also affiliated with the acclaimed Presbyterian theologian and author, Frederick Buechner.

In 2003 CLS founded the Graduate School for Luther Studies, initially offering an M.Th program, an M.A. in Care and Counseling, and a Distance Learning Program. Since its establishment the Graduate School has added further programs, most recently the Doctor of Ministry degree.

By 2007 the construction of the Theological Education and Church Resource Building, begun in 2005, was completed. With the increased size of its campus, CLS was able to broaden its outreach, in 2008 becoming a base for a variety of para-church ministries, a place of worship for several congregations, and a retreat centre. In 2011 the Seminary completed its ‘School History Room’, and celebrated the 45th anniversary of its opening. 2012 saw the Seminary formalise its relationship with Lutheran Theological Seminary, Hong Kong. Both organisations signed a ‘sister seminary cooperation memorandum’, with the aim of furthering the outreach and collaborative effectiveness of each seminary.

== Academics ==
China Lutheran Seminary offers a number of degree programs, graduate certificates, and foundation programs. The degrees and certificates awarded by China Lutheran Seminary are accredited by the Asia Theological Association.
