= Evangelical Lutheran Free Church of Norway =

Lutheran church based in Norway

The Evangelical Lutheran Free Church Den Evangelisk Lutherske Frikirke
- Logo of the Den Evangelisk Lutherske Frikirke, shortened Frikirken
- Classification: Protestant
- Orientation: Lutheranism
- Polity: Synod
- Associations: Lutheran World Federation
- Region: Norway
- Origin: 1877
- Separated from: Church of Norway

The Evangelical Lutheran Free Church, or the Free Church as it is commonly known (Norwegian: Den Evangelisk Lutherske Frikirke, shortened Frikirken), is a nationwide Lutheran church in Norway, consisting of 83 congregations and 21,817 baptised members. It was founded in 1877 in Moss. It is distinct from the Church of Norway, although both churches are members of the Lutheran World Federation. The Free Church is economically independent.

== Doctrine and polity ==
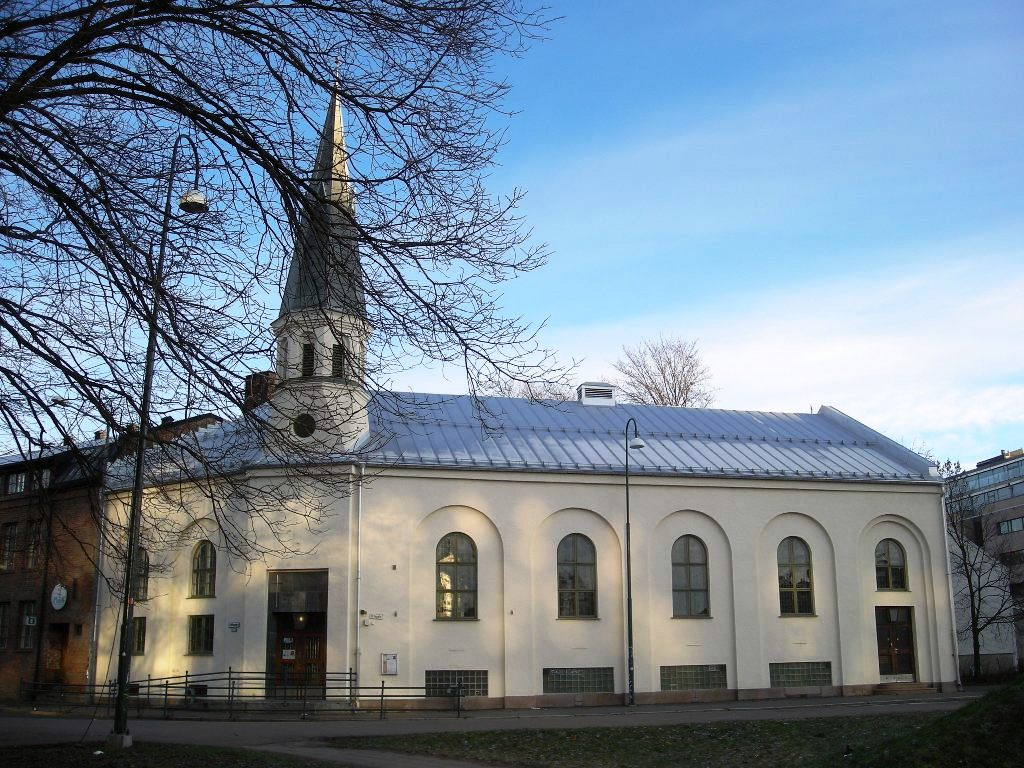
Oslo Østre frikirke, an Evangelical Lutheran Free Church in Oslo

The Evangelical Lutheran Free Church is founded on the Bible and the confession of the Evangelical Lutheran Church. The Frikirken 'believes, teaches, and confesses that the Bible is the only rule and guideline for faith, doctrine, and life'.

As a free church, the Frikirken is founded upon the local congregation (congregationalism). In each local congregation those who are baptised and confess the Christian faith are endowed with voting rights and responsibilities. Each congregation is led by ordained elders (presbyters), and each has the authority to call its clergy and all other personnel and pass its own church laws.

The highest authority in the denomination is the synod, which is a common national organisation, peopled with presbyters and representatives from each individual congregation. The synod convenes every three years, and it is governed by the synod board, which is made up of seven members, each of whom is elected by the general synod.

== Schools, colleges, and publications ==
The Frikirken has established several educational and publishing organisations. In 1921, the Frikirken founded the Fredtun Frikirkens Secondary School, which has now been renamed the Stavern Folkehøyskole (Stavern Folk High School). The Frikirken also established the Lutheran Bible and Church Seminary (LBM) in 1965. The Seminary was eventually renamed the Frikirkens Theological College (FTH), before becoming the University College of Staffeldts Gate (HiS) in 2004, following a merge with the Bible School in Oslo. In January 2013, HiS became part of the NLA University College, and was subsequently renamed the NLA University College Staffeldtsgate. In partnership with several other denominational and missional bodies, the Frikirken contributed to the establishment of the China Lutheran Seminary in 1966, in Hsinchu City, Taiwan.

The Frikirken instituted its own publication, Budbæreren (the Messenger) in 1883. It releases ten issues annually.
