= Peter Van Santen =

American politician (1913–2011)

Peter Van Santen (May 27, 1913 – March 12, 2011) was an American farmer and politician.

Van Santen was born in Fergus Falls, Minnesota and went to school in Folden Township, Otter Tail County, Minnesota. He lived with his wife and family in Battle Lake, Minnesota and was a farmer and cattle breeder. Van Santen was with the farmers union, dairy cooperatives, and the Democratic Party. Van Santen served on the Eagle Lake Township Board. He also served in the Minnesota House of Representatives in 1961 and 1962. In 1989, Van Santen and his wife moved to Dalton, Minnesota. Van Santen died at the Battle Lake Samaritan Center in Battle Lake, Minnesota.
