= Church of the Lutheran Brethren of America =

Christian denomination

- Classification: Protestant
- Orientation: Lutheran
- Theology: Conservative Christianity; Pietistic Lutheranism
- Headquarters: Fergus Falls, Minnesota
- Origin: 1900; Milwaukee, Wisconsin
- Separated from: United Norwegian Lutheran Church of America
- Congregations: 123 (2009)
- Members: 8,860 (2009)
- Official website: www.clba.org

The Church of the Lutheran Brethren of America (CLBA) is a Lutheran denomination of Christians rooted in a Pietist Lutheran spiritual awakening at the turn of the 20th century.

== History ==
=== Origins ===
Following the occurrence of a Pietist spiritual revival that swept through a large part of the Midwestern United States in the 1890s, an assembly of Lutherans who were influenced by this fervor felt the need to reject several former beliefs as incompatible with their newfound spirituality. They rejected the idea of receiving the unconverted into full membership or admitting them to Communion, replaced liturgical ceremonies with simple worship services, and formed new congregations to worship and serve according to these dictates of conscience.

=== Formation ===
Five such Lutheran congregations from the United Norwegian Lutheran Church of America met in Milwaukee, Wisconsin, on December 17, 1900, and organized a synod named the Church of the Lutheran Brethren. Its constitution was patterned after that of the Lutheran Free Church of Norway. The Lutheran Bible School, forerunner of the current schools in Minnesota, was founded in 1903 in Wahpeton, North Dakota.

== Doctrinal beliefs ==
The CLBA emphasizes the foundational place of the Bible, stating, "We believe the Bible is the inspired Word of God and free from error. It is authoritative for faith and conduct." Other beliefs include the triune Godhead; total depravity; the eternal Son-ship, Virgin Birth, sinless life, substitutionary atonement, bodily resurrection, personal return of Jesus; infant baptism; and Holy Communion. It has been noted for practicing open communion, teaching premillennialism, and not having the laity receive absolution from the pastor.

In addition to the denominational statement of faith, the church adheres to the following historic confessions: the Apostles' Creed, Nicene, and Athanasian creeds, the Augsburg Confession, and Luther's Small Catechism. Its strong emphasis on missions and evangelism and its stand for non-liturgical worship and a church composed only of confessing Christians differentiate it from most Lutherans in America. The CLBA considers itself to be "Lutheran in theological tradition and evangelical in practice".

== Organization ==
The Church of the Lutheran Brethren has 123 congregations with about 8,860 baptized members in the United States (114) and Canada (9), as well as about 1,500 congregations in Cameroon, Chad, Japan, and Taiwan. Its offices, the Lutheran Brethren Seminary, the Lutheran Center For Christian Learning, and the Hillcrest Lutheran Academy are located in Fergus Falls, Minnesota. The CLBA publishes a bimonthly magazine called Faith & Fellowship. The CLBA has been led by President Paul Larson since 2014.

The CLBA has been involved in a number of national and international missionary endeavours throughout its history. In 1966, the denomination, in partnership with several other missional bodies, instituted the China Lutheran Seminary in Hsinchu City, Taiwan.

== Presidents ==
- Knut O. Lundeberg 1900–1903
- J. J. Peterson 1903–1904
- E. M. Broen 1904–1905
- H. L. Westel 1905–1908
- E. M. Broen 1908–1914
- E. H. Gunhus 1914–1924
- M. E. Sletta 1924–1934
- E. H. Gunhus 1934–1938
- M. E. Sletta 1938–1948
- C. E. Walstad 1948–1953
- D. A. Erickson 1953–1954
- M. E. Sletta 1954–1956
- D. A. Erickson 1956–1968
- E. H. Strom 1968–1986
- Robert M. Overgaard 1986–2001
- Joel Egge 2001–2014
- Paul Larson 2014–Present
