= Charles Lundy Lewis =

American judge (1852–1936)

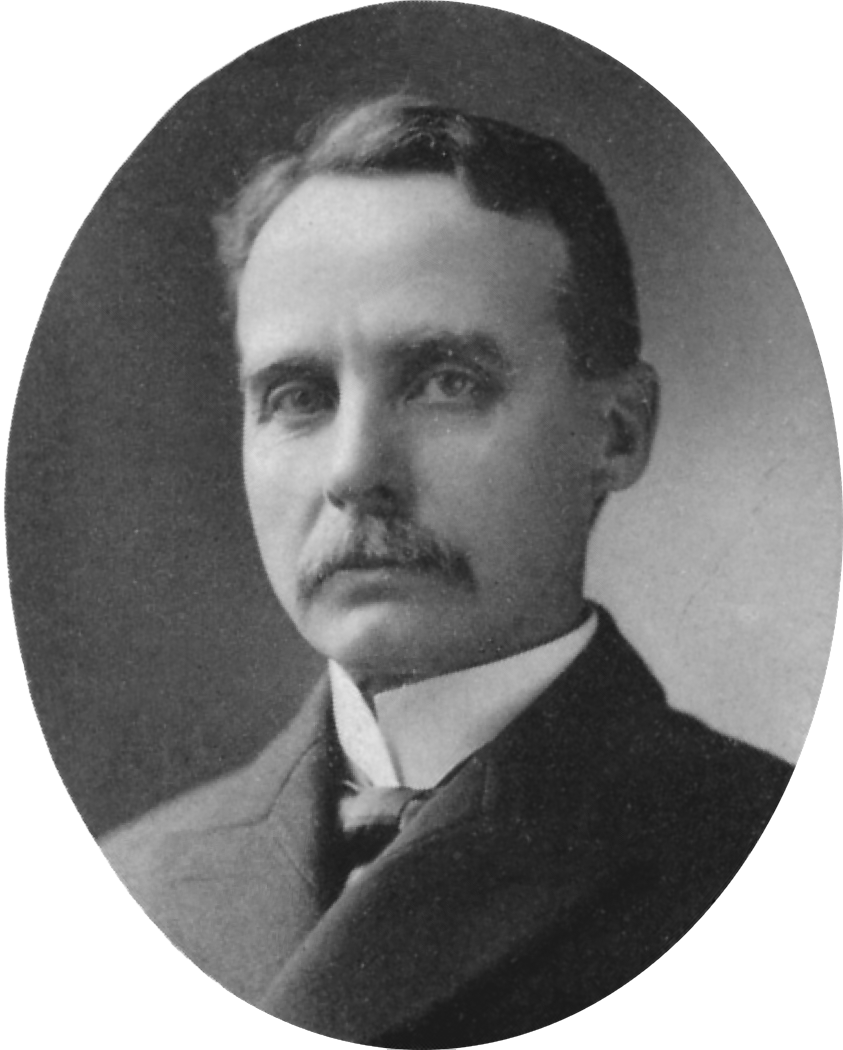
Charles Lundy Lewis

Charles Lundy Lewis (March 8, 1852 – February 11, 1936) was an American jurist.

== Biography ==
Born in Ottawa, Illinois, Lewis graduated from Oberlin College in 1876. He then studied law and was admitted to the Illinois bar in Chicago, Illinois in 1879. He practiced law in Fergus Falls, Minnesota and served as county attorney for Otter Tail County, Minnesota. In 1891, Lewis moved to Duluth, Minnesota and continued to practice law. In 1893, Lewis served as a Minnesota district court judge. Lewis served on the Minnesota Supreme Court from 1900 to 1912. He then moved to Los Angeles, California to practice law, and died there in 1936.
