= Walter Wellbrock =

American farmer and politician (1893-1944)

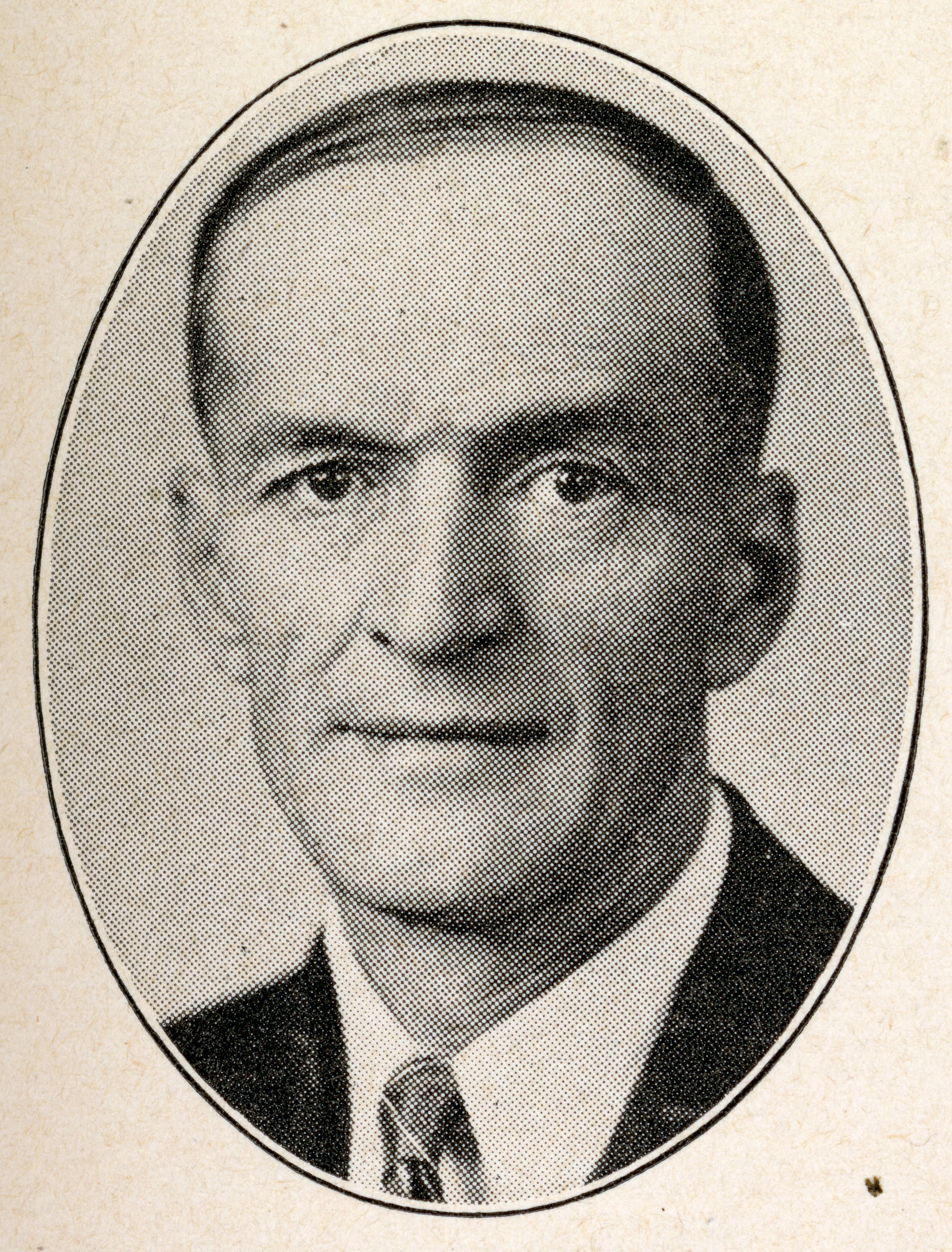
- Wellbrock in 1943

Member of the Minnesota House of Representatives from the 50th district
- In office January 4, 1943 – November 24, 1944
- Succeeded by: Roy B. Aune

Personal details
- Born: December 2, 1893 Otter Tail County, Minnesota, U.S.
- Died: November 24, 1944 (aged 50) Fergus Falls, Minnesota, U.S.
- Party: Nonpartisan
- Occupation: Farmer; businessman

Walter Wellbrock (December 2, 1893 – November 24, 1944) was an American farmer and politician. From 1943 until his death in 1944, Wellbrock served in the Minnesota House of Representatives as a representative of the state's 50th house district, which covered Otter Tail County.

== Early life ==
Walter Wellbrock was born on December 2, 1893, on the family farm in Otter Tail County, Minnesota. Prior to his election to office, he operated his own farm and resided in either Fergus Falls or Friberg Township. Wellbrock was the director of a cooperative oil company and the Otter Tail Fair Association.

== Political career ==
Wellbrock was elected to the Minnesota House of Representatives as a representative of the state's 50th house district on November 3, 1942. With four seats available, Wellbrock finished third out of eight candidates with 5,187 votes, or 13% of the total share. While at the time state legislators were nonpartisan, Wellbrock was a member of the conservative caucus.

During his first term in office, Wellbrock was a member of the house committees on commercial transportation, cooperatives, dairy products and livestock, markets and marketing, and public domain. With representative Charles Swindells, Wellbrock authored a bill that would make it a misdemeanor for hunters to wound anyone while hunting.

On November 7, 1944, Wellbrock again finished third in a field of eight to win re-election to his seat. He had 8,290 votes, or 12.98% of the total.

== Death ==
After being in ill health for "some time," per the Associated Press, Wellbrock died on November 24, 1944, less than three weeks after his win for re-election, in Fergus Falls.

Following his death, a special election was held to fill Wellbrock's seat. On December 27, 1944, former Otter Tail County School Superintendent Roy B. Aune was elected over Nora Rosholt by a margin of 2,921 votes to 2,067 votes to take over the seat.

== Personal life ==
Wellbrock was married and had five children. He survived his wife, who died on January 12, 1944.

== Bibliography ==
- Legislative manual of the State of Minnesota (PDF). Minnesota Department of Administration. 1943.
