= House of Santen =

van Santen / van Zanten
- Noble and patrician family
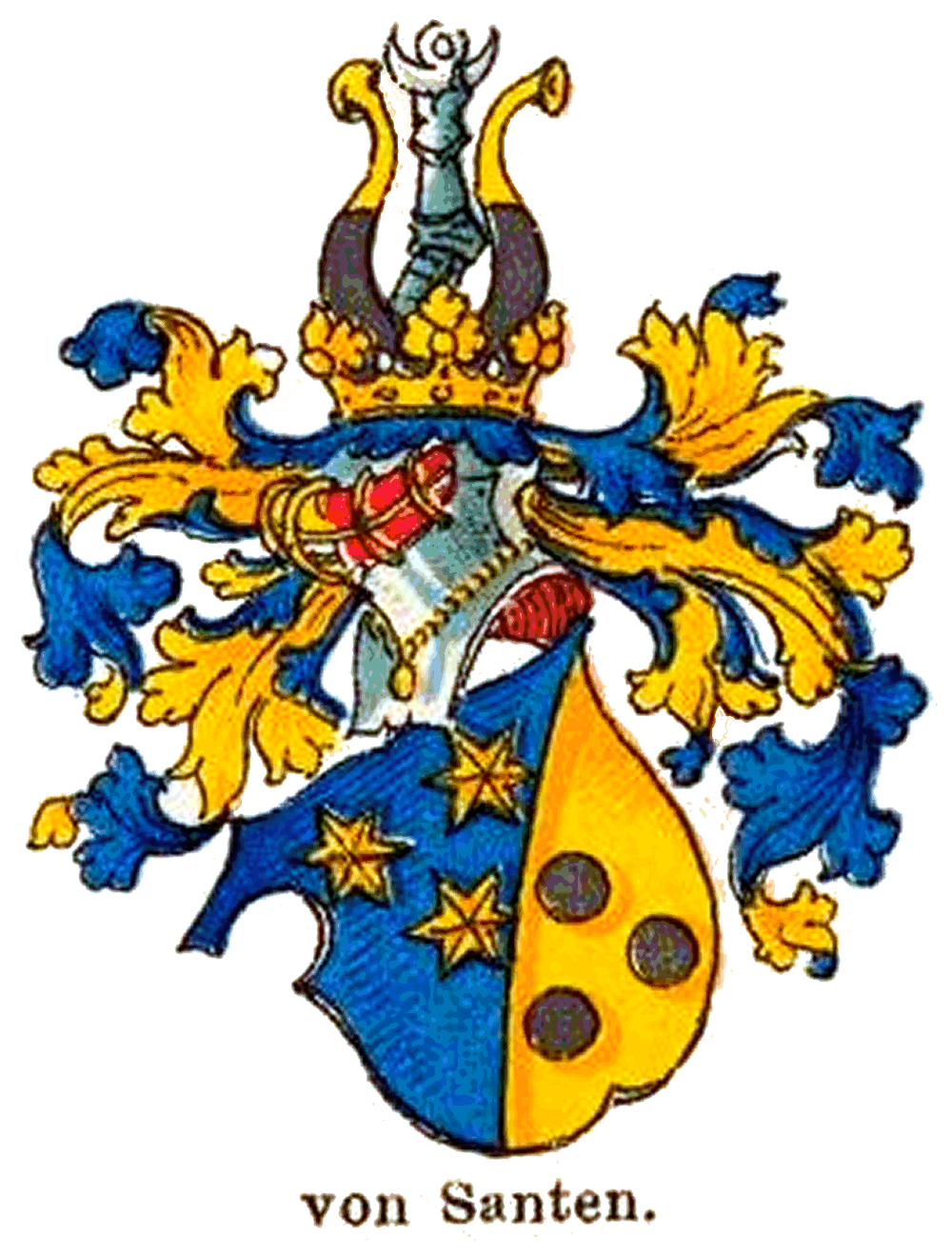
- Country: Germany; Netherlands
- Founded: Holy Roman Empire

The von Santen or von Zanten family name (spelled variously, also including van Santen, van Zanten) is a toponymic surname derived from the town of Xanten on the Rhine (Dutch: Santen), one of a number of Dutch van-names taken from towns in the Rhineland and Westphalia. Several distinct noble and patrician families adopted this name independently in different regions of the Holy Roman Empire and the Low Countries. This article groups them by shared name; a genealogical link between branches is noted only where it has actually been documented.

== Münster and East Frisian branch (Uradel) ==
One of the oldest extant German aristocratic families of this name belongs to the Uradel ('ancient nobility') of the Prince-Bishopric of Münster, a principality of the Holy Roman Empire.

The earliest known member of this branch is Johannes de Santen, a Ministerial of the Prince-Bishop of Münster circa 1295. The family served the Prince-Bishops as knights for several centuries until moving north to the County of East Friesland following the Reformation. There, they joined the patriciate of Emden and became considerable landowners in the surrounding areas and, after 1744, other parts of Prussia. All living members of this specific branch today are descended from Hans Paul von Santen (1578–1641).

=== Heraldry ===
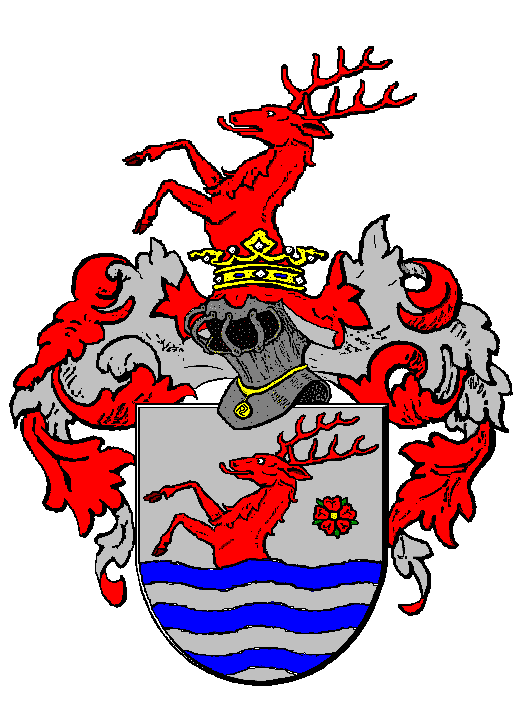
Coat of arms of Hans Paul von Santen 1626–1689 in Emden, Germany

Escutcheon: Argent, to a naissant stag Gules, mouv, of three fess wavy Azure in base and accompanied in chief in sinister of a rose of the second. Crest: an issuant stag Gules.

=== A separate Prussian/Mecklenburg family ===
A distinct armigerous family also named Santen is documented in the Mecklenburg/Prussian military nobility, bearing unrelated arms (a per-bend field of stars and cannonballs, crest an armoured arm holding a grenade between two buffalo horns). This family is covered separately on the German Wikipedia as Santen (Adelsgeschlecht) and is not documented as connected to the Münster/East Frisian branch above.

== Delft patrician branches ==
A separate, well-documented lineage bearing this name belonged to the patriciate of Delft in the County of Holland, distinct in both origin and heraldry from the branches above.

=== Van Santen (Delft), "three goats" arms ===
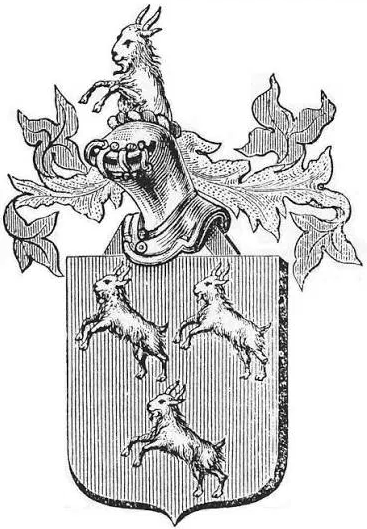
Coat of arms of the Van Santen family of Delft: Gules, three goats passant argent; crest a goat issuant. Engraving published in the Algemeen Nederlandsch Familieblad, ed. J.H. Scheffer (Rotterdam: A. Eeltjes, 1883).

This branch is first securely attested with Beuckel van Santen, whose son Gerrit van Santen (b. Delft, 1503) served as harbourmaster and later schepen (alderman) of Delft. The family produced numerous aldermen, treasurers, burgomasters and regents of Delft's civic institutions across the sixteenth and seventeenth centuries, and intermarried repeatedly with other Delft patrician families including Van der Burch, Van der Dussen, Duyst van Voorhout and Meerman.

A daughter of this line, Maria van Santen, married Joost van der Burch of Delft (son of Adam van der Burch and Maria van Oestgeest); Joost served on the Delft vroedschap from 1494 and as schepen from 1519, and died in 1535. A Van Santen–Van der Burch marriage of this kind is also documented in a pair of sixteenth-century pendant portraits bearing armorial programmes that include this Van Santen coat of arms, and in an eighteenth-century watercolour copy of the same portraits preserved in the Van Slingelandt Family Archive (Hoge Raad van Adel, The Hague); the portraits' own sitter is there named Joost Aemsz. van der Burch (d. 1570).

==== Heraldry ====
Escutcheon: Gules, three goats passant argent. Crest: a goat issuant argent.

=== Van Santen (Holland), "three peacocks" arms ===
A member of the Delft Van Santen family, Claes van Santen, sat on the Veertigraad (Council of Forty) of Delft from 1618, served as alderman in 1621, 1623 and 1633, and later as a naval commissioner, bearing arms of three walking silver peacocks on a blue field, crest a peacock in flight.

==== Heraldry ====
Escutcheon: Azure, three peacocks passant argent. Crest: a peacock displayed in flight.

=== Van Santen, Somersdijk ===
A further branch, associated with Somersdijk, bore: Or, three birds (two and one) and, in base, three fish placed bendwise arranged in fess, all sable.

== Other documented Dutch civic bearers ==
Several further individual bearers of the Van Santen name are documented as holding civic office elsewhere in Holland, each with distinct arms. Genealogical connection to the Delft branches above has not been established for any of these and should not be assumed from the shared surname alone.

- 's-Hertogenbosch: Sable, a chevron or.
- Kampen: Gerrit van Santen (c. 1596 – c. 1645), burgomaster of Kampen, and his son Daniel van Santen (b. Amsterdam, March 1646), bore: Or, a wavy fess argent, accompanied in chief by two eight-pointed stars and in base by a crescent, the crescent accompanied above by three and on either side by one bezant, all argent; crest a woman's bust proper.
- Gorinchem: Lambert Jansz. van Santen, schepen of Gorinchem in 1623, bore: Argent, three castles gules, each with an open gate.
- Scherpenzeel: Jan van Santen, schepen of Scherpenzeel, used a seal in 1778 showing a narrow bar with a bunch of grapes and an ear of corn below, and a house above in red.

Additional arms attributed to bearers of the Santen/Zanten name in Brittany, the Southern Netherlands (Aerschot, Calevoet, Soignies), and among descendants of emigrants to New York, are recorded in secondary compilations but are not corroborated by independent civic or genealogical documentation, or (in the case of a twentieth-century American heritage society's badge) are not historical grants of arms at all; they are omitted here pending further verification.

== Summary of documented branches ==
Branch	Region	Arms (escutcheon)	Relationship to other branches
Münster/East Frisian (Uradel)	Prince-Bishopric of Münster; later Emden	Argent, naissant stag gules, three wavy azure bars, a rose	Baseline; best documented
Prussian/Mecklenburg	Mecklenburg, Prussia	Per bend, stars and cannonballs	Separate family; see German Wikipedia
Van Santen, Delft (goats)	Delft, County of Holland	Gules, three goats passant argent	Independently documented via 1883 genealogy and portrait heraldry
Van Santen, Holland (peacocks)	Delft	Azure, three peacocks passant argent	Same Delft family as the goats branch, per 1883 genealogy
Van Santen, Somersdijk	Somersdijk	Or, three birds and three fish sable	Not yet connected to the Delft branches
's-Hertogenbosch, Kampen, Gorinchem, Scherpenzeel	various, Holland	see above	Individually documented civic bearers; connection to other branches unconfirmed
