= Fergus Falls, Minnesota =

City in Minnesota, United States

- City
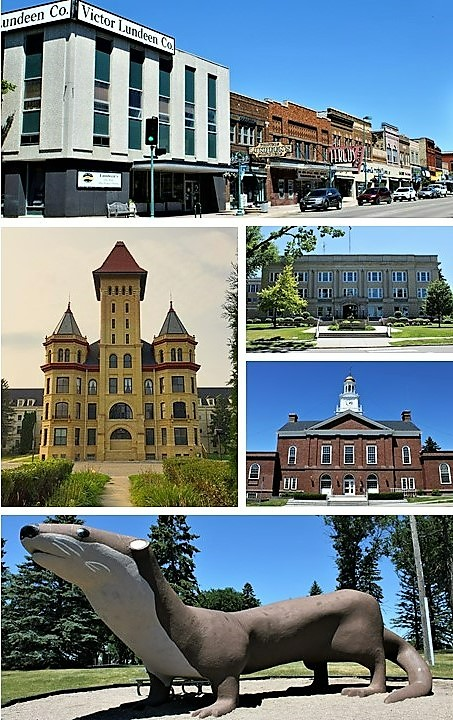
- Clockwise from top: Downtown Fergus Falls, Otter Tail County Courthouse, Fergus Falls City Hall, Otto the Otter in Grotto Park, Fergus Falls Regional Treatment Center (former state hospital)

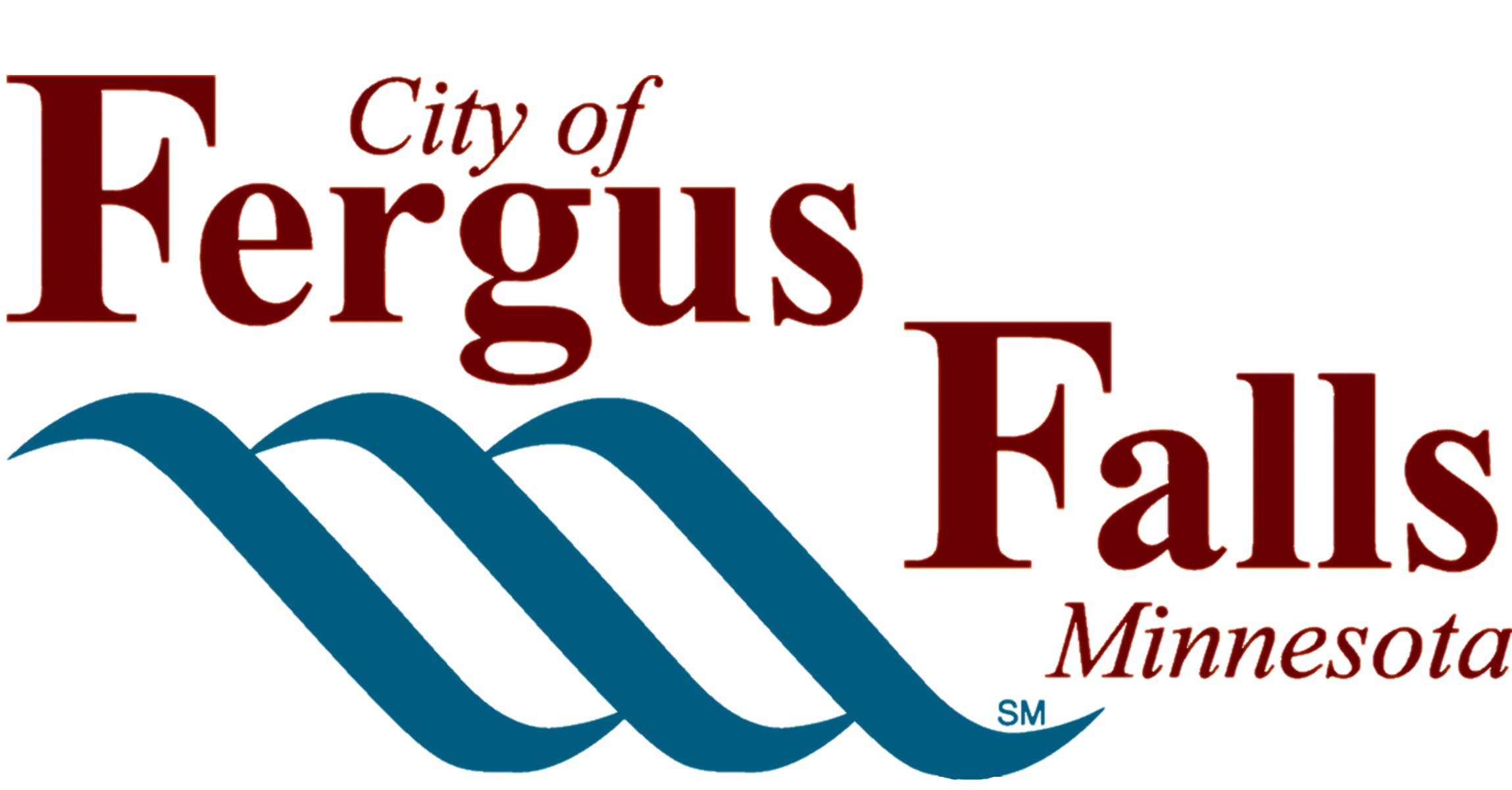
- Flag

- Location of Fergus Falls, Minnesota
- Coordinates: 46.285017°N 96.07611°W
- Country: United States
- State: Minnesota
- County: Otter Tail
- Platted: August 1870
- Incorporated (village): February 29, 1872
- Incorporated (city): March 3, 1881

Government
  - Mayor: Anthony J. Hicks
  - City Council: Ward 1: Jim Fish & Laura Job; Ward 2: Scott Kvamme & Mark Leighton; Ward 3: Mike Mortenson & Al Kremeier; Ward 4: Scott Rachels & Laurel Kilde

Area
  - City: 15.720 sq mi (40.715 km^{2})
  - Land: 14.388 sq mi (37.264 km^{2})
  - Water: 1.332 sq mi (3.450 km^{2}) 8.47%
- Elevation: 1,194 ft (364 m)

Population (2020)
  - City: 14,119
  - Estimate (2024): 14,258
  - Density: 991.0/sq mi (382.61/km^{2})
  - Urban: 13,116
  - Metro: 60,884 (US: 157th)
- Time zone: UTC–6 (Central (CST))
  - Summer (DST): UTC–5 (CDT)
- ZIP Code: 56537
- Area code: 218
- FIPS code: 27-20906
- GNIS feature ID: 2394758
- Sales tax: 7.875%
- Website: fergusfallsmn.gov

Fergus Falls (/ˈfɜːrɡəs/ FUR-gəss) is a city in and the county seat of Otter Tail County, Minnesota, United States. The population was 14,119 at the 2020 census, and was estimated to be 14,258 in 2024.

== History ==
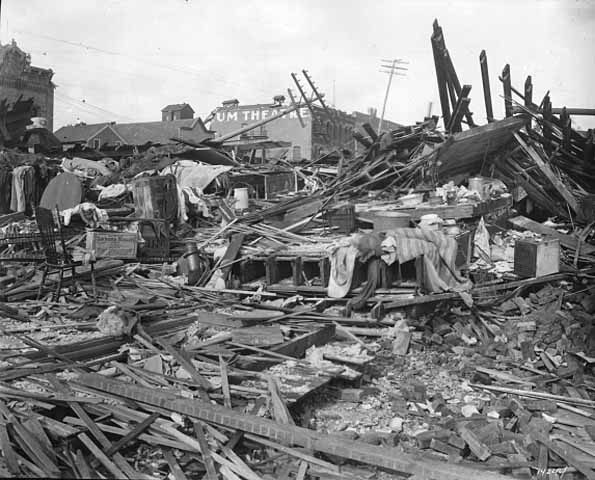
Fergus Falls after the 1919 tornado

The falls from which the city gets part of its name were discovered by Joe Whitford (a Scottish trapper) in 1856 and promptly named in honor of his employer, James Fergus. It is not known whether Fergus ever visited the city, but Whitford did not live to see the city develop, as he was killed during the 1862 Dakota war in western Minnesota. In 1867, George B. Wright was at the land office at St. Cloud and found Whitford's lapsed claim, purchased the land, and built what is now the Central Dam in downtown Fergus Falls around 1871. After Wright died in 1882, his son Vernon moved from Boston to Minnesota and took over his father's interests in the town. Vernon Wright was also one of the two people who established the Otter Tail Power Company in 1907. The city was incorporated in the late 1870s and is situated along the dividing line between the former great deciduous forest of the Northwest Territories to the east and the great plains to the west, in a region of gentle hills, where the recent geological history is dominated by the recession of the glaciers from the last great Ice Age, with numerous lakes and small rivers.

Two major tornadoes hit Fergus Falls during the early 20th century, the second, the 1919 Fergus Falls tornado, being the greater. The only church edifice left standing after the great cyclone was the predominantly black Baptist church.

=== 21st century ===
Fergus Falls features different parks, including tallgrass prairie and eastern woodlands, stores, and other tourist attractions. The Union Avenue Bridge spans the Otter Tail River, and was reconstructed in 2004. Just below the bridge is part of scenic River Walk Park, which spans about a mile of the river. The part nearest the Union Avenue Bridge was redone along with the bridge. The town hall was modeled after Independence Hall in Philadelphia. Its west wing housed the city fire station until the 1970s. Other points of interest include the county museum, Lake Alice, George B. Wright Park, Pebble Lake Golf Course, and Veteran's Memorial Park. Arts in Fergus Falls are booming with a community theater program downtown. Many local and professional artists perform at A Center for the Arts.

The city also lends its name to the song "Fergus Falls" by the band Field Report on its 2012 self-titled album.

Fergus Falls received international coverage in early 2017 and late 2018 after a news article in Der Spiegel falsely claimed there was an anti-Mexican sign at the city's entrance and fabricated other things about the town. The story's author, Claas Relotius, admitted to numerous instances of journalistic fraud. In December 2018, two residents of Fergus Falls, Michele Anderson and Jake Krohn, published a report pointing out the "11 most absurd lies" of the 2017 article. The same month Der Spiegel also sent a reporter to Fergus Falls to investigate and apologize.

=== Growth ===
The dams built on the Otter Tail River beginning in the 1880s were powerful economic forces that shaped the area's development. Returning soldiers from the American Civil War settled in the region, mostly as farmers (wheat and corn in the western plains and dairy and hogs in the eastern hills and forests). The importance of the Civil War experience to these early settlers is highlighted by the town's street names: the intersecting principal thoroughfares are Lincoln Avenue and Union Avenue. The oldest parts of the town have streets with names such as Sherman, Sheridan, and Vernon. The early English wave of settlement claimed control of the falls along the Otter Tail River and established the first Episcopalian and Presbyterian churches.

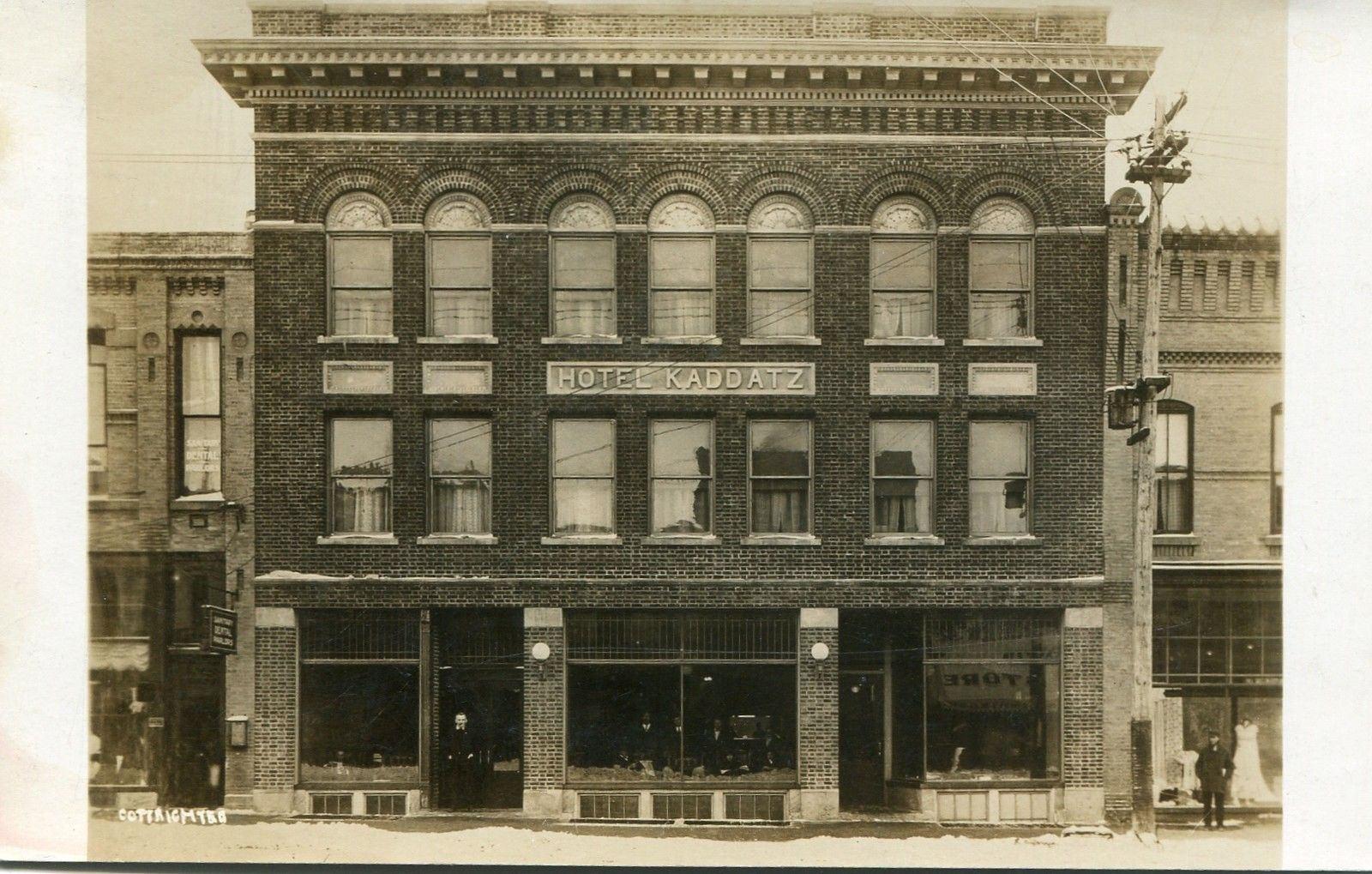
Hotel Kaddatz, Fergus Falls, Minnesota, 1920

=== Immigration ===
Almost as soon as the foundational structure of the town was laid, an influx of Norwegian immigrants arrived, by way of the Scandinavian migration of Chicago and Minneapolis, often on the Great Northern Railway. Primarily dairy farmers, they established numerous Lutheran churches in the area. The Lutheran Brethren (Church of the Lutheran Brethren of America) established an academy in Fergus Falls, which today operates a private high school, theological seminary and mission society, with an office in Fergus Falls. The pietistic, low-church Lutherans constituted one cultural center of the Norwegian-German community, while the high-church First Lutheran constituted a separate center, which attracted a more upwardly mobile class of parishioner.

=== Population growth and loss ===
After the Interstate Defense Highway System built Interstate 94 along the western edge of Fergus Falls in the late 1950s, population mobility increased dramatically, and high school graduates increasingly left the town to attend colleges in Morris, Fargo-Moorhead, or the Twin Cities of Minneapolis and Saint Paul. As farming declined as an occupation and lifestyle, with large-scale commercial farming gradually replacing the family farm system during the second half of the 20th century, the city appeared increasingly destined to become a retirement and nursing community until a new migration of younger remote workers moved to the city. The bucolic environment, with abundant sporting opportunities that had long attracted summer vacationers. The relatively low cost of real estate, cost of living, and a variety of public-school locations have also attracted families to the city.

== Geography ==
According to the United States Census Bureau, the city has a total area of 15.720 square miles (40.71 km^{2}), of which 14.388 square miles (37.26 km^{2}) is land and 1.332 square miles (3.45 km^{2}) (8.47%) is water.

Interstate 94, U.S. Highway 59, U.S. Highway 52, and Minnesota State Highway 210 (co-signed), and County Highways 1, 82, and 88 are the main routes in Fergus Falls.

=== Lakes ===
Lake Name	Size (Acres)
Alice	31
Hoot	161
Opperman	84
Pebble	169
Wright	66

=== Major highways ===
The following routes are located within the city of Fergus Falls.

- Interstate 94/U.S. Highway 52
- U.S. Highway 59
- Minnesota State Highway 210
- Otter Tail County Highway 1
- Otter Tail County Highway 82
- Otter Tail County Highway 88

=== Climate ===
Climate data for Fergus Falls, Minnesota, 1991–2020 normals, extremes 1893–2018
Month	Jan	Feb	Mar	Apr	May	Jun	Jul	Aug	Sep	Oct	Nov	Dec	Year
Record high °F (°C)	56 (13)	57 (14)	80 (27)	94 (34)	105 (41)	105 (41)	110 (43)	105 (41)	105 (41)	93 (34)	74 (23)	65 (18)	110 (43)
Mean daily maximum °F (°C)	18.4 (−7.6)	22.3 (−5.4)	35.6 (2.0)	52.9 (11.6)	66.8 (19.3)	76.3 (24.6)	80.8 (27.1)	79.4 (26.3)	70.8 (21.6)	55.7 (13.2)	38.0 (3.3)	24.4 (−4.2)	51.8 (11.0)
Daily mean °F (°C)	9.0 (−12.8)	12.7 (−10.7)	26.9 (−2.8)	42.3 (5.7)	55.9 (13.3)	66.3 (19.1)	70.8 (21.6)	68.2 (20.1)	59.8 (15.4)	45.4 (7.4)	29.7 (−1.3)	16.1 (−8.8)	41.9 (5.5)
Mean daily minimum °F (°C)	−0.4 (−18.0)	3.2 (−16.0)	18.1 (−7.7)	31.8 (−0.1)	45.0 (7.2)	56.3 (13.5)	60.7 (15.9)	57.1 (13.9)	48.9 (9.4)	35.1 (1.7)	21.4 (−5.9)	7.9 (−13.4)	32.1 (0.0)
Record low °F (°C)	−38 (−39)	−42 (−41)	−31 (−35)	−2 (−19)	19 (−7)	29 (−2)	37 (3)	34 (1)	20 (−7)	2 (−17)	−23 (−31)	−35 (−37)	−42 (−41)
Average precipitation inches (mm)	1.29 (33)	0.83 (21)	1.15 (29)	2.00 (51)	3.86 (98)	4.35 (110)	3.28 (83)	2.95 (75)	3.04 (77)	2.37 (60)	1.04 (26)	0.71 (18)	26.87 (681)
Average snowfall inches (cm)	11.9 (30)	7.2 (18)	8.1 (21)	1.0 (2.5)	0.0 (0.0)	0.0 (0.0)	0.0 (0.0)	0.0 (0.0)	0.0 (0.0)	0.8 (2.0)	7.6 (19)	7.4 (19)	45.0 (114)
Average precipitation days (≥ 0.01 in)	4.1	2.9	4.1	4.4	8.1	9.6	8.4	6.1	6.2	5.5	4.5	4.4	68.3
Average snowy days (≥ 0.1 in)	5.2	3.1	3.0	0.7	0.0	0.0	0.0	0.0	0.0	0.3	3.5	4.4	20.2
Source 1: NOAA (snow/snow days 1981–2010)
Source 2: XMACIS2

== Demographics ==
Historical population
Census	Pop.	Note	%±
1880	1,635		—
1890	3,772		130.7%
1900	6,072		61.0%
1910	6,887		13.4%
1920	7,581		10.1%
1930	9,389		23.8%
1940	10,848		15.5%
1950	12,917		19.1%
1960	13,733		6.3%
1970	12,443		−9.4%
1980	12,519		0.6%
1990	12,362		−1.3%
2000	13,471		9.0%
2010	13,138		−2.5%
2020	14,119		7.5%
2024 (est.)	14,258		1.0%
U.S. Decennial Census; 2020 Census

As of the 2023 American Community Survey, Fergus Falls has a median household income of $50,865. Approximately 10.7% of the city's population lives at or below the poverty line. Fergus Falls has an estimated 61.4% employment rate, with 27.8% of the population holding a bachelor's degree or higher and 95.5% holding a high school diploma.

The top five reported ancestries (people were allowed to report up to two ancestries, thus the figures will generally add to more than 100%) were English (97.5%), Spanish (1.6%), Indo-European (0.5%), Asian and Pacific Islander (0.3%), and Other (0.1%).

=== Racial and ethnic composition ===
Fergus Falls, Minnesota – racial and ethnic composition Note: the US Census treats Hispanic/Latino as an ethnic category. This table excludes Latinos from the racial categories and assigns them to a separate category. Hispanics/Latinos may be of any race.
Race / ethnicity (NH = non-Hispanic)	Pop. 2000	Pop. 2010	Pop. 2020	% 2000	% 2010	% 2020
White alone (NH)	12,987	12,407	12,737	96.41%	94.44%	90.21%
Black or African American alone (NH)	81	145	246	0.60%	1.10%	1.74%
Native American or Alaska Native alone (NH)	101	102	116	0.75%	0.78%	0.82%
Asian alone (NH)	77	87	112	0.57%	0.66%	0.79%
Pacific Islander alone (NH)	1	2	8	0.01%	0.02%	0.06%
Other race alone (NH)	3	1	34	0.02%	0.01%	0.24%
Mixed race or multiracial (NH)	99	189	518	0.73%	1.44%	3.67%
Hispanic or Latino (any race)	122	205	348	0.91%	1.56%	2.46%
Total	13,471	13,138	14,119	100.00%	100.00%	100.00%

=== 2020 census ===
As of the 2020 census, there were 14,119 people, 6,171 households, and 3,379 families residing in the city. The median age was 42.0 years. 21.4% of residents were under the age of 18 and 24.8% were 65 years of age or older. For every 100 females there were 92.5 males, and for every 100 females age 18 and over there were 89.9 males age 18 and over.

The population density was 981.6 inhabitants per square mile (379.0/km^{2}). 92.9% of residents lived in urban areas, while 7.1% lived in rural areas.

Of households in the city, 23.4% had children under the age of 18 living in them. 40.4% were married-couple households, 20.3% were households with a male householder and no spouse or partner present, and 32.6% were households with a female householder and no spouse or partner present. About 39.8% of all households were made up of individuals, and 19.2% had someone living alone who was 65 years of age or older.

There were 6,731 housing units at an average density of 468.08 per square mile (180.7/km^{2}). Of all housing units, 8.3% were vacant. The homeowner vacancy rate was 1.8% and the rental vacancy rate was 8.8%.

=== 2010 census ===
As of the 2010 census, there were 13,138 people, 5,814 households, and 3,262 families residing in the city. The population density was 931.0 inhabitants per square mile (359.5/km^{2}). There were 6,342 housing units at an average density of 449.47 per square mile (173.5/km^{2}). The racial makeup of the city was 95.48% White, 1.12% African American, 0.81% Native American, 0.66% Asian, 0.02% Pacific Islander, 0.37% from some other races and 1.55% from two or more races. Hispanic or Latino people of any race were 1.56% of the population.

There were 5,814 households, of which 25.5% had children under the age of 18 living with them, 43.0% were married couples living together, 9.6% had a female householder with no husband present, 3.5% had a male householder with no wife present, and 43.9% were non-families. 38.7% of all households were made up of individuals, and 18.2% had someone living alone who was 65 years of age or older. The average household size was 2.15 and the average family size was 2.84.

The median age in the city was 43.4 years. 21.4% of residents were under the age of 18; 8.4% were between the ages of 18 and 24; 22% were from 25 to 44; 25.9% were from 45 to 64; and 22.2% were 65 years of age or older. The gender makeup of the city was 47.0% male and 53.0% female.

=== 2000 census ===
As of the 2000 census, there were 13,471 people, 5,633 households, and 3,306 families residing in the city. The population density was 1,031.5 inhabitants per square mile (398.3/km^{2}). There were 5,909 housing units at an average density of 452.5 per square mile (174.7/km^{2}). The racial makeup of the city was 97.02% White, 0.62% African American, 0.76% Native American, 0.57% Asian, 0.01% Pacific Islander, 0.20% from some other races and 0.82% from two or more races. Hispanic or Latino people of any race were 0.91% of the population.

There were 5,633 households, out of which 28.1% had children under the age of 18 living with them, 47.2% were married couples living together, 9.0% had a female householder with no husband present, and 41.3% were non-families. 35.5% of all households were made up of individuals, and 18.0% had someone living alone who was 65 years of age or older. The average household size was 2.25 and the average family size was 2.94.

In the city, the population was spread out, with 23.0% under the age of 18, 10.0% from 18 to 24, 24.5% from 25 to 44, 20.3% from 45 to 64, and 22.1% who were 65 years of age or older. The median age was 40 years. For every 100 females, there were 89.0 males. For every 100 females age 18 and over, there were 85.6 males.

The median income for a household in the city was $31,454, and the median income for a family was $44,280. Males had a median income of $32,051 versus $20,841 for females. The per capita income for the city was $18,929. About 7.0% of families and 10.8% of the population were below the poverty line, including 11.4% of those under age 18 and 10.0% of those age 65 or over.

== Economy ==
Fergus Falls is a micropolitan with a diversified economy that includes healthcare, manufacturing, commercial, agricultural, information technology, and utilities. The largest employer is Lake Region Healthcare, an integrated health system with a 108-bed hospital, cancer research center, assisted living community, and multiple clinics.

=== Top employers ===
According to the City's 2023 Annual Comprehensive Financial Report, the largest employers in the city are:

#	Employer	Type of Business	# of Employees	Percentage
1	Lake Region Healthcare Corporation	Hospital	845	8.86%
2	Fergus Falls Public Schools ISD #544	Education	422	4.43%
3	Otter Tail County	Government	391	4.10%
4	Otter Tail Power Company	Public Utility	369	3.87%
5	Pioneer Home	Nursing Home	210	2.20%
6	City of Fergus Falls	Municipality	199	2.09%
7	Productive Alternatives	Vocational Rehabilitation Service	179	1.88%
8	Veterans Home	Nursing Home	179	1.88%
9	LB Homes	Nursing Home	149	1.56%
10	Vector Windows	Manufacturing	146	1.53%
—	Total employers	—	3,089	32.39%

== Education ==
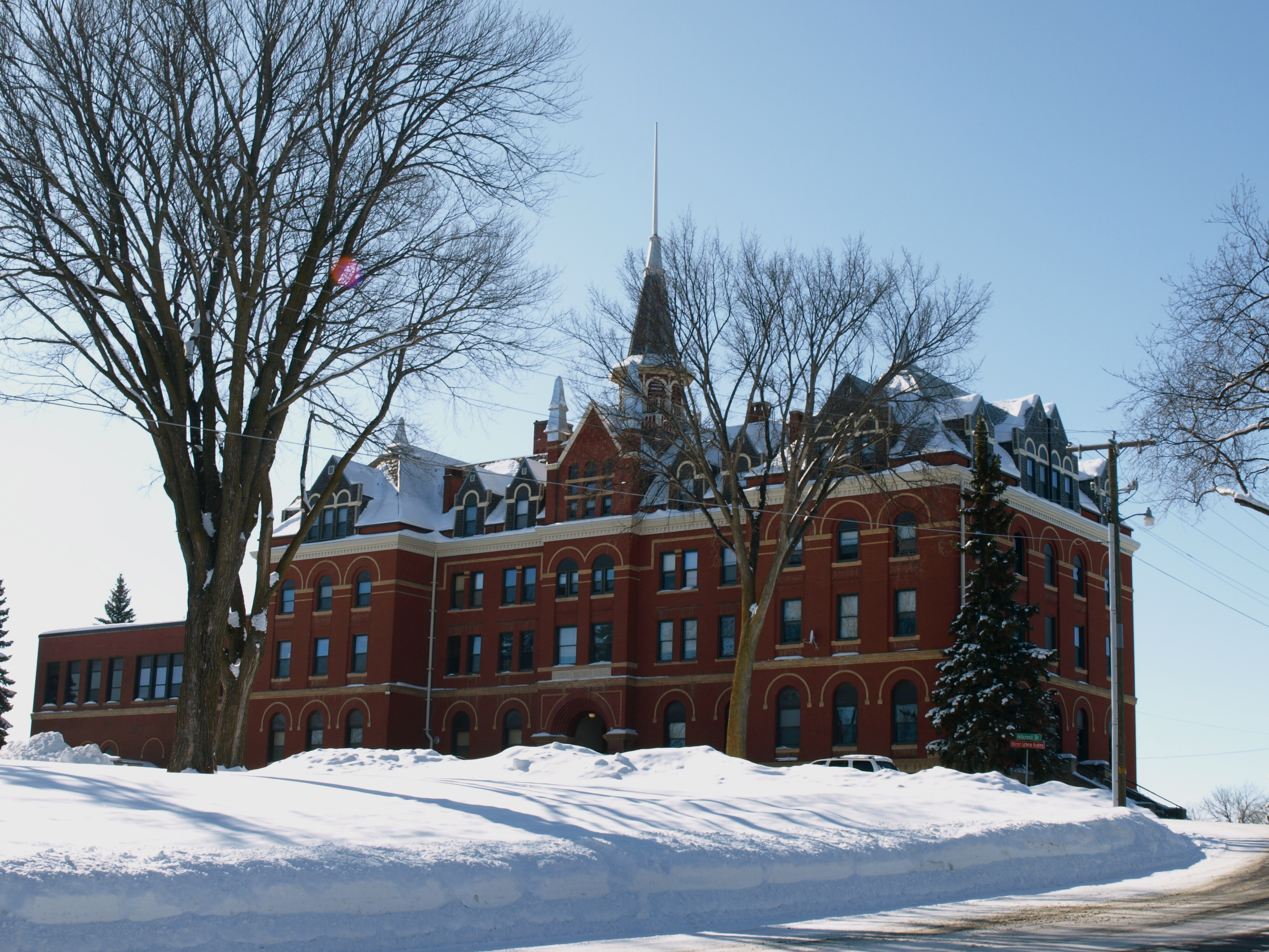
Hillcrest Lutheran Academy in Fergus Falls

Fergus Falls Public Schools (Independent School District #544) operates public schools.

=== Elementary schools ===
- Adams Elementary (1-2)
- Cleveland Elementary (3-4)
- McKinley Elementary (K-1)
- Prairie Science Class (4-5)

=== Middle school ===
- School of Choice, Homeschool Co-op (K-8)

=== Secondary school ===
- Kennedy Secondary School (6-12), with separate middle and high school divisions, is the sole public secondary school

=== Private schools ===
- Claire Ann Shover Nursery School (Pre K)
- Trinity Lutheran Elementary (Pre K)
- Our Lady of Victory School (K-6)
- Hillcrest Lutheran Academy (Pre K-12)

=== Higher education ===
- Lutheran Brethren Seminary
- Minnesota State Community and Technical College
- Park Region Luther College (no longer exists)

== Arts and culture ==
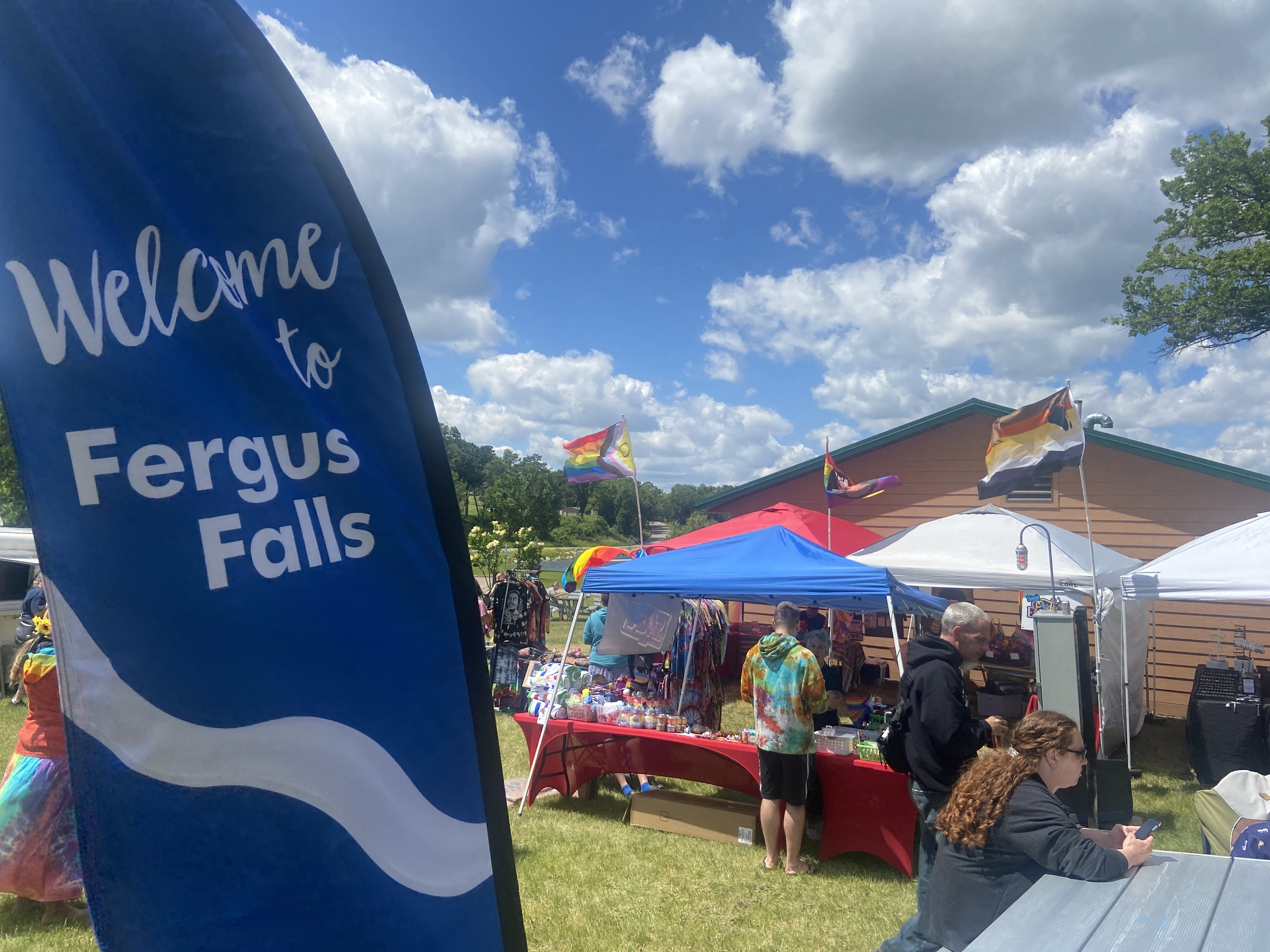
Fergus Pride festival picnic at Pebble Lake

Fergus Falls is home to several arts and culture organizations and has a reputation of being a cultural hub in West Central Minnesota.

A Center for the Arts building was originally built in 1921 and was home to The Orpheum Theater, producing live theater and vaudeville performances and movies. In the early 1990s, after several decades of change and transition, over $1 million was raised to renovate the theater and A Center for the Arts was founded. The Theater is also home to one of the largest pipe organs in the midwest, the Mighty Wurlitzer Theater Pipe Organ.

The Kaddatz Galleries is a nonprofit art gallery located in historic downtown Fergus Falls, whose mission is to foster visual arts education and appreciation, and to maintain a gallery where the works of Charles Beck and other recognized local artists are accessible to the public. The Kaddatz Galleries were founded in 2001 when Artspace bought The Kaddatz Hotel building in partnership with the Hotel Kaddatz Preservation Association. The upstairs of the Kaddatz Hotel Building is home to artist live/work spaces.

The Lake Region Arts Council serves 9 counties (Becker, Clay, Otter Tail, Wilkin, Traverse, Stevens, Grant, and Pope) and has its main office in the River Inn Building in Fergus Falls. The Lake Region Arts Council's mission is to encourage and support the arts in West Central Minnesota. Their programs and services are made possible through an appropriation from the Minnesota State Legislature, Legacy Arts & Cultural Heritage Fund and the McKnight Foundation.

Springboard for the Arts, a nonprofit artist service organization based in St. Paul, has its only satellite office in the River Inn Building, which serves as an artist resource center.

The band Field Report has a song named after Fergus Falls on their eponymous debut album. Lead singer and songwriter, Chris Porterfield, once dated a woman from the town, but the song is actually about a woman he spotted at a downtown Milwaukee music festival. "I saw a girl who was pregnant, and she was with a guy who looked like an asshole," he said. "She looked like she wanted to get out of there. The song was written from her perspective." The song has received critical acclaim.

== Media ==
- Television
  - Public, educational, and government access
- Radio
  - 1020 AM KJJK (AM) (Sports), Leighton Broadcasting
  - 1250 AM KBRF (Talk), Leighton Broadcasting
  - 90.7 FM K214FP (Christian), CSN International
  - 89.7 FM KCMF (Classical), Minnesota Public Radio
  - 91.5 FM KNWF (News), Minnesota Public Radio
  - 96.5 FM KJJK-FM (Country), Leighton Broadcasting
  - 99.5 FM KPRW (Adult Contemporary), Result Radio, Inc.
  - 103.3 FM KZCR (Adult Album Alternative), Leighton Broadcasting
- Newspaper
  - The Daily Journal
  - The Midweek Inc

== Sports ==
Fergus Falls is the home of the Fergus Falls Otters as well as home to M State - Fergus Falls sports and many other local teams and organizations for children, teens, adults and seniors.

== Twin towns ==
Fergus Falls is twinned with:

Fife, Scotland, United Kingdom
Hordaland, Norway

== Notable people ==
- Elmer Ellsworth Adams, Minnesota newspaper editor and politician
- Frank Albertson (1909–1964), actor who appeared in over 100 Hollywood movies including It's a Wonderful Life and Psycho.
- Marcus Borg, theologian; one of the leaders of the Jesus Seminar
- Peter Brandvold, author
- Marvin W. Bursch, state legislator and businessman; worked in Fergus Falls briefly
- Colvin G. Butler, Minnesota state legislator
- Moses Clapp, Minnesota politician
- Donald Cressey, (1919–1987) American penologist, sociologist, and criminologist who made innovative contributions to the study of organized crime, prisons, criminology, the sociology of criminal law, white-collar crime. His work is still used in Fraud investigations today.
- Chad Daniels (b. 1975), comedian, "Comedy Central Presents: Chad Daniels" (2008, 1/2 hour TV special)
- Roger L. Dell, Chief Justice of the Minnesota Supreme Court
- Richard Edlund, multi-Academy Award-winning visual effects artist for his work on Star Wars, The Empire Strikes Back, Raiders of the Lost Ark, and Return of the Jedi
- Clifford L. Hilton, Minnesota Supreme Court justice
- Prince Albert Honeycutt (1852-1924), African American pioneer, entrepreneur, sportsman, firefighter
- Chuck Knapp, radio broadcaster
- Charles Lundy Lewis, Minnesota Supreme Court justice
- Mary MacLane (1881–1929), pioneering feminist author, film-maker, and media personality. Her tomboy youth was spent in Fergus Falls from approximately 1884–1889.
- Mark W. Olson, former member of Board of Governors of U.S. Federal Reserve
- Ben Schierer (b. 1973), lieutenant governor-elect of Minnesota and former mayor of Fergus Falls
- Cliff Sterrett (1883–1964), innovative and influential artist and cartoonist
- Dave Theurer, creator of Atari's Missile Command, Tempest (video game), and I, Robot (video game)
- Peter Van Santen, Minnesota politician and farmer
- Walter Wellbrock, Minnesota politician and farmer
- Charles Brewster Wheeler, U.S. Army brigadier general
- Ernest J. Windmiller, Minnesota politician and businessman

== City Council ==
The Fergus Falls City Council meets the first and third Monday of the month at 5:30 pm in the City Council Chambers located at 112 W Washington Avenue. The City Council is composed of eight Council members and the Mayor, with two city council members from each of the four wards.

=== List of mayors of Fergus Falls, Minnesota ===
The list below is the recent history of the Mayor of Fergus Falls, MN.

#	Mayor	Term
1	J. A. Allen	1881–1882
2	Robert Miller	1882–1883
3	Henry G. Page	1883–1885
4	Charles D. Wright	1885–1887
5	Jacob Austin	1887–1888
6	H. E. Rawson	1888–1889
7	Jasper W. Earl	1889–1891
8	A. B. Cole	1891–1893
9	John W. Mason	1893–1894
10	T. N. McLean	1894–1896
11	Chauncey L. Baxter	1896–1899
12	Frank J. Pfefferle	1899–1901
13	Martin T. McMahon	1901–1903
14	Edward J. Webber	1903–1905
15	John L. Townley	1905–1907
16	H. T. Hille	1907–1909
17	John L. Townley	1909–1910
18	D. M. Brown	1910–1911
19	Aurthur G. Anderson	1911–1912
20	W. H. McBride	1912–1914
21	Dr. Alvinza B. Cole	1914–1916
22	Leonard Eriksson	1916–1918
23	George W. Frankberg	1918–1920
24	T. W. Donovan	1920–1921
25	Harold J. Nelson	1921–1923
26	Martin Benson	1923–1927
27	Peter M. Ree	1927–1930
28	H. G. Page	1930–1931
29	Leonard Eriksson	1931–1933
30	Dr. Julius Theurer	1933–1938
31	Philip R. Monson	1938–1939
32	James S. Eriksson	1939–1940
33	Philip R. Monson	1940–1941
34	Paul J. Stender	1941–1947
35	Helmer E. Swenson	1947–1948
36	Martin O. Brandon	1948–1950
37	Gustav M. Kantrud	1950–1952
38	Gus M. Kantrud	1952–1954
39	Henry A. Winther	1954–1956
40	Vernon H. Sprague	1956–1959
41	H. J. Hermanson	1959–1961
42	Virgil I. Hanson	1961–1965
43	M. J. Quarum	1965–1967
44	K. W. Wenino	1967–1973
45	Barbara B. Donoho	1973–1977
46	Mel O. Olson	1977–1981
47	Calvin "Kelly" Ferber	1981–2002
48	Russell Q. Anderson	2002–2009
49	Hal Leland	2009–2017
50	Ben Schierer	2017–2024
51	Anthony J. Hicks	November 5, 2024 to present
