= Trinity Lutheran Church =

Trinity Lutheran Church or Trinity Evangelical Lutheran Church or variations thereof may refer to:

== Australia ==
- Trinity Lutheran Church, Warrayure, Victoria

== Canada ==
- Trinity Evangelical Lutheran Church (Toronto), Ontario

== United States ==
- Trinity Lutheran Church (Burr Ridge, IL)
- Trinity Evangelical Lutheran Church (Abilene, Kansas), listed on the National Register of Historic Places (NRHP) in Kansas
- Historic Trinity Lutheran Church, Detroit, Michigan
- Trinity Lutheran Church (Henning, Minnesota), listed on the NRHP in Minnesota
- Trinity Lutheran Church (Altenburg, Missouri)
- Trinity Lutheran Church (Freistatt, Missouri)
- Trinity Lutheran Church (Friedheim, Missouri)
- Trinity Lutheran Church (St. Louis, Missouri)
- Trinity Evangelical Lutheran Church of Manhattan, New York
- Trinity Lutheran Church (Queens, New York), listed on the NRHP in New York
- Trinity Lutheran Church and Cemetery (Stone Arabia, New York), listed on the NRHP in New York
- Trinity Lutheran Church (Rutherfordton, North Carolina), listed on the NRHP in North Carolina
- Trinity Lutheran Church (Canton, Ohio)
- Trinity Lutheran Church (Cleveland), Ohio
- Trinity Lutheran Church (Reading, Pennsylvania), listed on the NRHP in Pennsylvania
- Trinity Lutheran Church (Elloree, South Carolina), listed on the NRHP in South Carolina
- Trinity Lutheran Church (Victoria, Texas), listed on the NRHP in Texas
- Trinity Evangelical Lutheran Church, Milwaukee, Wisconsin
