= Bethany Baptist Church =

Bethany Baptist Church may refer to:

- Bethany Baptist Church (Newark, New Jersey)
- Bethany Baptist Church (New York City)
- Bethany Baptist Church (South Norfolk) located in Chesapeake, Virginia
