= Christ Church Lutheran =

Christ Church Lutheran may refer to:

- Christ Church Lutheran (Minneapolis, Minnesota)
- Christ Church Lutheran (New York City)
- Old Christ Church Lutheran (New York City)
