= Hannibal Ford =

American engineer

Hannibal C. Ford
- Born: Hannibal Choate Ford; May 8, 1877; Dryden, New York, New York, U.S.
- Died: March 13, 1955 (aged 77); Kings Point, New York, New York, U.S.
- Occupation: Engineer
- Known for: Developing the Ford Mk 1A Computer
- Spouse: Katherine Moyer (m. 1918)
- Parents: Susan Augusta Giles; Abram Millard Ford

Hannibal Choate Ford (1877–1955) was an American inventor and electrical engineer best known for his work during the first half of the 20th century.

== Biography ==
Hannibal C. Ford was born in Dryden, New York on May 8, 1877, to Susan Augusta Giles and Abram Millard Ford, the publisher and editor of the weekly Dryden Herald. He graduated with a B.S. in electrical engineering from Cornell University in 1903. While there he worked in the Sibley College electrical engineering laboratory.

Ford began working for Elmer Ambrose Sperry’s Sperry Gyroscope Company in 1909, where he quickly became chief engineer and helped turn the gyrocompass into a military-grade product. He left Sperry in 1915 to launch what would become the Ford Instrument Company. Before retiring in 1943, he would hold the patents to over 50 inventions, many of which would prove to be integral to the development of fire control rangekeepers and analog computers used by the United States Navy during World War II.

He was married to Katherine Moyer on July 4, 1918. His sister, Grace Conable, was married to noted 20th-century architect George W. Conable, who is best known for designing Holy Trinity Lutheran Church (1908) and Messiah Evangelical Lutheran Church (1926).

He died on March 13, 1955, in Kings Point, New York shortly after suffering a stroke.

== Notable Inventions ==
Ford Mk 1A Computer, an electromechanical fire control computer designed for use on ships that could predict a target’s position based on data inputs.

Ford Mk 2 Computer, known as the "Baby Ford," a small-ship version of the Ford Mk 1A used in destroyers and the secondary batteries of larger ships.
