= Emergency Ward (album) =

Emergency Ward!

Live album by Nina Simone
- Released: 1972
- Recorded: Live at Fort Dix and studio
- Genre: Gospel, jazz, avant-garde
- Length: 34:31
- Label: RCA Victor
- Producer: Nina Simone, Andrew Stroud, Weldon J. Irvine, Jr.

Nina Simone chronology
Here Comes the Sun (1971)	Emergency Ward! (1972)	It Is Finished (1974)

Professional ratings
Review scores
Source	Rating
AllMusic	4/5 stars
Record Collector	4/5 stars
Encyclopedia of Popular Music	3/5 stars

Emergency Ward! is a 1972 album released by Nina Simone. The album is considered to be Simone's statement on the Vietnam War and was described as "consistently thrilling" by AllMusic's Mark Richardson.

According to the liner notes, Emergency Ward! was "recorded live in concert at various locations including Fort Dix". The Japanese release consists of just three tracks. Side one is filled with an eighteen-and-a-half-minute medley of George Harrison's "My Sweet Lord" and David Nelson's poem "Today Is a Killer". Richardson describes the gospel-like performance as "a powerhouse medley ... one of Simone's finest moments". It was performed together with the Bethany Baptist Church Junior Choir of South Jamaica, New York. In a 2006 review of the album, Paul Rigby of Record Collector likened "My Sweet Lord/Today Is a Killer" to the opening 15 minutes of Steven Spielberg's war film Saving Private Ryan and said that "it breathlessly knocks you for six".

Side two consists of the Lennie Bleecher–Jeremy Wind song "Poppies" and George Harrison's "Isn't It a Pity" (the latter originally a double A-side with "My Sweet Lord", the ex-Beatle's highly successful first solo single). Despite the "in concert" claim on the album cover, according to the booklet with The Complete RCA Albums Collection box set, tracks 1 and 4 were recorded on November 18, 1971 at Fort Dix, and tracks 2–3 were recorded at the RCA Studio in New York City.

Nina Simone improvises upon and varies the lyrics of the poem and songs, for which she takes all responsibility in the liner notes. Additional information gives credit for choral arrangements and orchestration to Weldon J. Irvine, Jr., to her brother (Sam Waymon) for vocals on "My Sweet Lord", and to her daughter Lisa Stroud (aged nine) for polyrhythms in the same song. Gratitude is expressed to Nat Shapiro and Andrew Stroud.

The title of the record is rendered as "Emergency Ward" on the record label itself, but as "Emergency Ward!" on the cover sleeve. The sleeve also bears the text "Nina Simone in Concert".

== Track listing ==
No.	Title	Writer(s)	Length
1.	"Medley: My Sweet Lord / Today Is a Killer"	George Harrison, David Nelson, Nina Simone	18:35
2.	"Poppies"	Lennie Bleecher, Jeremy Wind	4:45
3.	"Isn't It a Pity"	George Harrison	11:11
4.	"Let It Be Me" (Bonus track on the release included on The Complete RCA Albums Collection)	Gilbert Bécaud	5:00

== Personnel ==
- Choral Group - Bethany Baptist Church Junior Choir of South Jamaica, New York
- Orchestrations - Weldon J. Irvine, Jr.
- Recording Engineer - Ed Begley
