= Here Comes the Sun (Nina Simone album) =

Studio album by Nina Simone
- Released: April 1971
- Recorded: February 1971
- Studio: RCA Victor's Studio B New York City
- Genre: Jazz, blues, African folk
- Length: 37:43
- Label: RCA Victor
- Producer: Harold Wheeler, Nat Shapiro

Nina Simone chronology
Black Gold (1970)	Here Comes the Sun (1971)	Emergency Ward! (1972)

Professional ratings
Review scores
Source	Rating
AllMusic	3/5 stars
Rolling Stone	favorable

Here Comes the Sun is the thirteenth studio album by American singer Nina Simone, consisting of cover versions of songs by pop and rock musicians, released by RCA Records in April 1971.

It features songs recorded in the RCA studios with a full orchestra and backing vocals. Although Simone covers songs by Bob Dylan and the Beatles, among others, most of the versions feature arrangements substantially different from the original recordings. This is most clear in the final song "My Way", which with its fast pacing rhythm deviates significantly from the usual interpretations.

== Track listing ==
Side one
No.	Title	Writer(s)	Length
1.	"Here Comes the Sun"	George Harrison	3:37
2.	"Just Like a Woman"	Bob Dylan	4:53
3.	"O-o-h Child"	Stan Vincent	3:22
4.	"Mr. Bojangles"	Jerry Jeff Walker	5:03

Side two
No.	Title	Writer(s)	Length
1.	"New World Coming"	Barry Mann, Cynthia Weil	4:53
2.	"Angel of the Morning"	Chip Taylor	3:36
3.	"How Long Must I Wander"	Weldon Irvine	6:31
4.	"My Way"	Paul Anka, Claude François, Jacques Revaux	5:48

== Personnel ==
- Nina Simone – piano, vocals
- Corky Hale – harp
- Backing vocals assembled by Howard Roberts
- Orchestra assembled by Kermit Moore
- Arranged by Harold Wheeler and Nina Simone
- Conducted by Harold Wheeler
- Sam Waymon – production coordination

== Details ==
- "Just Like a Woman", a song by Bob Dylan. In the last verse, Simone changes the original third person perspective into first person.
- "O-O-H Child", a song originally by The Five Stairsteps
- "My Way", an adaptation by Paul Anka of the French song "Comme d'habitude", written by Claude François and Jacques Revaux. Simone's self-arranged version features up-tempo backing instruments (especially drums and conga) and angelic backing vocals. It is different from other interpretations in its fast-pacing rhythm and African influence.
- The song "Tell It Like It Is" was also recorded during the sessions but not released till 1998 on the compilation The Very Best of Nina Simone: Sugar in My Bowl 1967–1972.

== Certifications ==
Region	Certification	Certified units/sales
Australia (ARIA)	Gold	35,000^{^}
^{^} Shipments figures based on certification alone.
