= Emergency ward (disambiguation) =

Emergency ward normally refers to the emergency department of a hospital.

It may also refer to:

- Emergency Ward (album), an album
- Emergency Ward (film), a film
- Emergency – Ward 10, a British TV series
