= Old Christ Church Lutheran (New York City) =

Former church in Manhattan, New York

Coordinates: 40.85598°N 73.93439°W

- Interactive map of the Old Christ Church Lutheran area

General information
- Location: New York, New York, United States of America
- Construction started: 1767
- Completed: 1767
- Demolished: after 1838
- Client: Christ Lutheran Evangelical German Church

The Old Christ Church Lutheran (Old Hollandaise Lutheran Church) was a former Lutheran congregation in North America, located in Washington Heights in Manhattan, New York City, founded in 1750 after breaking off from Trinity Lutheran Church. The two congregations reunited in 1784 as The United German Lutheran Churches in New York City, but still referred to as Christ and old Trinity. The two united congregations began sharing the St. Matthew's Church structure in 1822 while keeping separate names. This continued until the name ceased in 1838 and the congregation was just called the Evangelical Lutheran Church of St. Matthew. The present New York Lutheran church of the same name, Christ Church, was founded much later after the Old Christ Church name was no longer used.

== History ==
German members seceded from the German and Dutch Trinity Lutheran Church in 1750, founding Christ Church after purchasing and adaptively reusing a brewery on Cliff Street as a church. In 1767, the congregation built a church at Frankfort and William Streets, later known as The Old Swamp Church. In 1784, Christ Church Lutheran united with Trinity Lutheran Church as The United German Lutheran Churches in New York City. After the merger, services were held in the former Christ Church building. The Trinity Church had been destroyed in 1776 and was not rebuilt.

An English-language Lutheran church was founded and built in 1822 on Walker Street, at the east end of Broadway, called Saint Matthew's Church. Always in debt, it was sold in 1826 for $22,750 after The United German Lutheran Churches in New York City refused to aid St. Matthew's. Shortly thereafter the building was resold at the same price to The United German Lutheran Churches in New York City, referred to as Christ and old Trinity. The congregation maintained both buildings, with Christ Church speaking German and St. Matthew's Church speaking English. The former Christ Church was sold in 1831 and the congregation met in St. Matthew's until 1838, when the congregation assumed the name St. Matthew's. The former Christ Church building was demolished thereafter.
