= Rye Beach =

Rye Beach may refer to:

United States

- Rye Beach, New Hampshire, in Rockingham County
- Rye Beach (New York), a small beach and resort area in Rye (city), New York, in Westchester County
  - Playland (New York), a historic amusement park that constitutes the primary development at Rye Beach

Australia

- Rye Beach, Victoria, in the town of Rye, Victoria
