= Evangelical Lutheran Church of St. Matthew (New York City) =

Church in Manhattan, New York

St. Matthew's Evangelical Lutheran Church
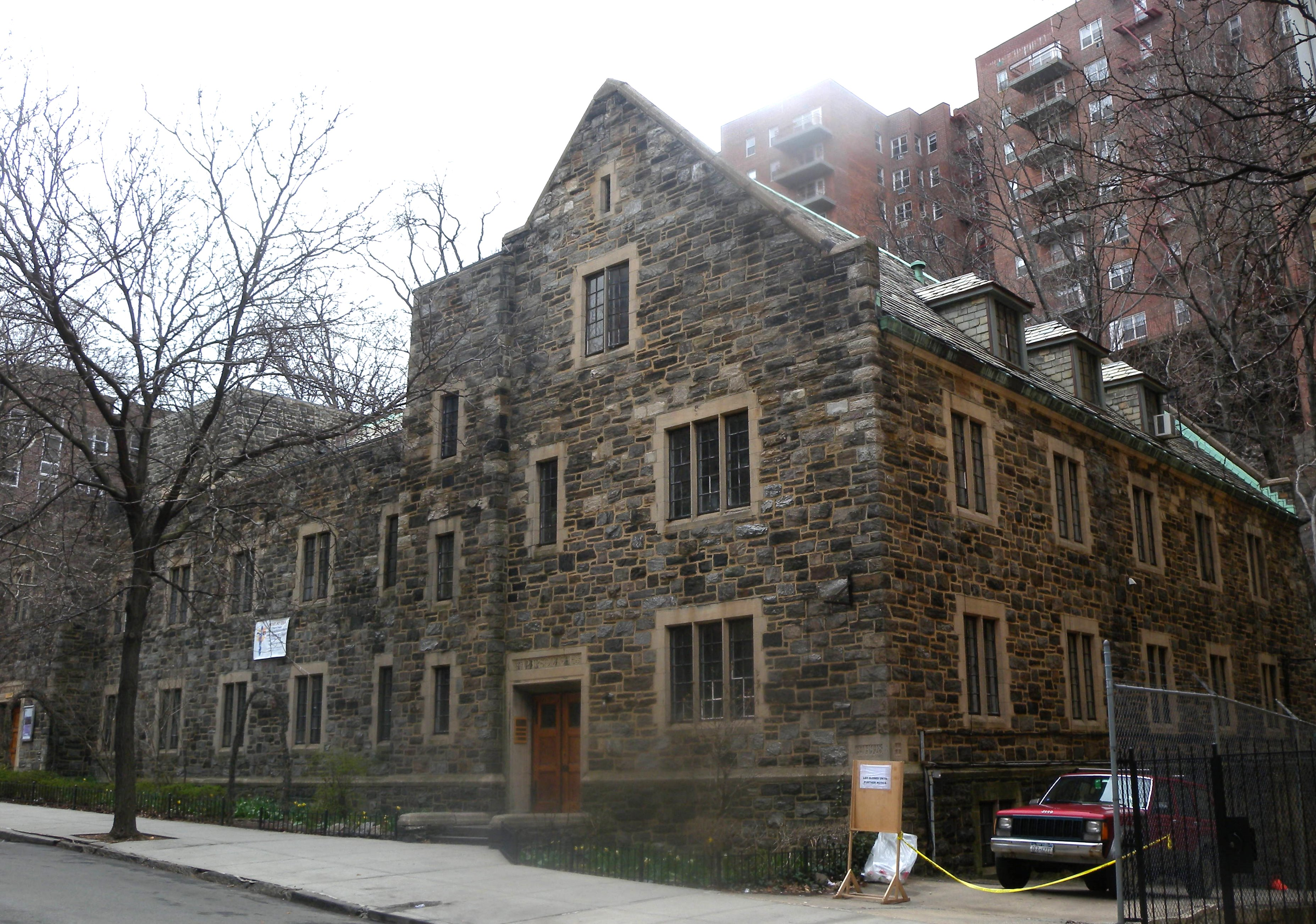
- The congregation has been located at 178 Bennett Avenue since 2006

General information
- Location: Manhattan, New York City, United States of America
- Coordinates: 40°51′21.64″N 73°56′3.8″W
- Construction started: 1671, 1673, 1729, 1767, 1822, 1841, 1847, 1906, 1926, 1956
- Completed: 1671, 1673, 1729, 1767, 1822, 1841, 1847, 1906, 1927, 1957
- Client: St. Matthew's German Lutheran Church

Design and construction
- Architect: John Boese (1903)

The Evangelical Lutheran Church of St. Matthew is the oldest Lutheran congregation in North America. The congregation is a member of the Lutheran Church – Missouri Synod (LCMS). Since 2006, the congregation has been located at the Cornerstone Center, 178 Bennett Avenue in Manhattan, New York City. The congregation has been known by different names, not acquiring the name St. Matthew until 1822 and using it exclusively since 1838.

== History ==
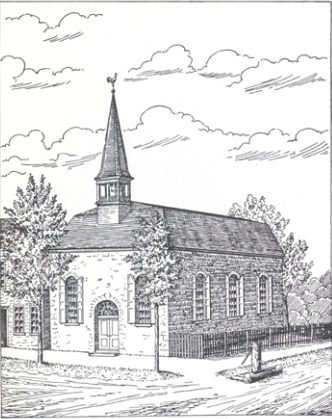
Trinity Church - Lutheran (1729–1776), Broadway, New York City

The congregation was founded in 1643 by Dutch Lutherans in New Amsterdam but the church was not chartered until December 6, 1664, when the new governor, Richard Nicolls, issued a charter after the British had taken control of the colony in April 1664.

The first church building was constructed in 1672 on the present Broadway site of Trinity Episcopal Church, outside the walls of the city. That building was destroyed in 1673, and the congregation constructed a new church to the south of Rector Street and Broadway. This structure was later described as a "cattle shed" and replaced with a new stone edifice known as Trinity Church that was dedicated on June 29, 1729.

German-speaking members seceded from the congregation in 1750 and purchased a brewery on Cliff Street that became Christ Church Lutheran. That year, the Rev. Henry Melchior Muhlenberg began to serve the church, starting a parish school in 1752. Beginning in 1770, Rev. Bernard Michael Houseal served the church for 14 years. His home and Trinity Church were destroyed during the New York Fire of 1776. The church records escaped the fire and the congregation thereafter worshiped in the Cedar Street Scotch Presbyterian Church. In 1784, Houseal escaped New York as a Loyalist. In 1784, Christ Church Lutheran united with Trinity Lutheran Church as the United German Lutheran Churches in New York City. After the merger, services were held in the former Christ Church building at Frankfort and William streets, which had been built in 1767 and was known as The Old Swamp Church.

The congregation was one of the founders of the New York Ministerium in 1786.

An English-language Lutheran church was founded and built in 1822 at the historic 79 and 81 Walker Street, at the east end of Broadway, and named Saint Matthew’s Church. Always in debt, it was sold in 1826 for $22,750 after the United German Lutheran Churches declined to help the church. Shortly thereafter, the building was resold at the same price to the United German Lutheran Churches and the result was referred to as "Christ and Old Trinity". The congregation maintained both buildings, with Christ Church conducting services in German and St. Matthew's Church in English. The Christ Church building was sold in 1831 and the congregation met in St. Matthew's until 1838, when the congregation assumed the name St. Matthew's with predominantly German services. Starting in May 1840, English services were no longer held due to German immigration and the huge turnout for the German services.

Other congregations that branched from St. Matthew's around this time include:

- St. Paul’s German Evangelical Lutheran Church, now located on West 22nd Street, was founded in 1841 by St. Matthew's former pastor.
- St Mark’s Evangelical Lutheran Church was founded in 1847 as a branch church of St. Matthew's. It was subsidized by Trinity, the Old Church.

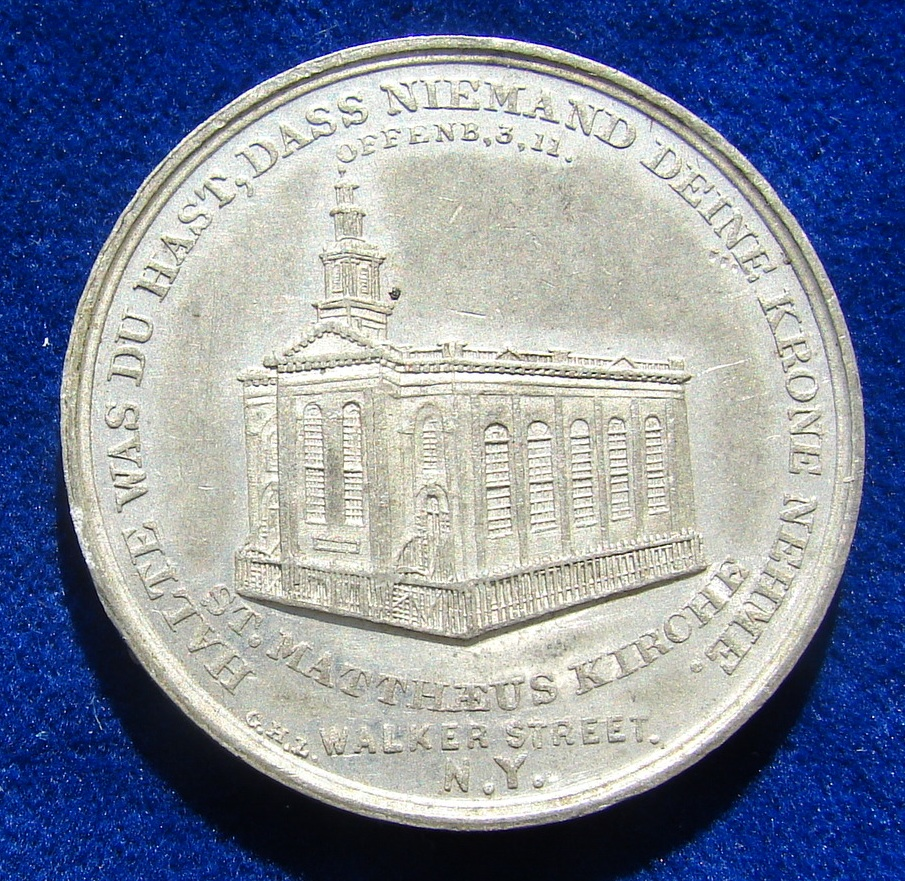
1852 Pewter Medal of the Church of St. Matthew at Walker Street, New York City, obverse

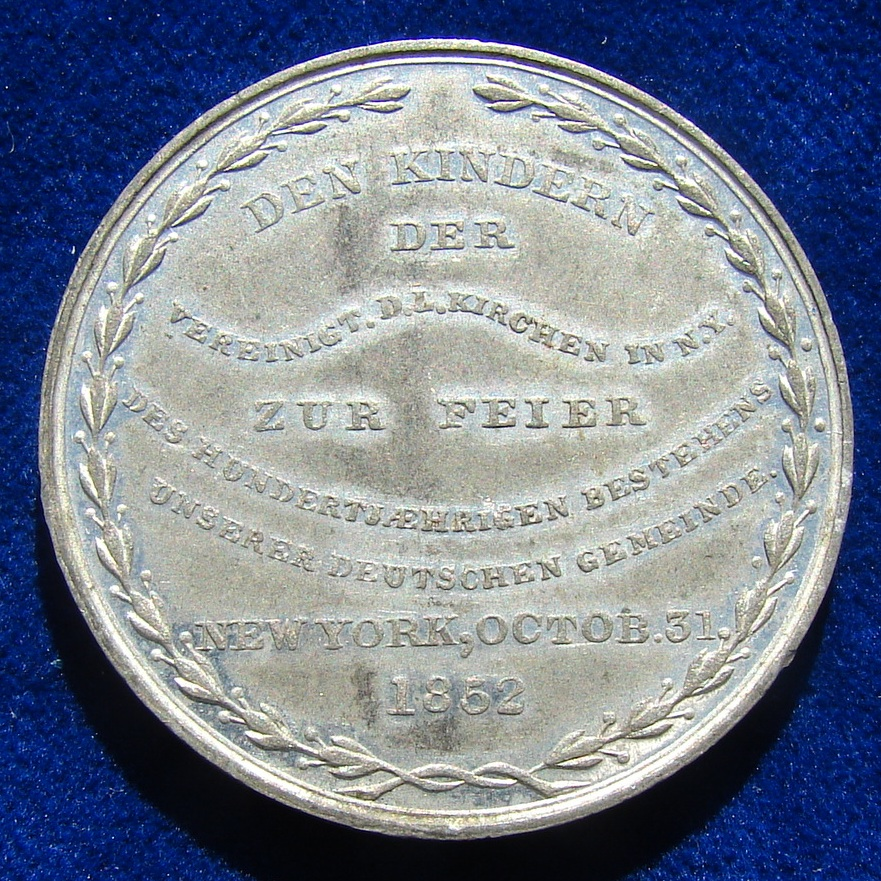
October 31, 1852. Pewter Medal of the 100th Anniversary of the German Evangelical Lutheran Church in New York City

In 1852, the United Lutheran Churches of New York celebrated their 100th Anniversary.

In 1868, St. Matthew's sold its Walker Street church and, as the German Evangelical Lutheran Church of Saint Matthew in the City of New York, acquired the former First Baptist Church at Broome and Elizabeth streets. In 1881, the Concordia Collegiate Institute of the Missouri Synod (subsequently known as Concordia College) was founded at the Broome Street church. St. Matthew's subsidized the institute until the institute moved in 1893 to Hawthorne, New York.

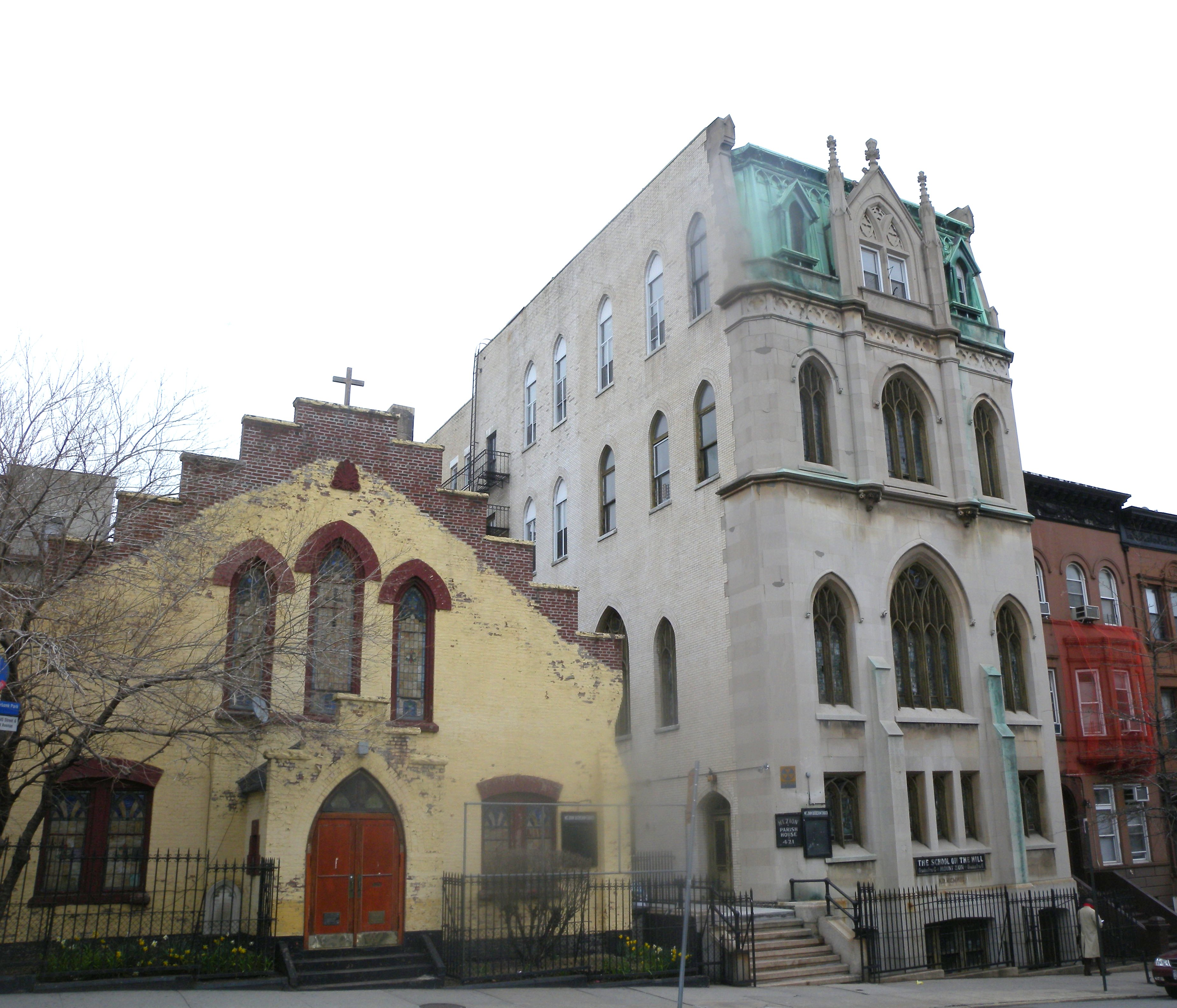
The chapel at 145th Street

In 1885, St. Matthew's left the New York Ministerium to join the more conservative Evangelical Lutheran Synod of Missouri, Ohio, and Other States, now known as the Lutheran Church – Missouri Synod, to which it still belongs.

In 1903, St. Matthew's built a brick and stone church and a three-story residence for $25,000 at 300 West 9th Avenue at 44th Street to designs by architect John Boese of 280 Broadway.

In 1906, St. Matthew erected a mission chapel at 145th Street and Convent Avenue. The Broome Street church closed in 1913 and the congregation moved to the 145th Street and Convent Avenue mission chapel. Nearby at 145th Street and Convent Avenue, the church built a four-story brick and stone parish house in 1908 at a cost of $50,000 to designs by architect John Boese.

St. Matthew's merged in 1945 with Messiah Mission Church in the Inwood, Manhattan, neighborhood and moved into that church building. In 1956, construction of a new church building was begun at 202 Sherman Avenue in Inwood, and completed in 1957. That building was sold in 2006 and demolished along with its elementary school, being replaced by an apartment building. The congregation moved south to the Cornerstone Center on 178 Bennett Avenue.
