= Ford Instrument Company =

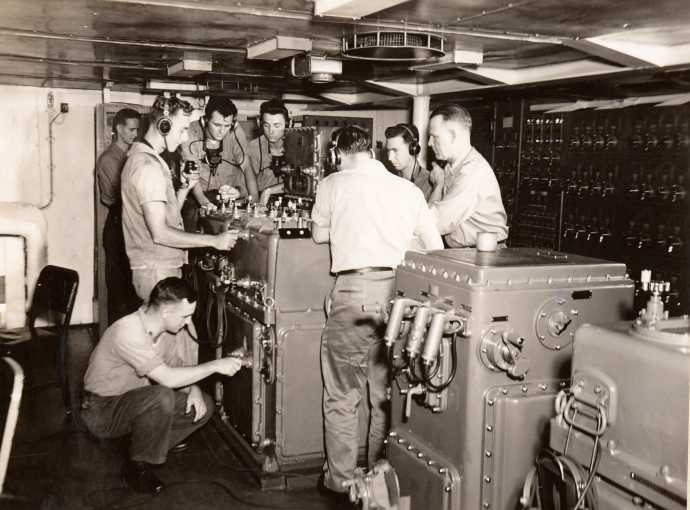
Ford Mk 1 Ballistic Computer. The name rangekeeper began to become inadequate to describe the increasingly complicated functions of rangekeeper. The Mk 1 Ballistic Computer was the first rangekeeper that was referred to as a computer. Note the three pistol grips in the foreground. Those fired the ship's guns.

The Ford Instrument Company was a U.S. corporation known for being the primary supplier of fire control Rangekeepers and analog computers for the United States Navy before and during World War II.

It was founded in 1915 by Hannibal Choate Ford as the Ford Marine Appliance Corporation, later been renamed in 1916 as the Ford Instrument Company. Prior to founding the company Ford had worked closely with Elmer Ambrose Sperry holding the position of Chief Engineer of the Sperry Gyroscope Company.

In 1930 the company was purchased by North American Aviation for $3m, it would subsequently be spun off alone with other non-aviation concerns into Sperry Corporation as part of the purchase of North American by General Motors Corporation who purchased a controlling interest in NAA, and merged it with the General Aviation Manufacturing Corporation.

Ford would thus operate as an independent division of Sperry and later Sperry Rand Corporation.

A personal blog, Doug Coward's Analog History Museum, includes a page with details for the Ford Instrument Company Computer Mark I that was used after 1939 on WW II naval guns up to 5 inch and anti-aircraft guns. (via Wayback Machine) This page has a background stating that the Ford Instrument Company is a subsidiary of Sperry Rand, indicating that the displayed page was supplied by Sperry while operating as Sperry Rand, 1955 and 1978.
