= Lewis House and Medical Office =

Historic house in Minnesota, United States

- U.S. National Register of Historic Places
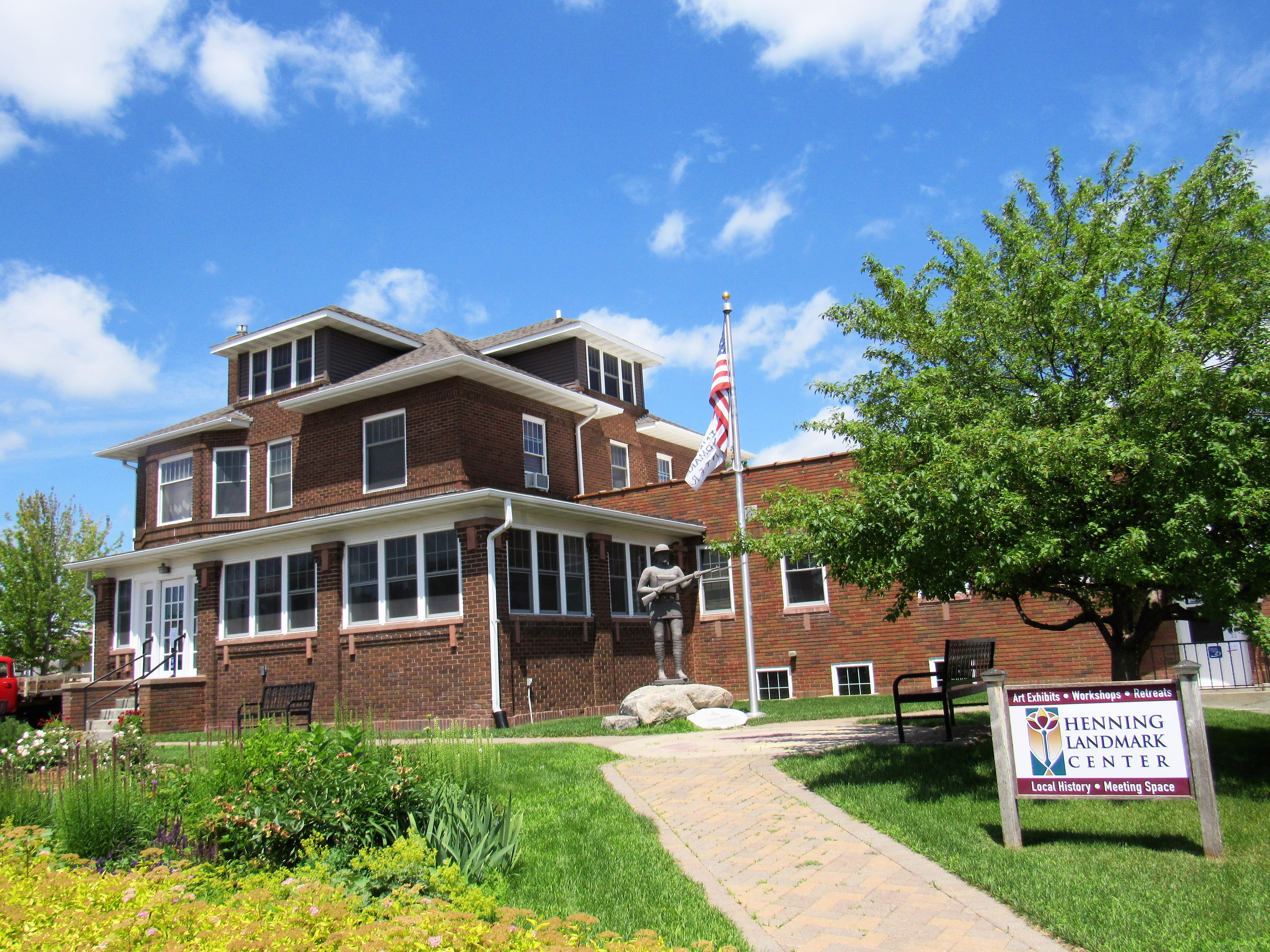

- Location within Minnesota Location within the United States
- Location: 415 Douglas Ave. Henning, Minnesota
- Coordinates: 46°19′18.9″N 95°26′43.5″W
- Area: less than one acre
- Built: 1914, 1948
- Architectural style: Prairie School; Modern
- NRHP reference No.: 100007309
- Added to NRHP: December 29, 2021

Lewis House and Medical Office, also known as the Henning Landmark Center, is a historic building located in Henning, Minnesota, United States. It is significant because of its association with rural medicine in the 20th century. Dr. A.J. Lewis acquired the property in 1911 from Dr. McCoy, whose practice he presumably took over. Lewis and his wife Clara moved into the house and he saw patients there. They built the present two-story, brick, Prairie School residence in 1914 on the same property. Once this house was completed the old house was moved to a different lot in town. Lewis continued to see patients in his residence in addition to making house calls. The porch was enclosed in 1928 after Dr. James Vail was added to the practice. Vail left to join the United States Navy in 1942. Four years later, A.J. and Clara's son, Dr. Charles Lewis, joined the practice. When Dr. Jay Kevern joined the Lewis' in 1948, the Modern-style addition was completed. Kevern provided ophthalmology services and Dr. Vernon Johnson had a dental practice on the lower level. The facility became a multi-discipline medical practice. The medical doctors here also had privileges at the hospital in Wadena, Minnesota. Dr. A.J. Lewis continued to practice medicine here until he died in 1962. His wife Clara died in 1984.

Dr. Charles Lewis sold the practice and house to Dr. Jon Wigert, who lived here and continued the practice until 1990 when Tri-County Hospital in Wadena built a new medical facility a block away. The Espeland family provided the funds to buy and renovate this facility for the City of Henning. The Landmark Center opened in 2009. Meetings, retreats, and other functions are held on the main floor of the residence and the second-floor bedrooms are used for over-night accommodations. The 1948 addition houses offices, meeting space, and a museum. The building was added to the National Register of Historic Places in 2021. A two-stall garage (c. 1920) is also a part of the historic designation.

== Henning Landmark Center ==
The Henning Landmark Center was opened in 2009 after extensive restoration and functions both as a community arts facility and local history museum. The center hosts a variety of arts programs, including workshops in ceramics, woodworking, painting, blacksmithing, textiles, writing, and glass blowing. Its museum space features exhibits on regional history and preserves the building’s legacy as a hub for rural healthcare, while its gallery and meeting areas accommodate changing art displays, community events, and educational programs.
