= Berkley, Virginia =

- Berkley North Historic District
- U.S. National Register of Historic Places
- U.S. Historic district
- Virginia Landmarks Register
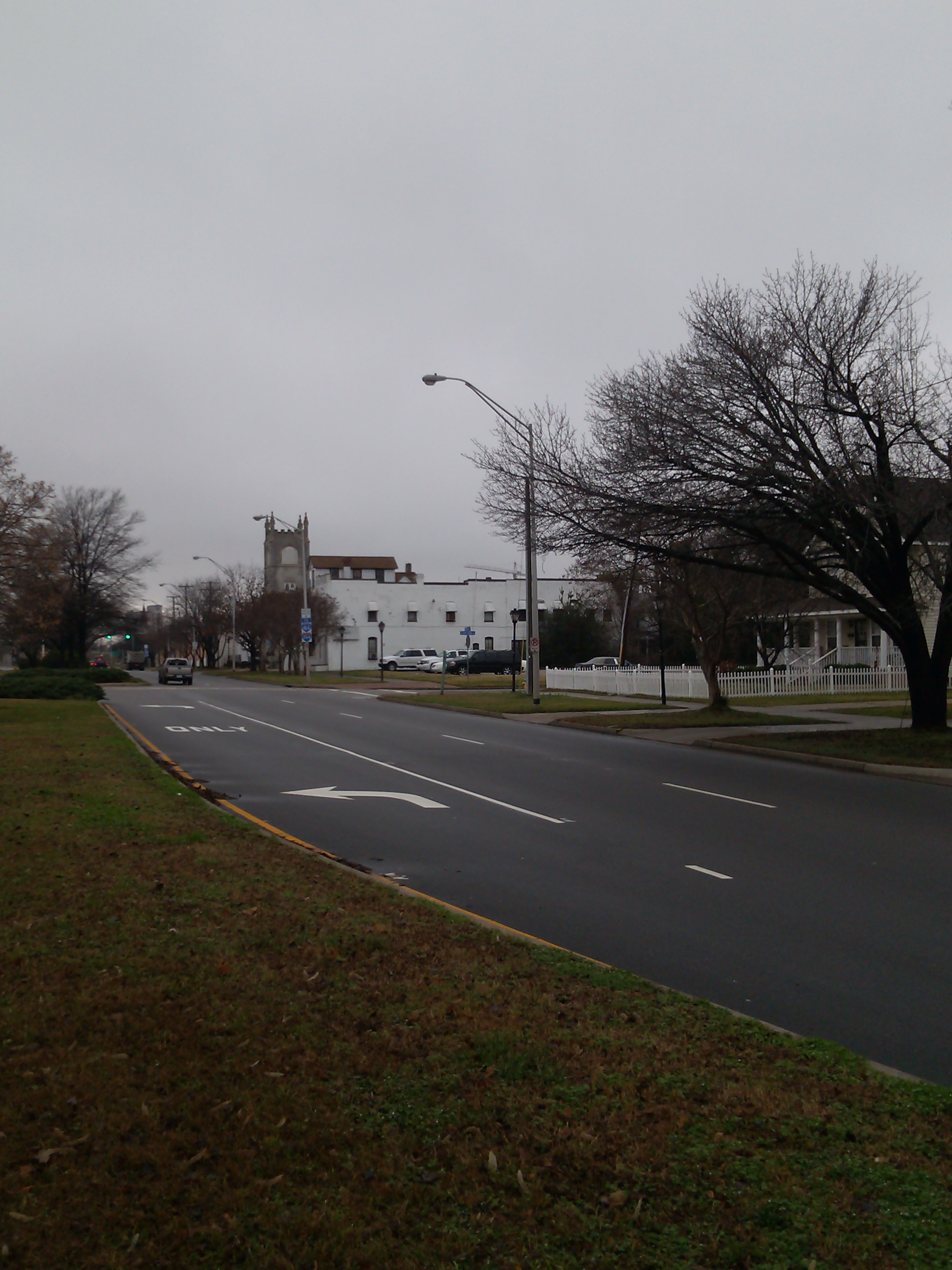

- Location within Virginia Location within the United States
- Location: Roughly bounded by Bellamy Ave., Pescara Creek, Berkley Ave., and I-464, Norfolk, Virginia
- Coordinates: 36°50′05″N 76°16′55″W
- Area: 86 acres (35 ha)
- Built: 1890
- Architect: Volk, L.B.; et al.
- Architectural style: Mid 19th Century Revival, Late Victorian, et al.
- NRHP reference No.: 00001440; 100011698 (decrease)
- VLR No.: 122-0824

Significant dates
- Added to NRHP: November 22, 2000
- Boundary decrease: April 15, 2025
- Designated VLR: December 1, 1999

Berkley was an incorporated town in Norfolk County, Virginia. Chartered by an Act of Assembly in 1890, the Town of Berkley was located directly across the Eastern Branch Elizabeth River from the City of Norfolk in the South Hampton Roads area.

== History ==
In the 18th century, Berkley developed port facilities and a shipyard on the Elizabeth River across from Norfolk. In the 19th century, it was the rail terminus of the original Norfolk Southern Railway, a regional railroad extending 600 miles to Charlotte, North Carolina (and a predecessor of the modern Norfolk Southern rail system headquartered in Norfolk).

Both the Town of Berkley and Norfolk County are extinct as jurisdictions. Fearing annexation ambitions by its larger neighbor, the City of Norfolk, in the late 19th century, the town leaders petitioned the Virginia General Assembly to become an independent city (which would have created immunity from annexation), but the effort failed. On January 1, 1906, the Town of Berkley was annexed by the City of Norfolk, and is now considered a neighborhood of that city. (Remaining portions of Norfolk County were consolidated with the City of South Norfolk in 1963 to form the City of Chesapeake).

On 13 April 1922, the "negro belt" of the city suffered a large fire that destroyed two hundred homes. Press reports said that the fire began in a lumber mill and spread rapidly.

In the 21st century, the Berkley Bridge on I-264 links Berkley with the downtown area of Norfolk. It is one of a few drawbridges on the Interstate Highway System. Berkley also is the site of the juncture of the Downtown Tunnel (across the river to Portsmouth) and Interstate 464 (leading to Chesapeake).

== Berkley North Historic District ==
The Berkley North Historic District was listed on the National Register of Historic Places in 2000. It encompasses 255 contributing buildings in one of southeast Virginia's oldest and most diverse communities, now part of the City of Norfolk. It includes a variety of early-20th century commercial and residential architecture, some of it designed by the area's most important firms. Notable buildings include the Lycurgus Berkley House (c. 1873), Norfleet House (1900), St. James Episcopal Church and adjacent chapel, Antioch Baptist church, Berkley Avenue Baptist Church (1885-1888), Merchants' and Planters' Bank, Seaboard Bank Building (1921), former Memorial Methodist Episcopal Church, and the Mary Hardy MacArthur Memorial.

== People from Berkley ==
- Peggy Hopkins Joyce (May 26, 1893–June 12, 1957), Broadway actress and New York City socialite, was born in Berkley.
- Mary Pinkney Hardy "Pinky" MacArthur (May 22, 1852–December 3, 1935), wife of United States Army Lieutenant General Arthur MacArthur, Jr. and mother of General of the Army Douglas MacArthur, was born, raised and married at her Hardy family plantation, "Riveredge", in Berkley. A memorial to her stands at the north end of South Main Street, near the former site of the mansion.
- William Henry Lewis (November 28, 1868 - January 1, 1949), the first African American appointed as an Assistant US Attorney (in Boston) and the first African-American US Assistant Attorneys General. Born to freedmen parents, he grew up in Berkley and went North to complete college, where he played football, and received his law degree.
- Kenneth Cooper Alexander (born October 17, 1966, in Norfolk, Virginia and grew up in the Berkley area), an American politician of the Democratic Party. From 2002 - 2012, he served in the Virginia House of Delegates; he was elected in 2012 to the Senate of Virginia., and since 2016, is the Mayor of Norfolk.
- Minnie Madrey (1912-2001) late civic leader and activist of Berkley.
- Rev. Dr. Jake Manley, Sr. (1924-2013), pastor of the Bethany Baptist Church (South Norfolk) and community leader. The church he pastored was founded in Berkley, before relocating to South Norfolk area of Chesapeake.

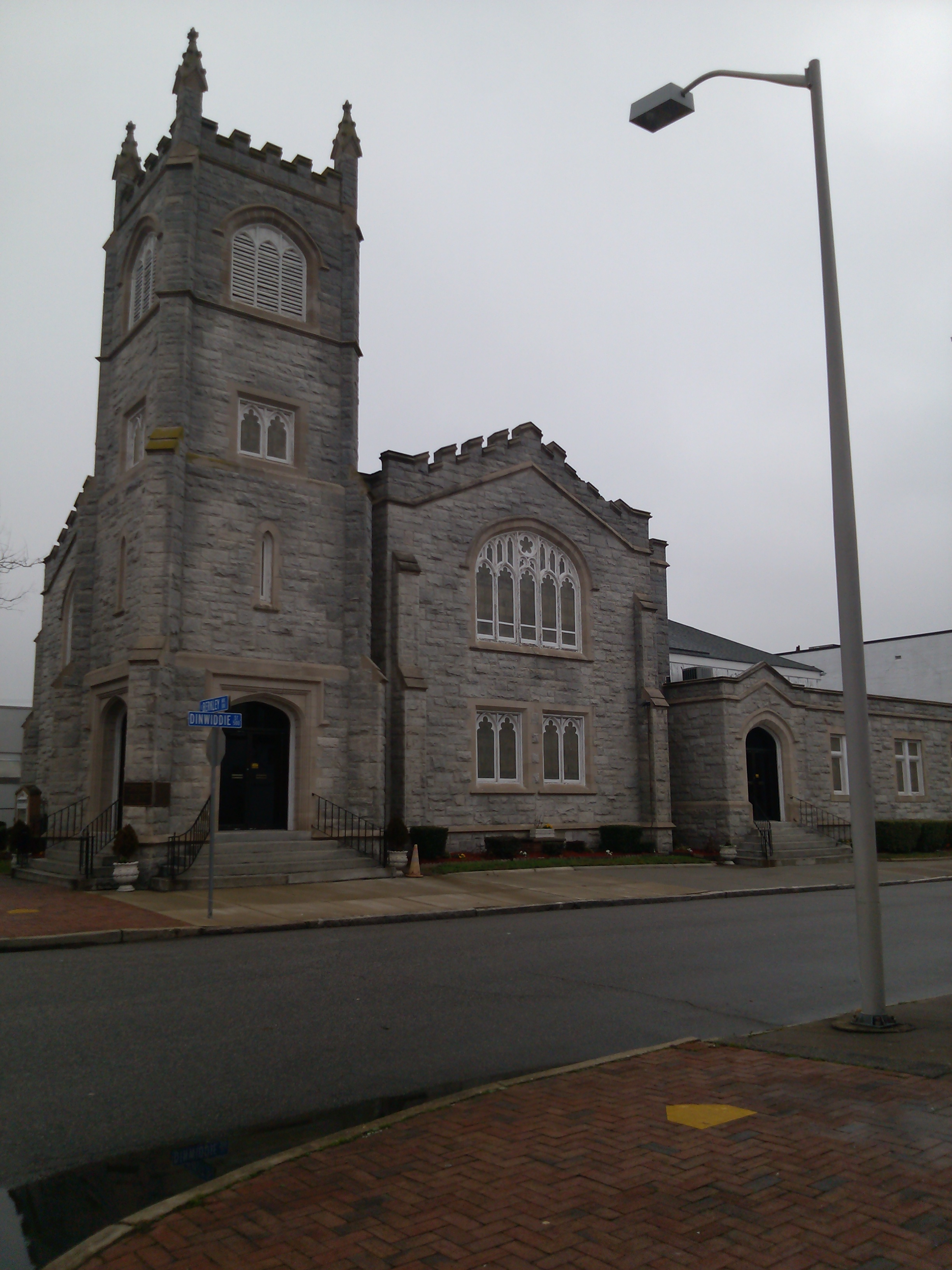
former Memorial Methodist Church designed 1899-1900, now Antioch Baptist Church on Berkley Avenue and Dinwiddie St.

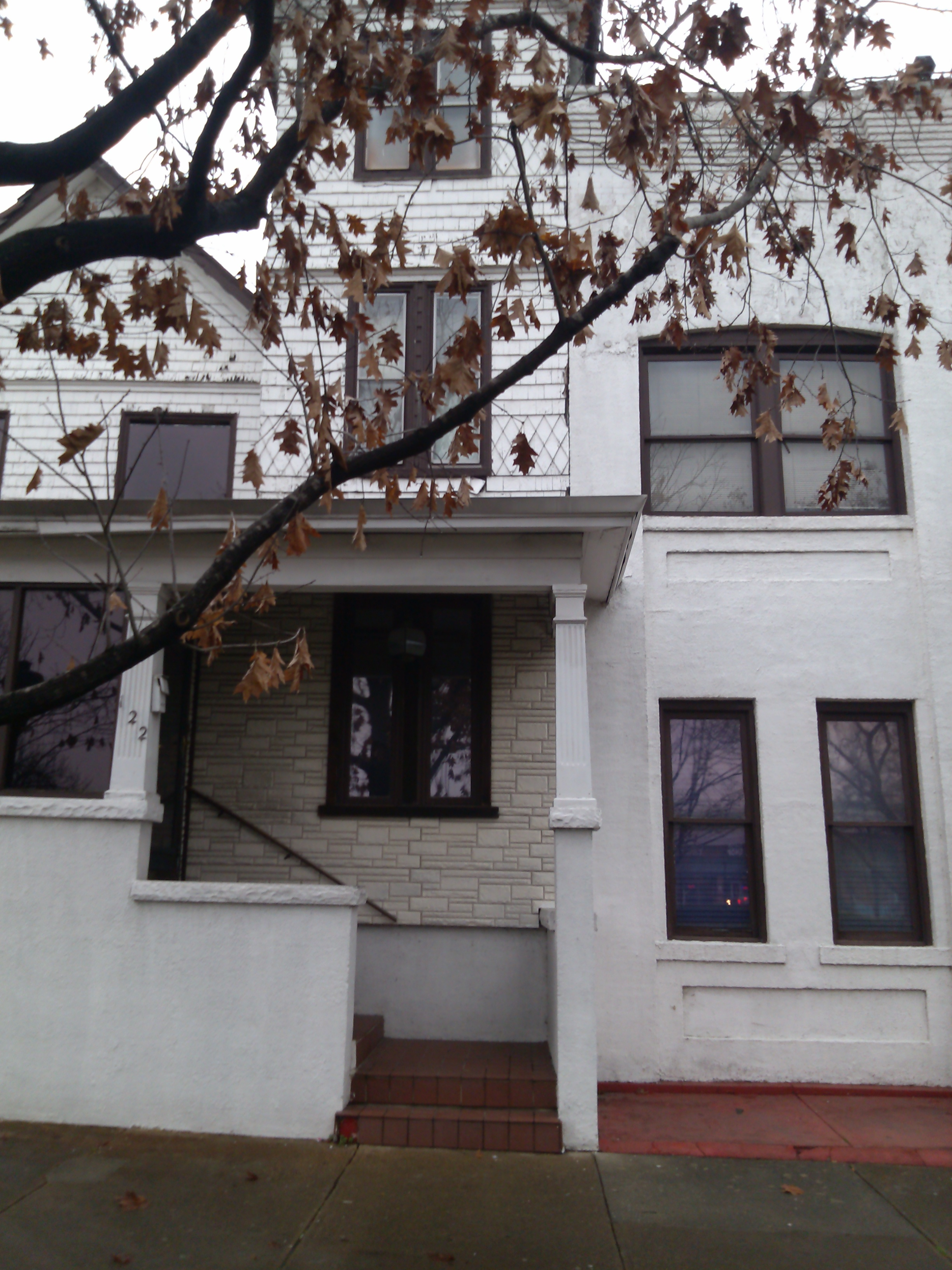
Location of old metropolitan funeral home built in 1888.
