= John Boese =

American architect

- Known for: Architect

John Boese, AIA, (pronounced BOW-SE) was a minor American architect practicing in New York City in the late nineteenth and early twentieth century. Little of his work is known. His office was located at 280 Broadway.

He is best known as the architect of The German Evangelical Lutheran Church of St. Matthew, 145th Street and Convent Ave

== Works ==
- 1900: Charlotte Dochtermann Warehouse, 11 East 2nd Street, a six-storey brick warehouse, for $18,000 Apparently demolished.
- 1903: The Reformed Protestant Dutch Church of the City of New York, 45th st, s s, 150 West Ninth Avenue, two and three-storey brick and stone church and residential structure, for $25,000 Demolished.
- 1903: The Broome Street German Evangelical Lutheran Church of St. Matthew Parish House, 300 West Ninth Avenue and 44th Street, three-storey brick and stone church and school, for $25,000 Demolished.
- 1904: Grand Union Hotel kitchen extension, 200 East Park Avenue, 41st Street Single-storey kitchen extension for brick hotel for Simeon Ford and Samuel T Shaw of 41-43 West 74th Street, for $7,000
- 1905: Grand Union Hotel, 114-116 East 42nd Street, single-storey brick and stone refrigerator house for brick hotel for Simeon Ford and Samuel T Shaw (formerly of 41-43 W 74th Street, now of Hollis, Long Island, for $600 Demolished.
- 1908: The Broome Street German Evangelical Lutheran Church of St. Matthew Parish House, 145th Street and Convent Ave, a four-storey brick and stone parish house, for $50,000 Demolished.
- 1909: Grand Union Hotel, two-storey brick stores for Simeon Ford and Samuel T Shaw for $3,500 Demolished.
