= Chapel of Free Grace (New York City) =

Demolished chapel in Manhattan, New York

Coordinates: 40°44′2.72″N 73°58′46.73″W

The (former) Chapel of Free Grace
- Interactive map of the The (former) Chapel of Free Grace area

General information
- Architectural style: Gothic Revival architecture
- Location: New York, New York, United States of America
- Completed: 1859
- Client: St. George's Episcopal Church

Technical details
- Structural system: masonry

The former Chapel of Free Grace was a former mission chapel built in 1859 by St. George's Episcopal Church. Located at 406 East 19th Street in Manhattan, New York City, it was a gable-fronted steeply pitched masonry Gothic Revival church with a gable rose window. The Evangelical Lutheran Church of Christ (founded 1868) purchased the church building in 1882. The 19th Street building remained the Lutheran congregation's home until it was demolished in 1948 during the development of Stuyvesant Town by Metropolitan Life Insurance.
