= Henning, Minnesota =

City in Minnesota, United States

Henning
- City
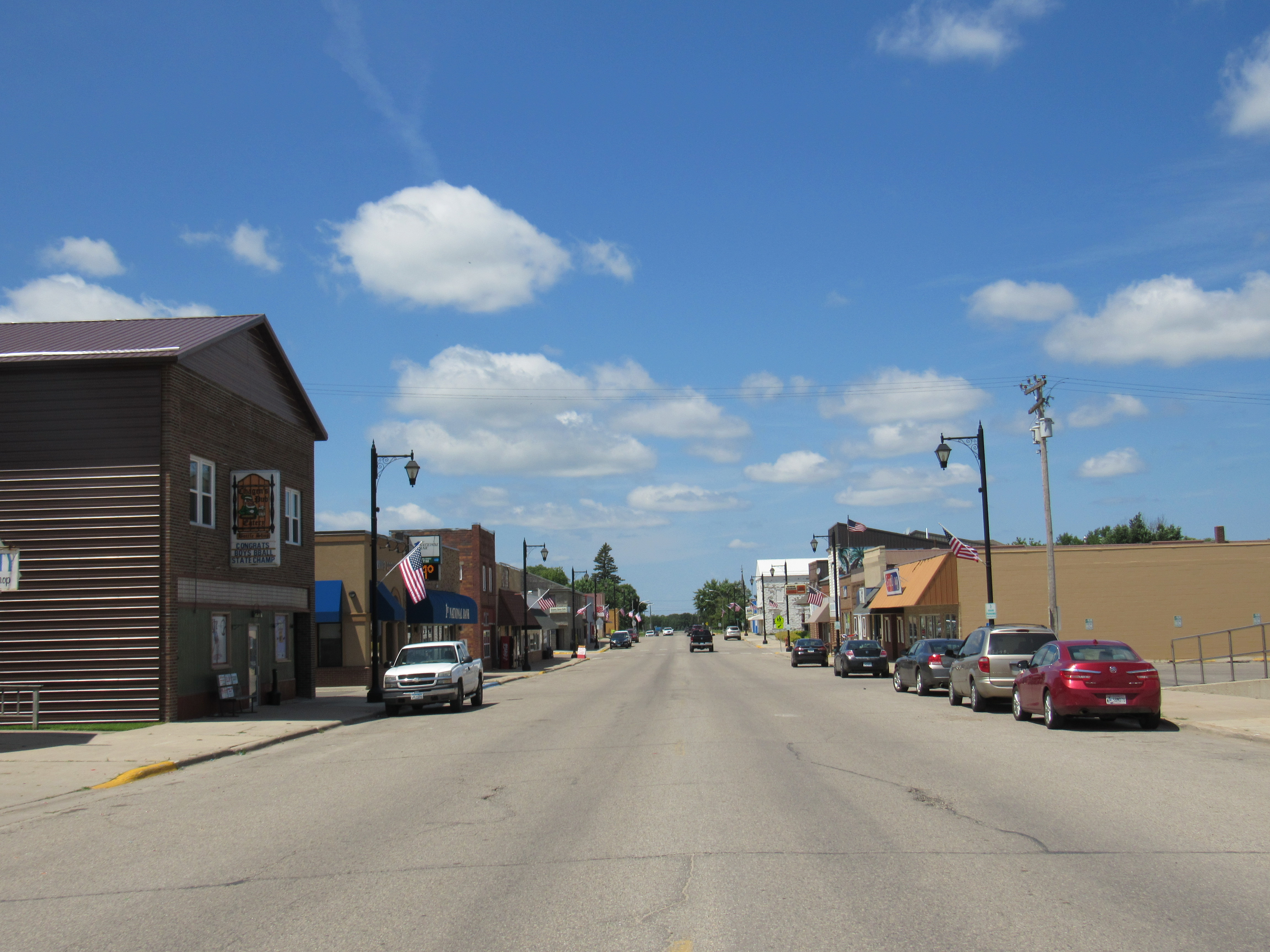

- Location of Henning, Minnesota
- Coordinates: 46°19′24″N 95°26′32″W
- Country: United States
- State: Minnesota
- County: Otter Tail
- Incorporated: 1887

Area
  - Total: 3.34 sq mi (8.66 km^{2})
  - Land: 3.31 sq mi (8.56 km^{2})
  - Water: 0.042 sq mi (0.11 km^{2})
- Elevation: 1,437 ft (438 m)

Population (2020)
  - Total: 854
  - Estimate (2021): 860
  - Density: 258.5/sq mi (99.82/km^{2})
- Time zone: UTC-6 (CST)
  - Summer (DST): UTC-5 (CDT)
- ZIP code: 56551
- Area code: 218
- FIPS code: 27-28520
- GNIS feature ID: 2394352
- Website: cityofhenning.com

Henning is a city in Otter Tail County, Minnesota, United States. The population was 854 at the 2020 census.

== History ==
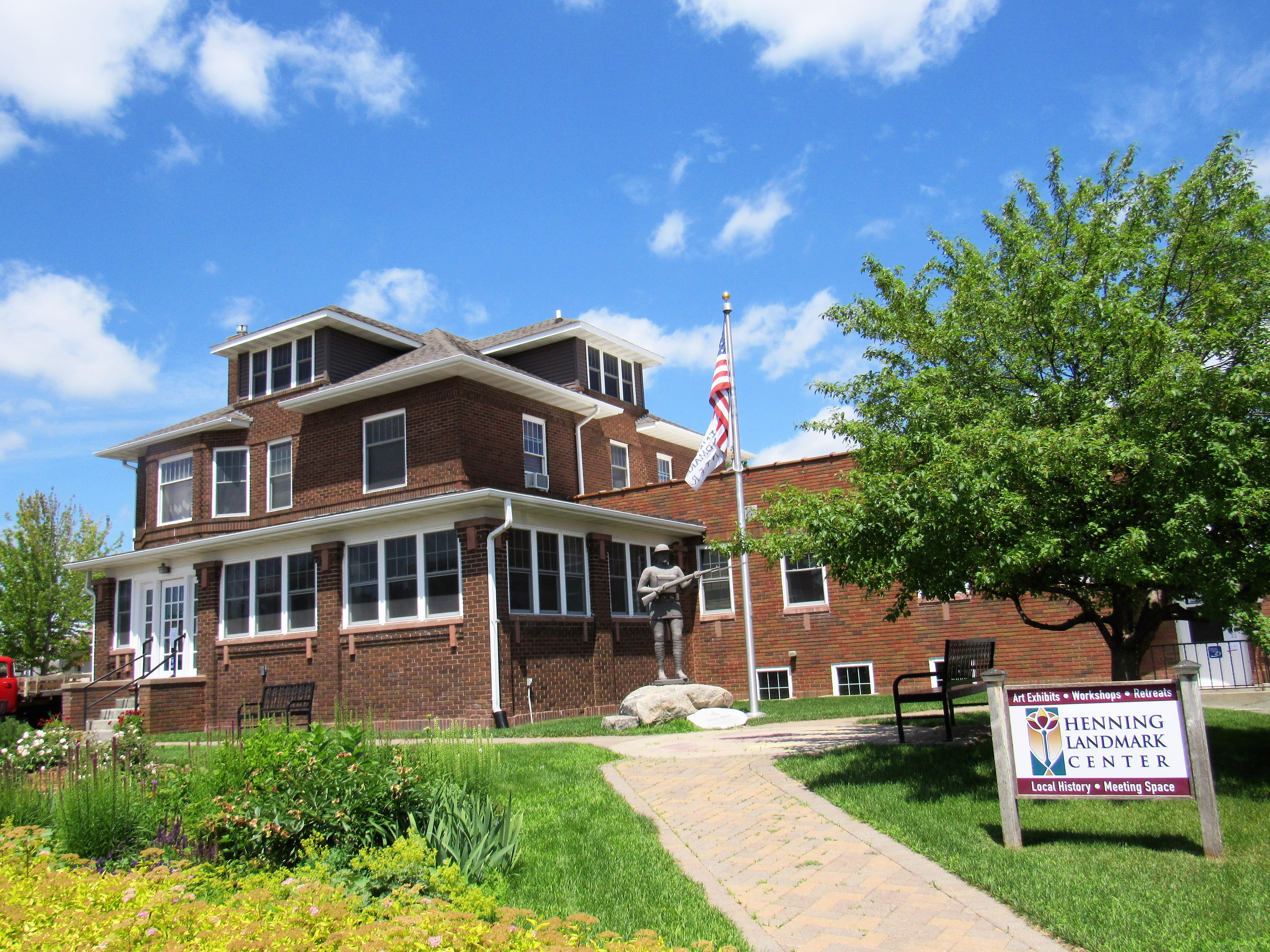
The Henning Landmark Center functions both as a community arts facility and local history museum

Henning was incorporated in 1887, and named for John O. Henning, a pharmacist.

== Geography ==
According to the United States Census Bureau, the city has a total area of 3.38 square miles (8.75 km^{2}), of which 3.34 square miles (8.65 km^{2}) is land and 0.04 square miles (0.10 km^{2}) is water.

Minnesota State Highways 108 and 210 are two of the main routes in the community, and Minnesota State Highway 29 is nearby.

== Demographics ==
Historical population
Census	Pop.	Note	%±
1890	254		—
1900	645		153.9%
1910	603		−6.5%
1920	755		25.2%
1930	731		−3.2%
1940	948		29.7%
1950	1,004		5.9%
1960	980		−2.4%
1970	850		−13.3%
1980	832		−2.1%
1990	738		−11.3%
2000	719		−2.6%
2010	802		11.5%
2020	854		6.5%
2021 (est.)	860		0.7%
U.S. Decennial Census; 2020 Census

=== 2010 census ===
As of the census of 2010, there were 802 people, 364 households, and 181 families living in the city. The population density was 240.1 inhabitants per square mile (92.7/km^{2}). There were 438 housing units at an average density of 131.1 per square mile (50.6/km^{2}). The racial makeup of the city was 97.0% White, 0.2% African American, 0.1% Native American, 1.2% Asian, 0.1% from other races, and 1.2% from two or more races. Hispanic or Latino of any race were 0.7% of the population.

There were 364 households, of which 22.3% had children under the age of 18 living with them, 40.9% were married couples living together, 6.6% had a female householder with no husband present, 2.2% had a male householder with no wife present, and 50.3% were non-families. 47.0% of all households were made up of individuals, and 32.1% had someone living alone who was 65 years of age or older. The average household size was 2.10 and the average family size was 3.03.

The median age in the city was 50.1 years. 21.2% of residents were under the age of 18; 5.4% were between the ages of 18 and 24; 18.8% were from 25 to 44; 22.4% were from 45 to 64; and 32.2% were 65 years of age or older. The gender makeup of the city was 46.0% male and 54.0% female.

=== 2000 census ===
As of the census of 2000, there were 719 people, 366 households, and 181 families living in the city. The population density was 232.4 inhabitants per square mile (89.7/km^{2}). There were 406 housing units at an average density of 131.2 per square mile (50.7/km^{2}). The racial makeup of the city was 98.19% White, 0.42% Native American and 1.39% Asian.

There were 366 households, out of which 19.4% had children under the age of 18 living with them, 41.5% were married couples living together, 5.2% had a female householder with no husband present, and 50.5% were non-families. 48.1% of all households were made up of individuals, and 33.6% had someone living alone who was 65 years of age or older. The average household size was 1.95 and the average family size was 2.80.

In the city, the population was spread out, with 19.5% under the age of 18, 7.0% from 18 to 24, 18.8% from 25 to 44, 21.7% from 45 to 64, and 33.1% who were 65 years of age or older. The median age was 49 years. For every 100 females, there were 80.7 males. For every 100 females age 18 and over, there were 77.1 males.

The median income for a household in the city was $21,944, and the median income for a family was $31,932. Males had a median income of $30,417 versus $20,972 for females. The per capita income for the city was $15,450. Below the poverty line were 19.0% of people, 8.1% of families, 19.7% of those under 18 and 27.0% of those over 64.

== See also ==
- Lewis House and Medical Office, listed on the National Register of Historic Places
- Trinity Lutheran Church (Henning, Minnesota), listed on the National Register of Historic Places
