= Jamaica Chamber of Commerce Building =

Historic commercial building in Queens, New York

- U.S. National Register of Historic Places
- New York City Landmark
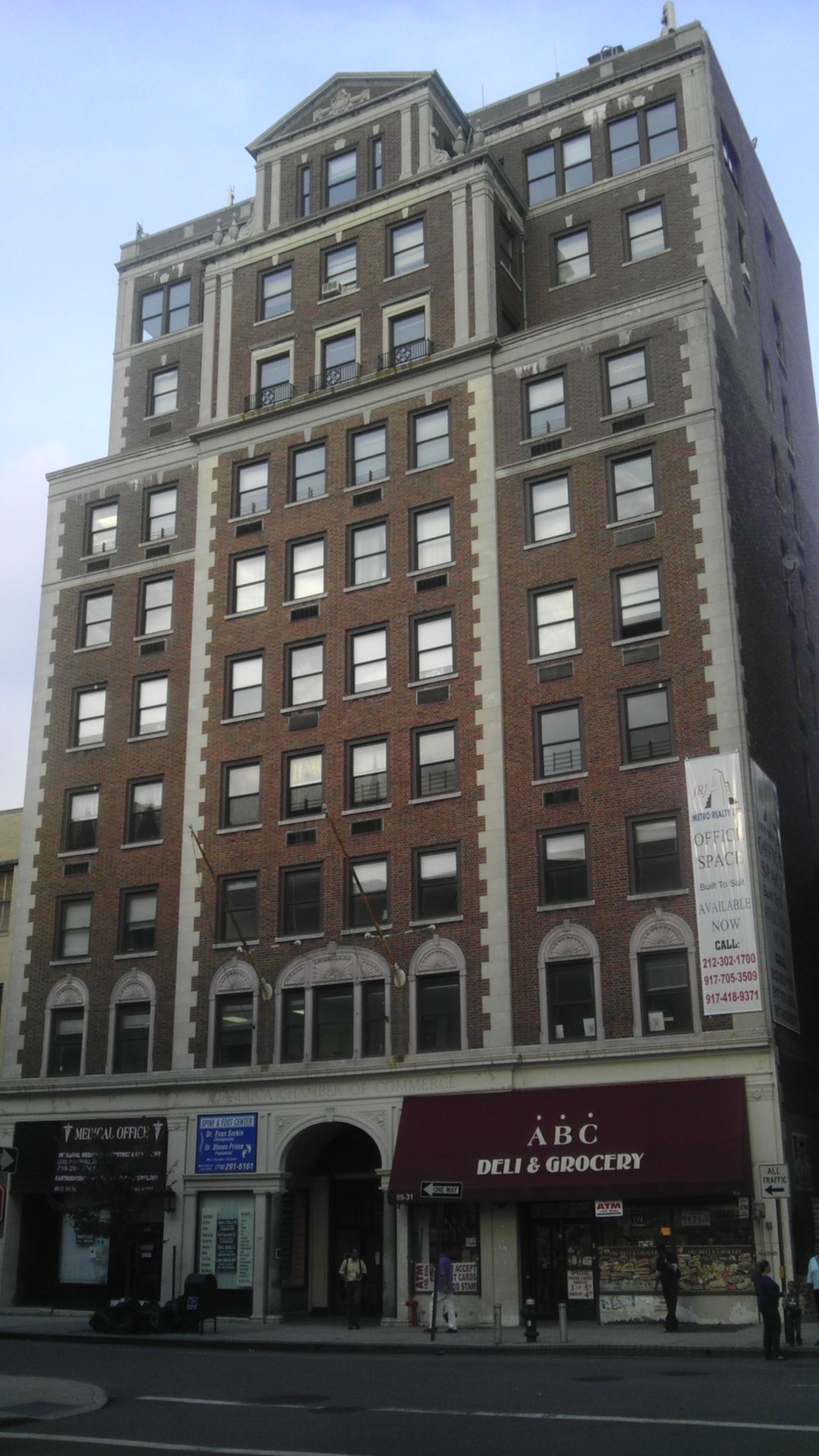

- Location within New York City Location within New York Location within the United States
- Location: 8931 161st St., New York, New York
- Coordinates: 40°42′20″N 73°47′57″W
- Area: 1 acre (0.40 ha)
- Built: 1928
- Architect: Conable, George W.
- Architectural style: Colonial Revival
- NRHP reference No.: 83001773
- NYCL No.: 2386

Significant dates
- Added to NRHP: September 8, 1983
- Designated NYCL: October 26, 2010

Jamaica Chamber of Commerce Building is a historic office building located in the Jamaica section of the New York City borough of Queens. It was designed in 1928 by George W. Conable (1866-1933) and is a ten-story, T-shaped building in the Colonial Revival style.

George W. Conable designed the building's facade based on 19th-century American and British precedents. It is a steel-frame building faced in red brick and trimmed in stone and terra cotta detail. It has tripartite massing with a one-story terra cotta base, six story section, and stepped back eighth and ninth stories. The top story is a one-story pedimented temple.

It was listed on the National Register of Historic Places in 1983.

== See also ==
- List of New York City Designated Landmarks in Queens
- National Register of Historic Places listings in Queens County, New York
