= George W. Conable =

American architect

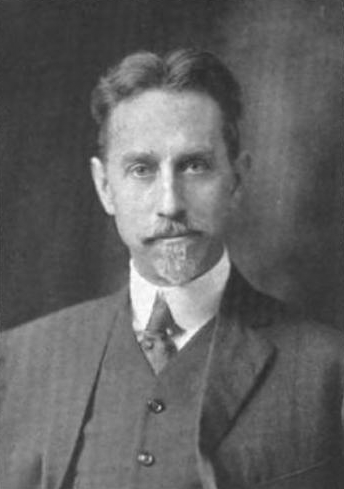
- Born: George Willard Conable; October 4, 1866; Cortland, New York
- Died: Tampa, Florida; January 2, 1933 (aged 66)
- Education: Cortland State Normal School; Cornell University
- Occupation: Architect

George Willard Conable (1866-1933), AIA, was an American architect practicing in New York City in the early to mid 20th century specializing in churches.

== Biography ==
George W. Conable was born in Cortland, New York on October 4, 1866. He graduated from Cortland State Normal School in 1886, and from Cornell University in 1890.

In 1905 he was an assistant to noted architect Ernest Flagg and prepared plans and working drawings for the Singer Building. His office was at 15 Myrtle Avenue, Jamaica, Queens in 1908, 46 West 24th Street in 1918. He entered into a brief partnership with Hobart Upjohn as the firm of Upjohn & Conable of 96 Fifth Avenue, New York, in 1911. He is best known as the architect of Holy Trinity Lutheran Church (New York City) (1908) and Messiah Evangelical Lutheran Church (1926)

He died in Tampa, Florida on January 2, 1933.

== Works as George W. Conable ==
- 1908: German Evangelical Lutheran Church of 164 West 100th Street, 90 East Amsterdam Ave and 100th Street, a two-story brick and stone church and parsonage for $50,000
- 1916: Queensboro Hospital for Contagious Diseases, Parsons Boulevard and Grand Central Parkway in Jamaica, Queens.
- 1918: 179-181 West Houston Street, single-storey office, for Congress Warehouse & Forwarding Co.; J. L Wolff, Pres of 474 West Broadway, for $5,000
- 1919: 179-83 West Houston Street, single-storey brick garage, for Congress Warehouse & Forwarding Co.; J. L Wolff, Pres of 474 West Broadway, for $5,000
- 1923: South Hall (now Parker Hall) on the campus of Wagner College in Staten Island NY
- 1926: Messiah Evangelical Lutheran Church, 198-200 Sherman Avenue, two-story brick school and chapel for $40,000
- 1926: Trinity Lutheran Church (Queens, New York), overseer for architect John William Cresswell Corbusier, listed on the National Register of Historic Places in 2008.
- 1928: Jamaica Chamber of Commerce Building, listed on the National Register of Historic Places in 1983.
- 1929: Main Hall on the campus of Wagner College in Staten Island, NY.

== Works as Upjohn & Conable ==
- 1909: Rye Town Park-Bathing Complex and Oakland Beach, added to the National Register of Historic Places in 2003.
- 1911: a brick and stone fence rear of brick residence, 546 West 153rd Street for Washington Heights Evangelical Lutheran Church of 546 West 153rd Street for $250
- 1914: Trinity Lutheran Church, Staten Island, NY
