= Trinity Lutheran Church (Henning, Minnesota) =

Historic church in Minnesota, United States

- U.S. National Register of Historic Places
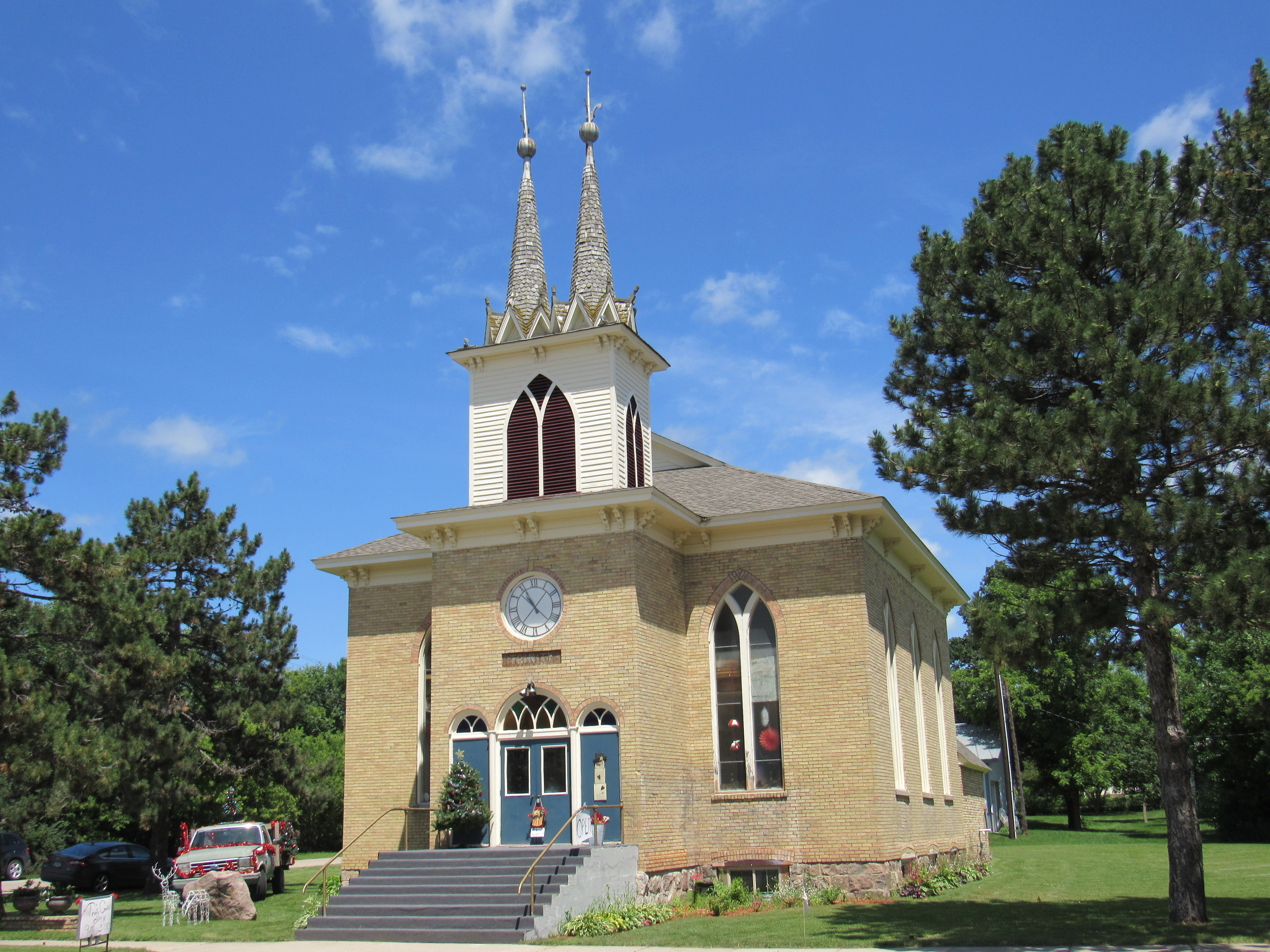

- Location within Minnesota Location within the United States
- Location: 301 Douglas Ave. Henning, Minnesota
- Coordinates: 46°19′23.7″N 95°26′52.7″W
- Area: less than one acre
- Built: 1898
- Architectural style: Gothic Revival
- NRHP reference No.: 100002504
- Added to NRHP: July 27, 2018

Trinity Lutheran Church, is a historic church building located in Henning, Minnesota, United States. The Lutheran congregation was established in 1878. The brick Gothic Revival church was built in 1898. The twin spires on top of the central tower is a unique feature of the building. It was also one of the first structures built in town. Two other Lutheran congregations were founded in the area in the late 19th-century, Norderhaug Norwegian Evangelical Lutheran Church (Leaf Lake Church) in 1887, and United Lutheran Church in 1896. Those two congregations merged in 1957 and Trinity joined them ten years later, forming Good Shepherd Lutheran Church. St. Edward's Catholic Church acquired the Trinity church building shortly after that. They moved to a new building in 2002 and sold the old church.

The city bought the tax-forfeited building from Otter Tail County. A group called Save the Trinity was organized in 2015 and is involved in renovating the former church, which had fallen into disrepair. The building was added to the National Register of Historic Places in 2018. It now hosts a variety of community events.
