= Rye Town Park-Bathing Complex and Oakland Beach =

- U.S. National Register of Historic Places
- New York State Register of Historic Places
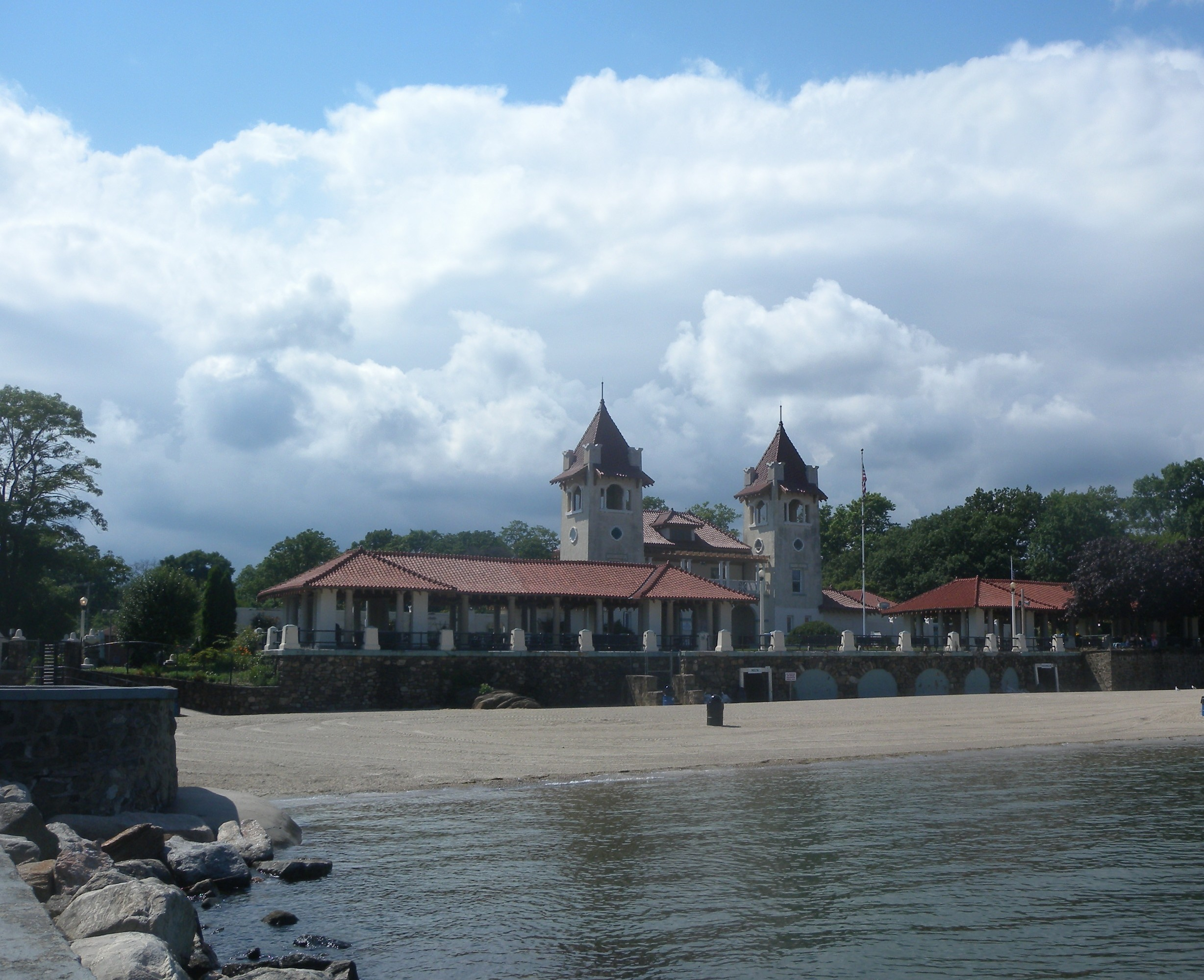

- Location within New York Location within the United States
- Location: Forrest Ave., bet. Rye Beach and Dearborn Ave., Rye City, New York
- Coordinates: 40°57′39″N 73°40′45″W
- Area: 62.6 acres (25.3 ha)
- Built: 1909-1925
- Architect: Upjohn & Conable; Brinley & Holbrook
- Architectural style: Mission/Spanish Revival
- NRHP reference No.: 03000252
- NYSRHP No.: 11949.000139

Significant dates
- Added to NRHP: April 18, 2003
- Designated NYSRHP: January 21, 2003

Rye Town Park-Bathing Complex and Oakland Beach is a historic park and public beach located on Long Island Sound at Rye City, Westchester County, New York. It is located next to the separately listed Playland Amusement Park. It was designed in 1909 by architects Upjohn & Conable (Hobart Upjohn and George W. Conable) and landscape architects Brinley & Holbrook. There are six historically significant buildings and structures; they are the Mission Revival style Bathing Complex. This includes the Bathing Pavilion and two shelters, a restaurant (1910), the Spring House, and the Women's Bath House (1925).

It was added to the National Register of Historic Places in 2003.

== See also ==
- National Register of Historic Places listings in southern Westchester County, New York
