= Trinity Lutheran Church (Friedheim, Missouri) =

Trinity Lutheran Church, Friedheim, Missouri
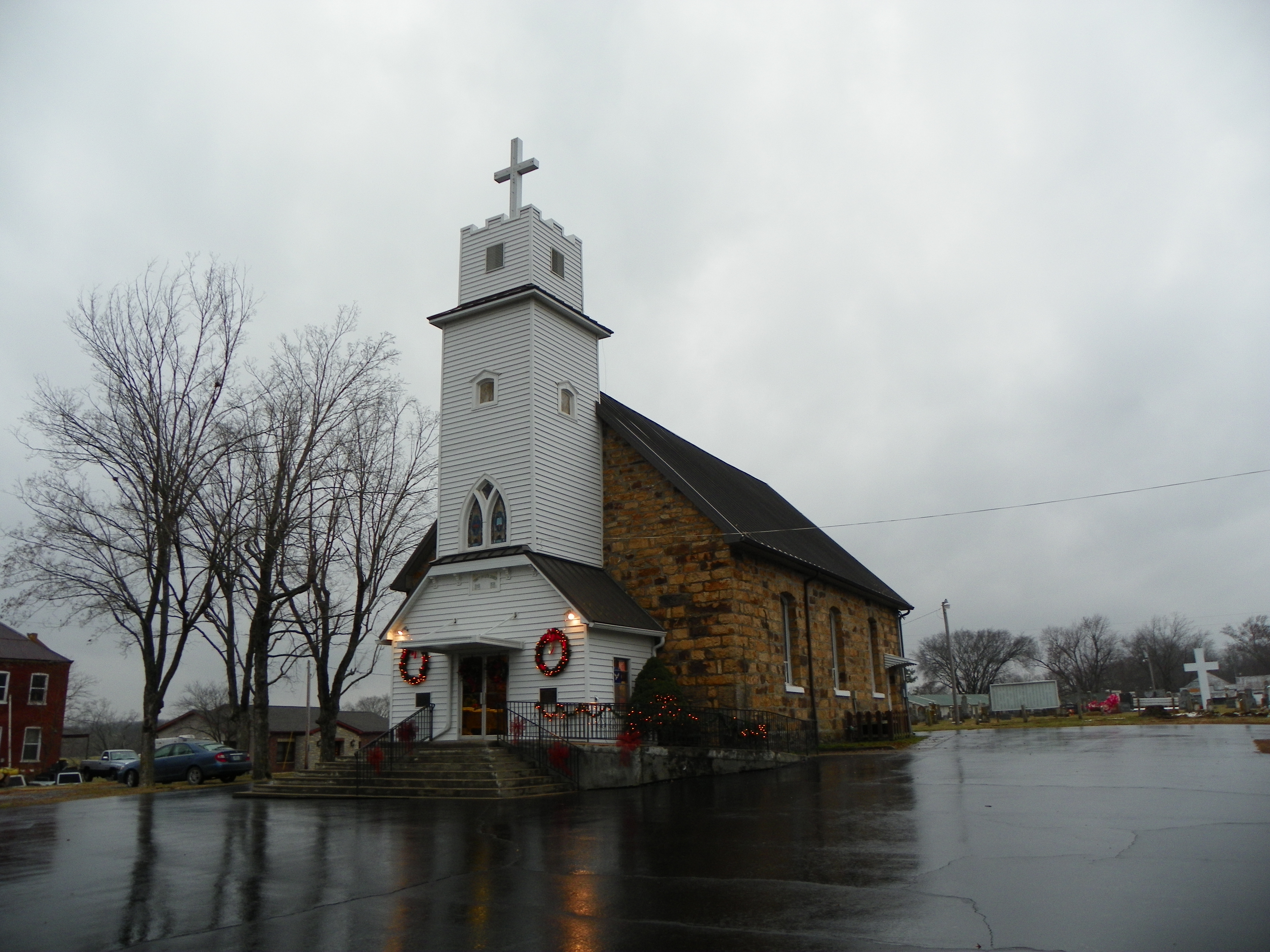

- Location within Missouri
- 37°34′11″N 89°49′07″W
- Location: 3700 Country Road 415, Friedheim, Missouri 63747
- Country: United States
- Denomination: Lutheran Church–Missouri Synod

History
- Founded: 1848
- Founder: Pastor Roger Steinbrueck

Administration
- District: Missouri District

Trinity Lutheran Church is a member congregation of the Lutheran Church–Missouri Synod (LCMS) in Friedheim, Missouri.

== History ==
The first German Lutheran immigrants to the area around Friedheim gathered in each other's homes for Sunday worship. Regular church services were eventually held in the home of Bernard Guessenberg who had the largest log house available. As early as 1843, the sacraments were provided once a month by Pastor Theodore Gruber of Paitzdorf when weather permitted. In 1847, the Lutheran families in Friedheim got their own parish pastor, Friedrich Julius Blitz, who was a graduate of Altenburg's Concordia Seminary. The first church, a log cabin was built in 1848 on the present church property. In 1849, a log cabin was built to serve as a Lutheran school. In 1856, a new permanent church building was constructed at a cost of $500, which was made from local sandstone rocks. The huge stones were hauled a quarter of a mile by oxen to the church site. The cornerstone for the present church was laid on May 6, 1857. The church was remodeled in 1948 for its 100th anniversary. There is an active Sunday school, Ladies Aid, softball and dart ball teams, vacation Bible school, youth group and men's club.

== Gallery ==
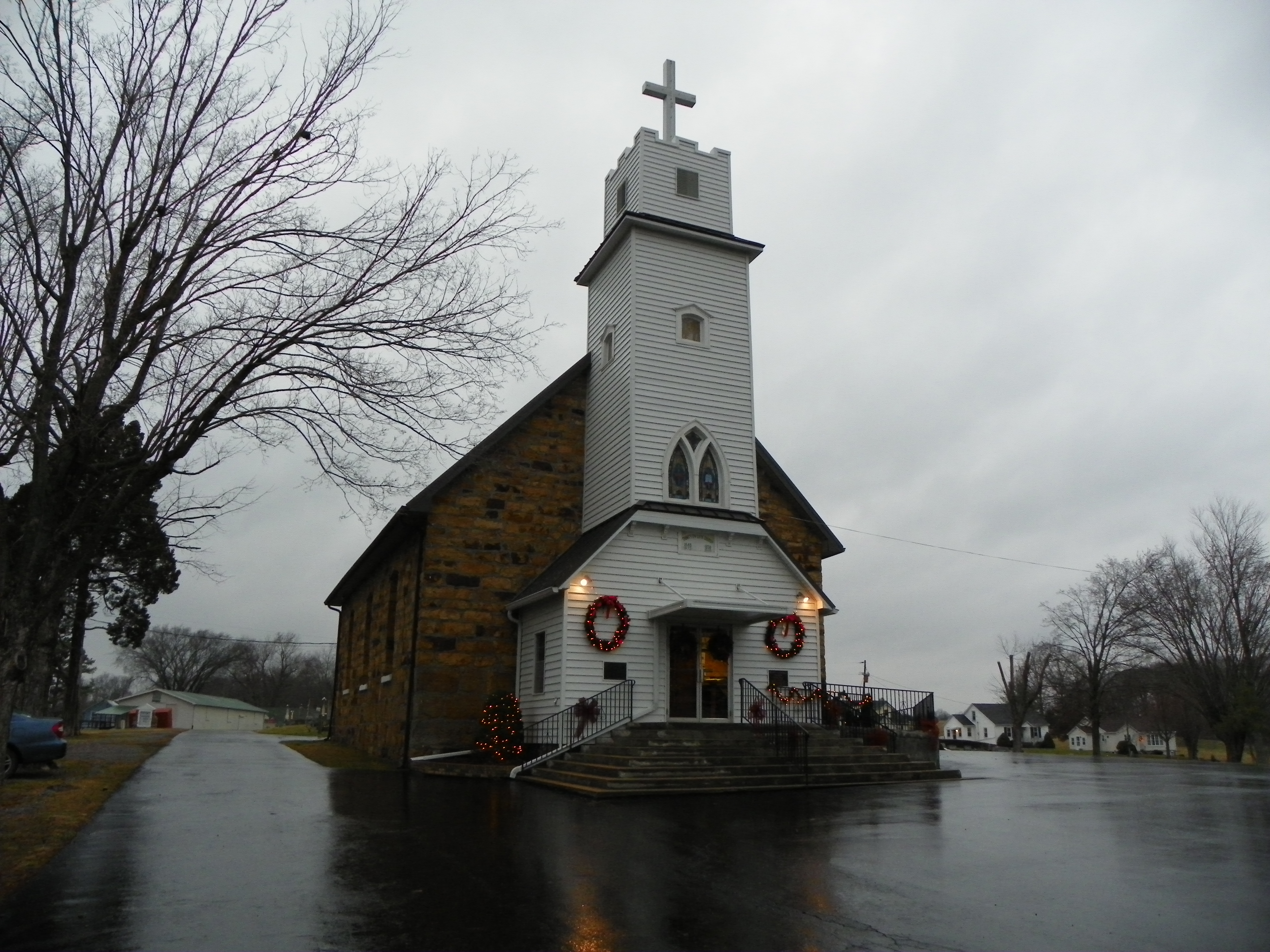
Trinity exterior

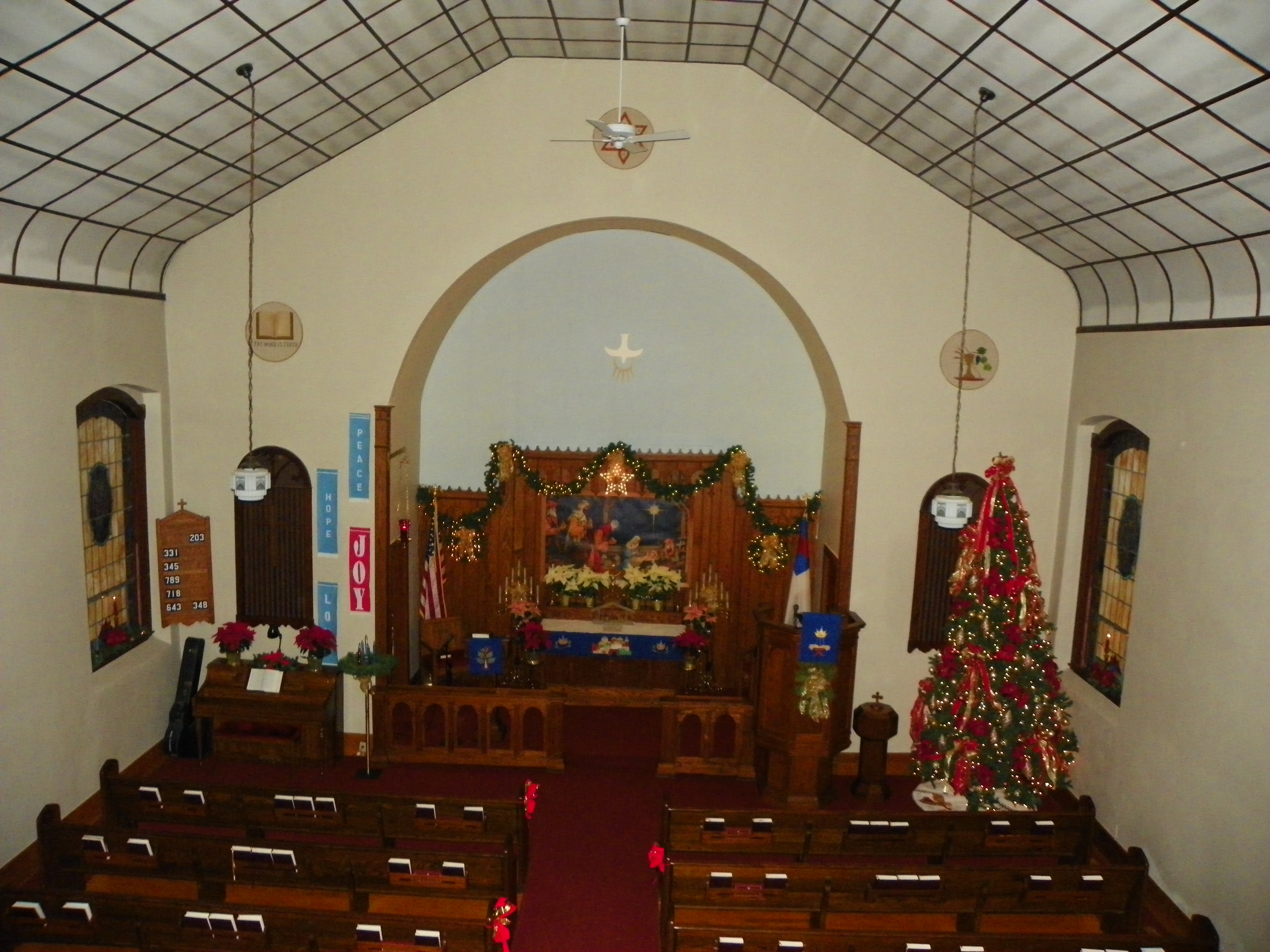
Trinity interior at Christmas

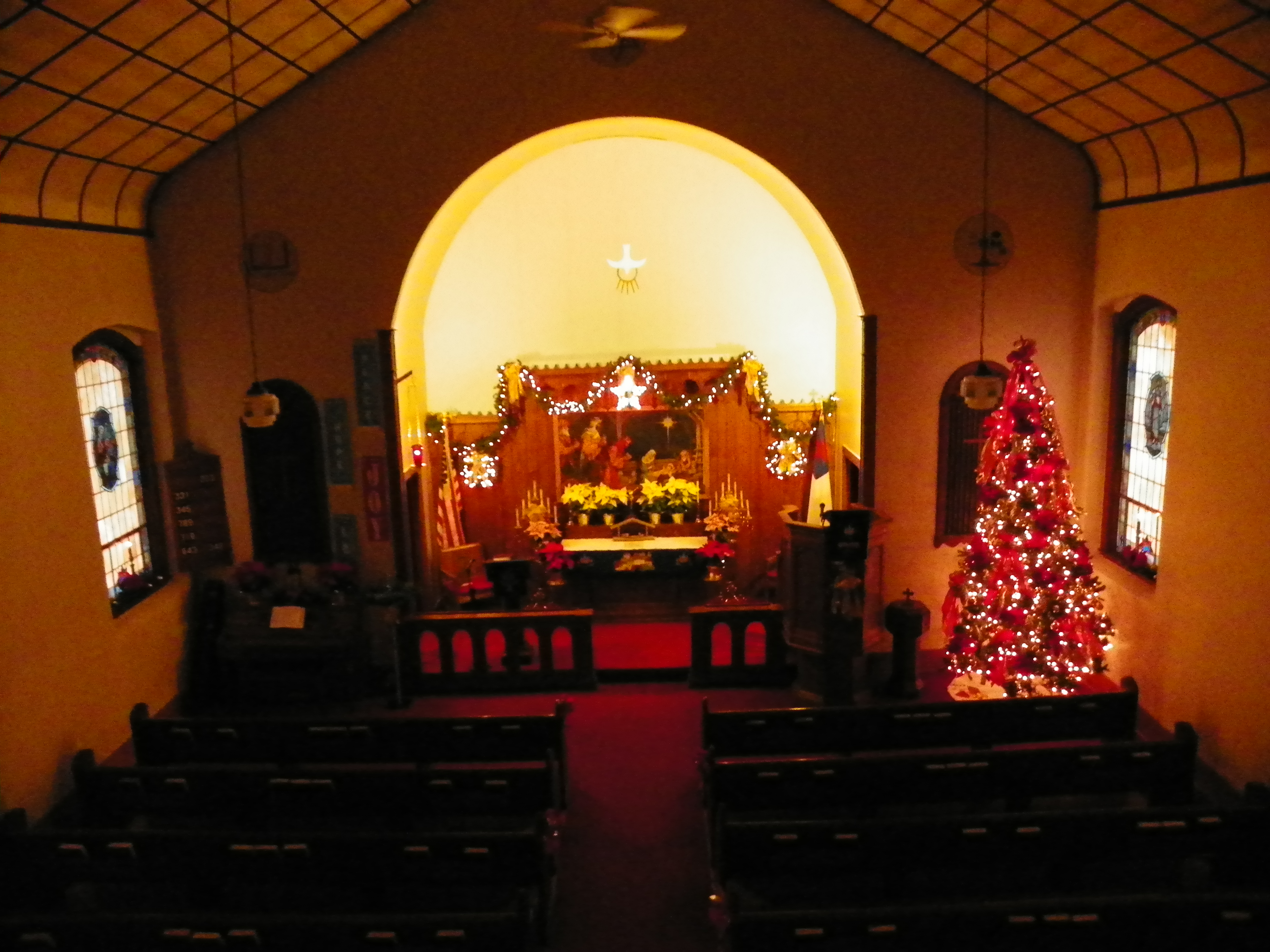
Trinity interior

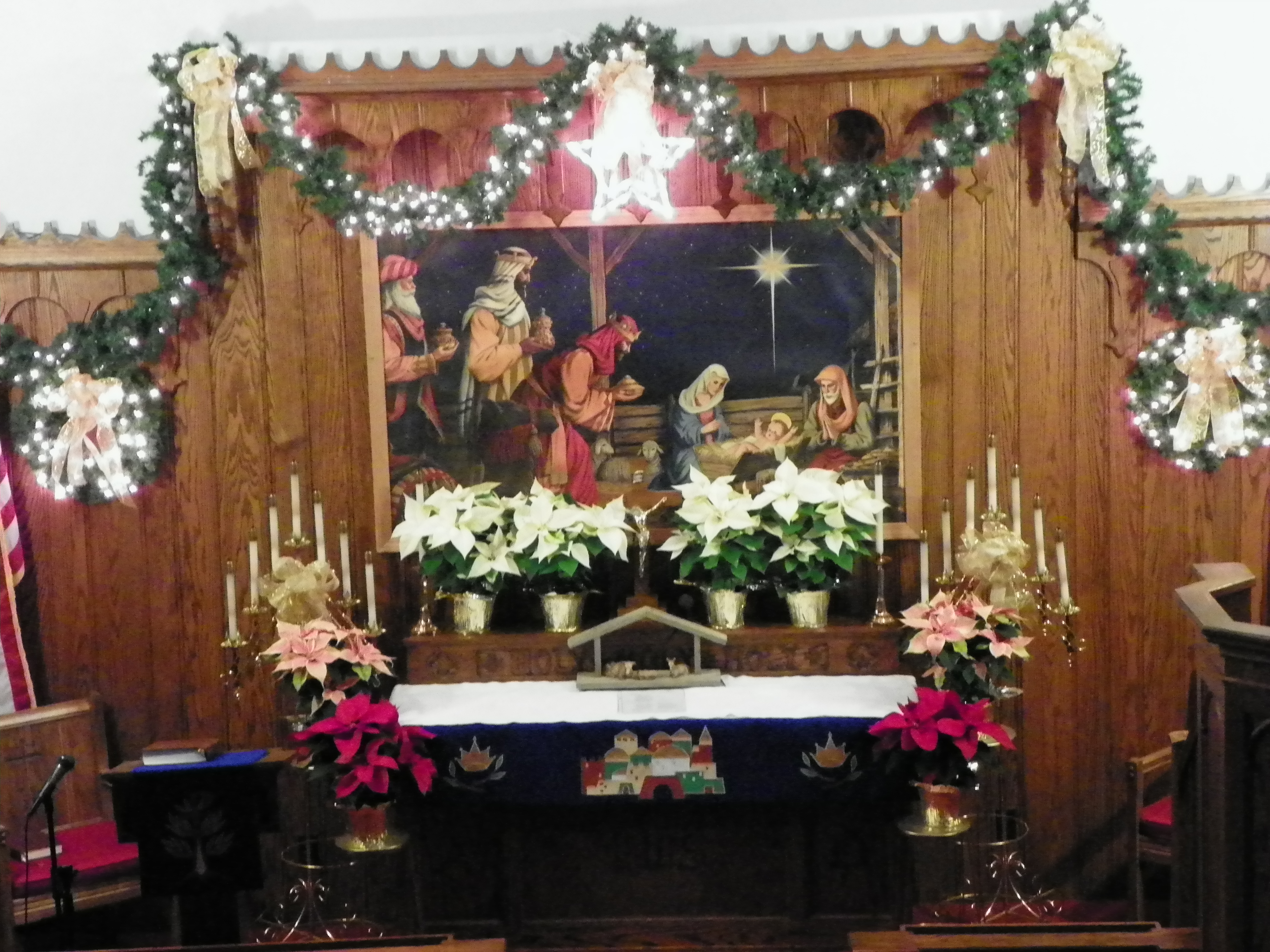
Trinity altar
