= Messiah Mission Church (New York City) =

Church in Manhattan, New York

Coordinates: 40.86554°N 73.92173°W

- Interactive map of the Messiah Mission Church area

General information
- Location: New York, New York, United States of America
- Construction started: 1926
- Completed: 1927
- Cost: $40,000
- Client: Messiah Evangelical Lutheran Church

Technical details
- Structural system: brick masonry

Design and construction
- Architect: George W. Conable 46 West 24th Street

Messiah Mission Church, also known as Messiah Evangelical Lutheran Church, was a Lutheran church in the Inwood neighborhood of Manhattan. The congregation was founded in 1916 and a two-storey brick school and chapel was built 1926 to designs by George W. Conable 46 West 24th Street, at 198-200 Sherman Avenue. The pastor who built the 1926 school church was Frederick P. Wilhem of 609 West 204th Street.

Messiah merged in 1945 with St. Matthew's Lutheran Church with that congregation moving into Messiah's building. Messiah's church was sold when St. Matthew's (with Messiah) moved into a newly built church at 202 Sherman Avenue, Inwood, in 1957.
