= Bethany Baptist Church (South Norfolk) =

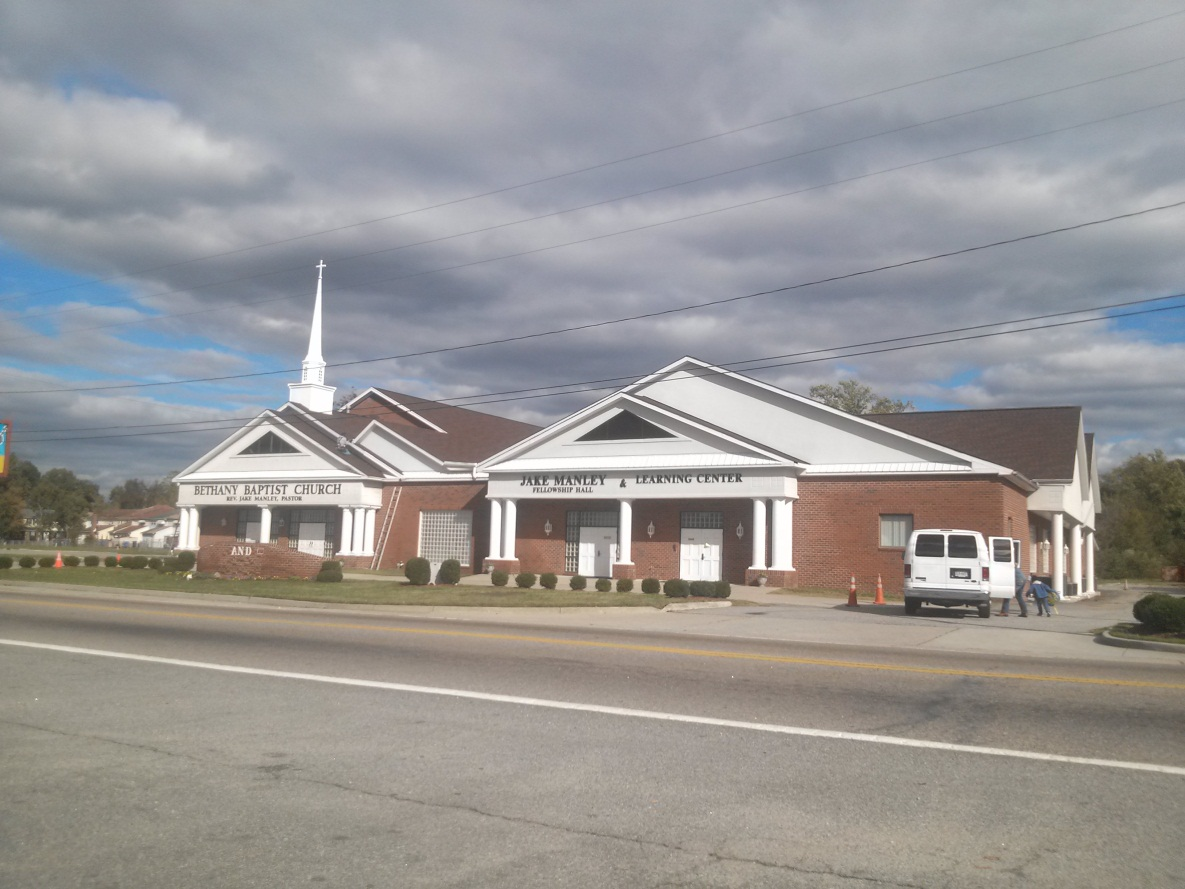
- Bethany Baptist Church building
- Bethany Baptist Church
- 36.808585310098486°N 76.25555560229438°W
- Location: Chesapeake, Virginia; South Norfolk neighborhood
- Country: United States
- Denomination: Baptist

History
- Founded: October 8, 1959; Berkley, Virginia

Architecture
- Completed: 1986 rebuilt 1996
- Demolished: 1982; Historical Berkley Church

Clergy
- Pastor: H. Patrick Cason

Bethany Baptist Church of South Norfolk, Virginia is a prominent Black church in Hampton Roads, Virginia, USA. Founded in the late 1950s to early 1960s, it has since had a major influence on the local black community and others. It has become one of the largest churches in the Hampton Roads area.

== History ==
The Bethany Baptist Church was founded on October 8, 1959, by a group of members of Chesapeake's First Baptist Church South Hill in the home of the late Mrs. Minnie Madrey at 410 Berkley Avenue with 100 chartered members in Berkley. The group wanted to advance the spiritual life in the Berkley community. In November 1959, the congregation began to seek a church edifice for parishioners to worship in. The former Chestnut Street Methodist Episcopal Church, South, now located in Virginia Beach, Virginia, was purchased at 523 Chestnut Street in the Berkley community. In the early 1980s, the interstate I-464 was being constructed, passing through the portion of Berkley where the church was located. As a result, in 1982 the Virginia Highway Department VDOT acquired the building. The church held services in the Teamsters Union Local #822 on 822 Bartee St. in Norfolk, Virginia, off Military Highway near Military Circle Mall. In 1985, the church began to erect a church at its present location at 2587 Campostella Rd. in Chesapeake, Virginia. The church's first service in this building commenced on Sunday, March 2, 1986. In 1996, the church built a new edifice to accommodate the increasing membership with an addition built in 2008.

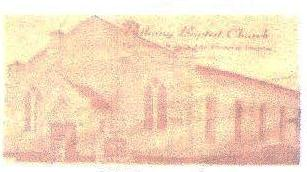
Former Bethany Baptist Church at 523 Chestnut St. in Berkley

== Pastors ==
Rev. E. C. Walton (1959–1962)
Rev. Roy Edler (1962–1967)
Rev. Dr. C.M. Heidelberg (1967–1968)
Rev. William A. Dyson Sr. (1968–1975)
Rev. Dr. Jake Manley, Sr. (1975–2013)
Rev. Dr. George H. Spicer (2013-2015) - interim pastor
Rev. Gregory Chapman (2015-2016) - interim pastor
Rev. H. Patrick Cason (2016–present)

== Attendance ==
In 1959, the church began with 100 members. In the 1990s, church membership began to increase. As of 2013 membership was estimated at 2,000–2,500 parishioners.

== Events ==
In 2013, the church hosted the Citywide Martin Luther King Jr. celebration, part of the City of Chesapeake's 50th anniversary observance.

== Community work ==
=== Showers of Blessings Ministry ===
In 1988, the late Rev. Jake Manley, Sr. founded the Showers of Blessings, a spiritual and life-skills ministry, with two women of the church. Over the years, it has served thousands, many of them drug addicts ordered by the courts into the program, whose lives were transformed by the ministry.

=== HIV-AIDS ministry ===
Bethany's HIV-AIDS ministry created one of the first AIDS/HIV support and counseling ministries among the Black churches in the Hampton Roads region under the leadership of Rev. Jake Manley.

=== Bethany House ===
As a noted provider of clothing, food and shelter, Bethany Baptist acquired property (called the Bethany House) to house those in need of temporary housing after release from the penal system.
