= Trinity Lutheran Church (Queens) =

- U.S. National Register of Historic Places
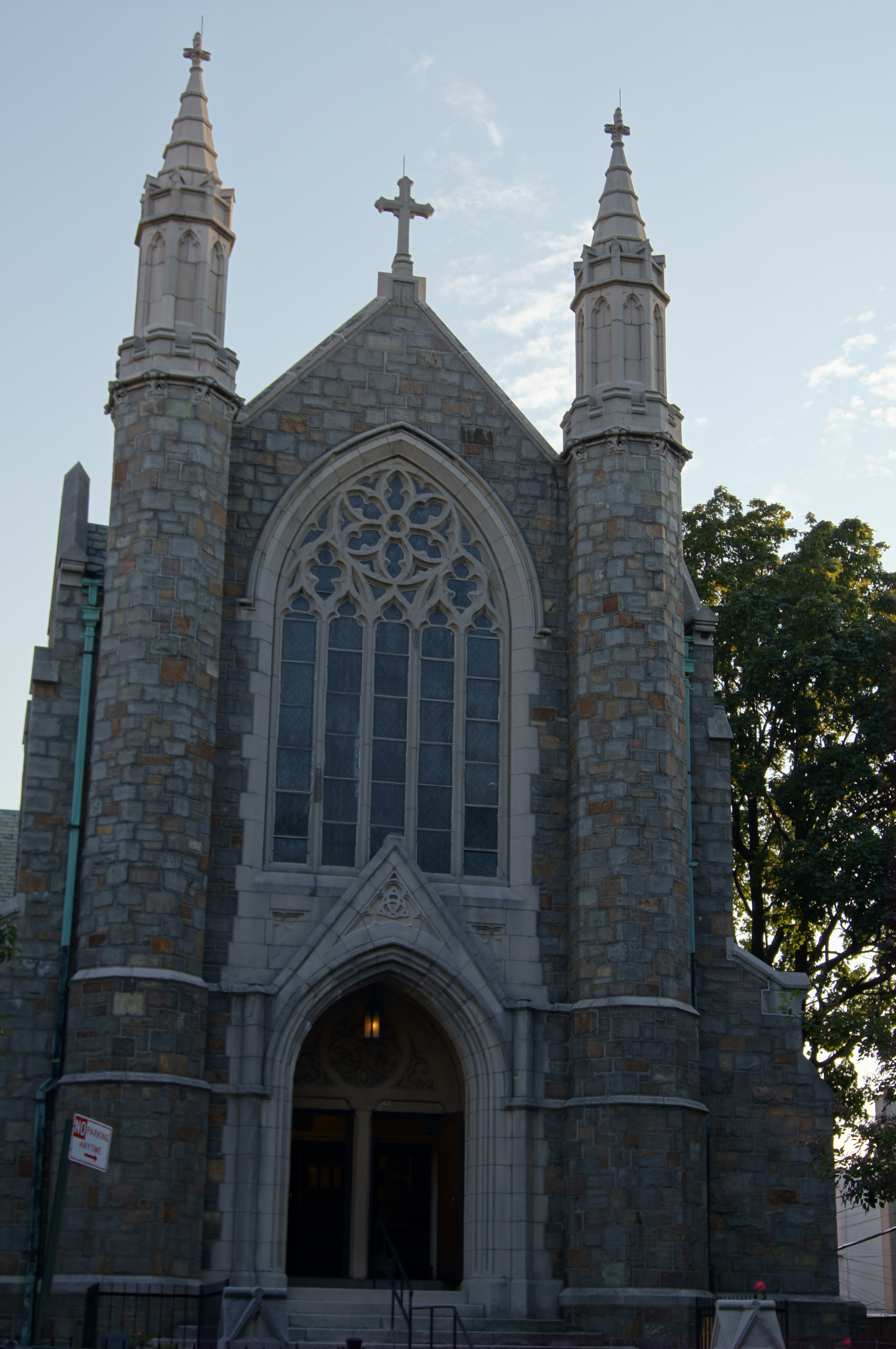

- Location within New York City Location within New York Location within the United States
- Location: 31-18 37th St., Astoria, New York
- Coordinates: 40°45′42.31″N 73°55′9.2″W
- Area: less than one acre
- Built: 1926
- Architect: Corbusier, John William Cresswell; Conable, George
- Architectural style: Gothic Revival, Collegiate Gothic
- NRHP reference No.: 08000471
- Added to NRHP: May 29, 2008

Trinity Lutheran Church is a historic Lutheran church at 31-18 37th Street in Astoria, Queens, New York. It was designed by John William Cresswell Corbusier and overseen by architect George W. Conable (1866–1933). The cornerstone was laid on October 17, 1926 and construction was finished on November 13, 1927. The contractor was the Rufus H. Brown company, who have done considerable church work around NYC.

It is a one-story Collegiate Gothic style building constructed of Wymouth granite stones. The front elevation features a recessed entry with a large window above, framed by two spires with ornate turrets. The interior is in a Gothic plan of nave and transepts.

The steeple of this church was hit by lightning on August 2006.

It was listed on the National Register of Historic Places in 2008 and is also a state landmark.

== Music ==
The church owns a 1927 Skinner pipe organ, which is still operational and used during Sunday services. The church also has a handbell choir which rings hymns, peals and processionals. Other musical activity at the church includes a choir, piano, flute and musical saw. The NYC Musical Saw Festival was held at this church from 2008 to 2015, with the Guinness World Record for the largest musical saw ensemble established at this church at the 7th NYC Musical Saw Festival, July 18th, 2009, with 53 sawists playing together on the altar. At later festivals the altar accommodated 60 sawists.

== See also ==
- National Register of Historic Places listings in Queens, New York
