= Trinity Evangelical Lutheran Church of Manhattan =

Church in Manhattan, New York

- Trinity Lutheran Church
- U.S. National Register of Historic Places
- New York State Register of Historic Places
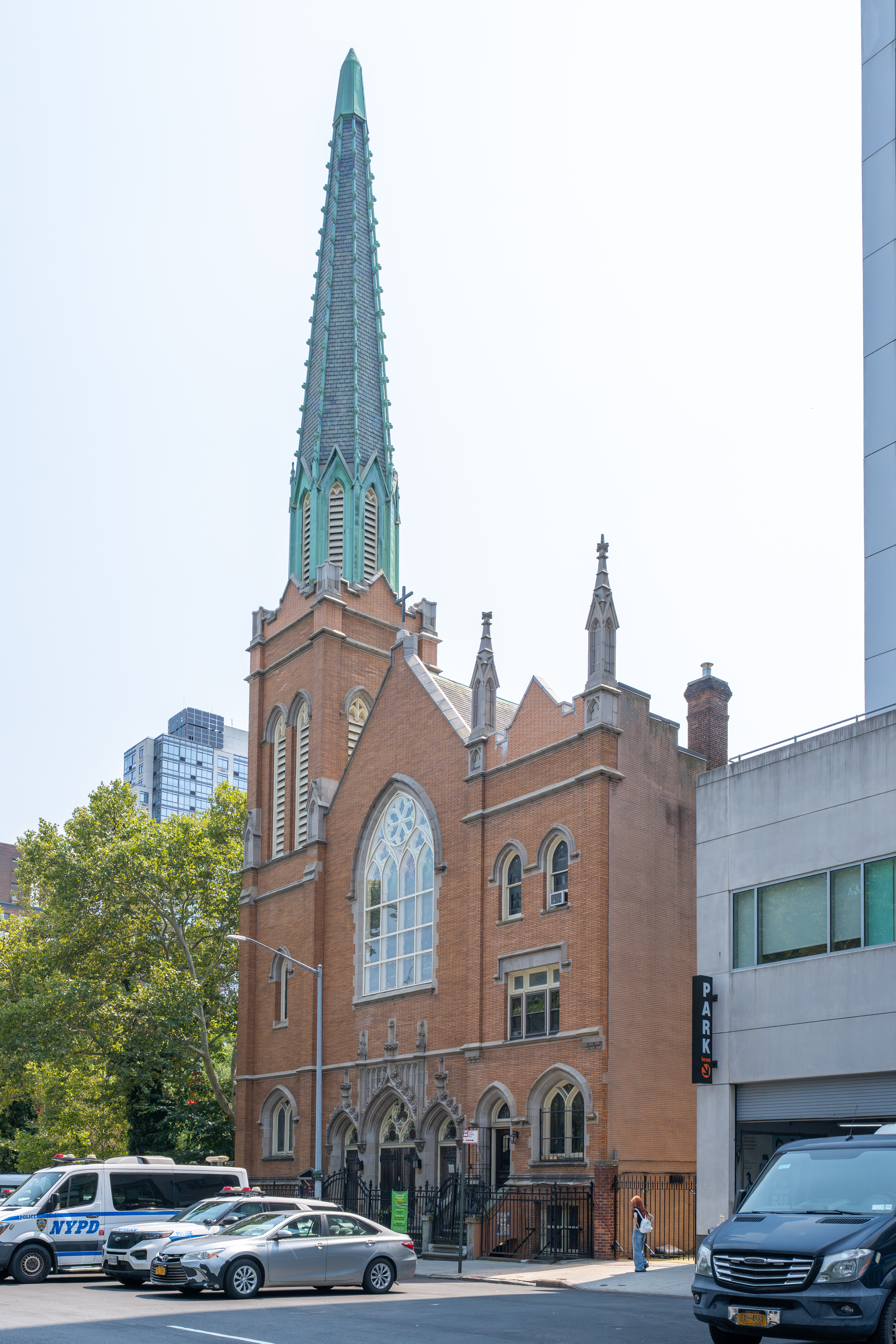
- (2026)

- Location within New York City
- Location: 164 W. 100th St. Manhattan, New York City
- Coordinates: 40°47′46.25″N 73°58′5.26″W
- Area: Upper West Side
- Built: 1908
- Architect: George W. Conable
- Architectural style: Gothic Revival
- Website: http://en.tlcofnyc.org/
- NRHP reference No.: 09000722
- NYSRHP No.: 06101.016141

Significant dates
- Added to NRHP: September 16, 2009
- Designated NYSRHP: August 5, 2009

Trinity Evangelical Lutheran Church of Manhattan is a Lutheran church located at 164 West 100th Street just east of Amsterdam Avenue, on the Upper West Side of Manhattan in New York City. It was founded in 1888 as the German Evangelical Lutheran Church to serve German immigrants moving into the Upper West Side. It initially held services in a storefront until money had been raised to buy land and build a sanctuary.

The double-height brick and stone masonry church building was constructed in 1908, and was designed by George W. Conable in the Gothic Revival style. In the 1950s, the building was slated for demolition as part of Robert Moses' urban renewal program, but the parish resisted and eventually, after 10 years, won the battle. It became the only structure within 32 acres (13 ha) in its neighborhood not to have been razed by Moses. On September 26, 2009, the building was listed on the National Register of Historic Places.

The church is a member congregation of the Evangelical Lutheran Church in America and is a Reconciling in Christ partner.

== See also ==
- National Register of Historic Places listings in Manhattan from 59th to 110th Streets
