= Nat Shapiro =

Nat Shapiro (September 27, 1922, New York City - December 15, 1983, New York City) was an American jazz writer and record producer.

Shapiro worked in the music industry from the late 1940s; he was a promotional director for Mercury Records in 1948-50, served as head of public relations for BMI in 1955-56, and was the A&R leader for Columbia Records from 1956–66, during which time he produced dozens of records. His credits as a producer include work with Nina Simone, Phil Woods, and Michel Legrand. With Nat Hentoff, Shapiro co-edited two books on jazz, Hear Me talkin' to Ya (1955) and The Jazz Makers (1957), now recognized as classic historical efforts. He also compiled and edited Encyclopedia of Quotations about Music for Doubleday in 1978. A collection of cynical quotations, Whatever It Is, I'm Against It (1984), was published shortly after his death.

Shapiro introduced Galt MacDermot to Gerome Ragni and Jim Rado, the writers of the musical Hair, and MacDermot composed the score.
