= Christ Church Lutheran (New York City) =

Church in Manhattan, New York

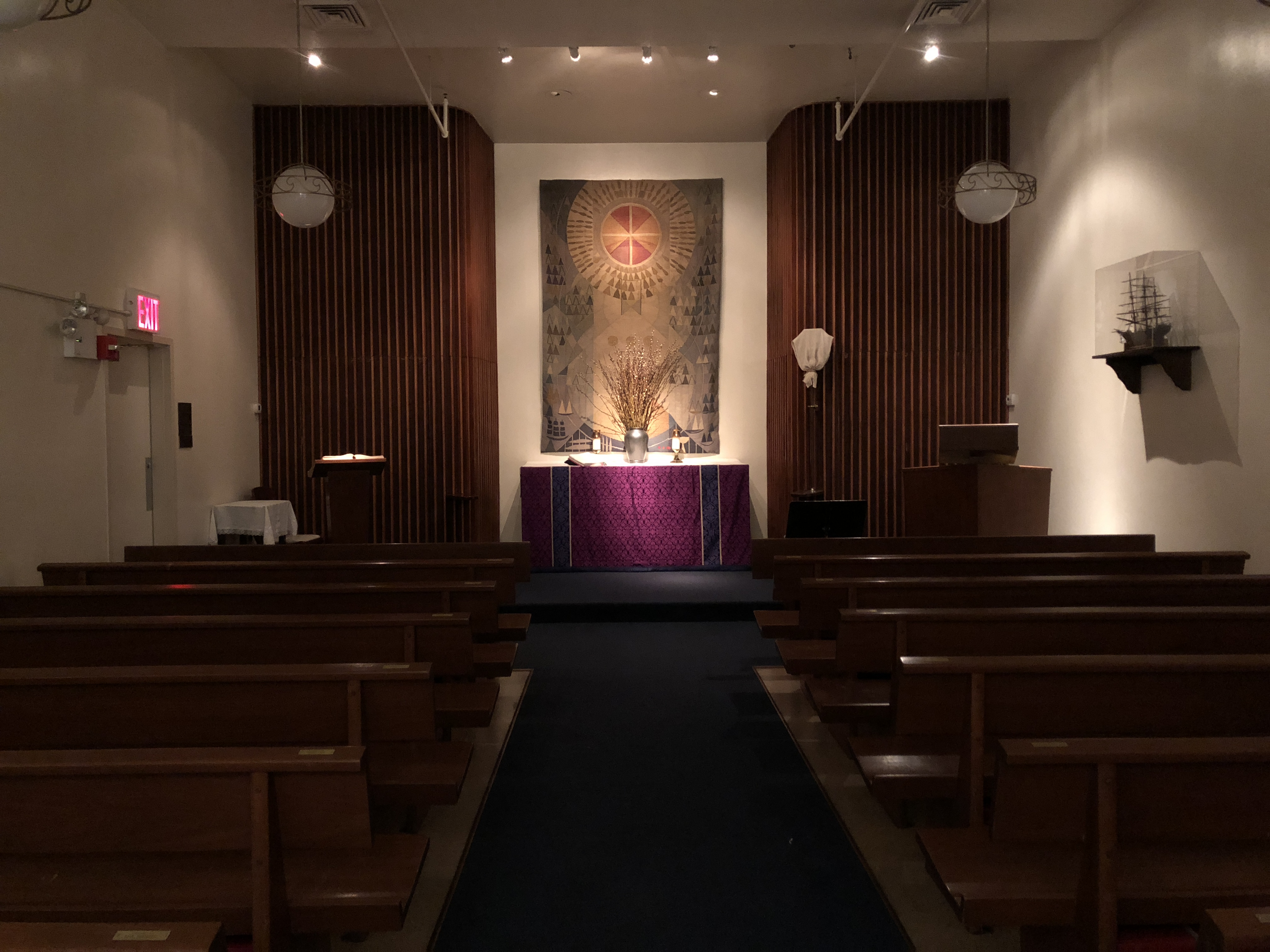
- The interior of the Chapel where services are held.
- Christ Church Lutheran
- 40°44′4.73″N 73°59′16.8″W
- Location: New York City
- Country: United States
- Denomination: Evangelical Lutheran Church in America
- Website: Church website

History
- Founded: 1868

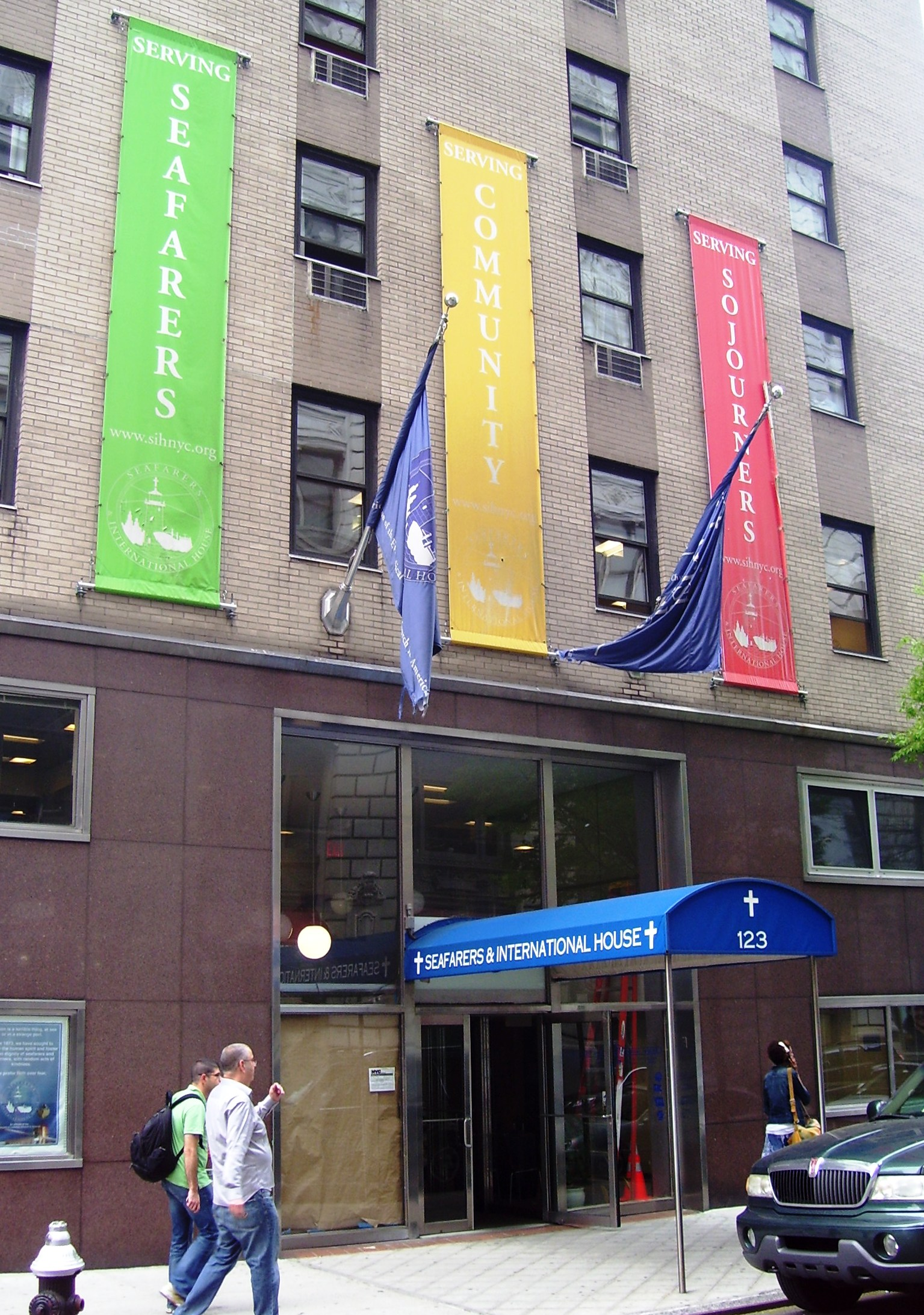
Since 2007 the congregation has been meeting in the Seafarer and International House at 23 East 15th Street at Irving Place

Christ Church Lutheran is an Evangelical Lutheran Church in America church located near Union Square in Manhattan, New York City at 123 East 15th Street at Irving Place, in the Seafarer and International House. The congregation was founded as the Evangelical Lutheran Church of Christ in 1868 and has had four premises in its history.

== History ==
The Evangelical Lutheran Church of Christ congregation was founded in 1868 above a blacksmith shop on East14th Street. The congregation was of German and English descent. A more permanent presence was established in 1882 when the church purchased the former mission chapel, the Chapel of Free Grace, located at 406 East 19th Street, which had been built in 1859 by St. George's Episcopal Church. It was a gable-fronted steeply pitched masonry Gothic Revival church with a gable rose window.

The 19th Street church was demolished when Metropolitan Life Insurance redeveloped the area into Stuyvesant Town in 1948. The congregation's new church, a block to the west on 15th Street, was built in 1948 and was designed by Herbert E. Matz in the Gothic Revival style. This structure was sold in 2007 to a developer who adaptively reused the church as a residence and added a luxury condo tower with six three-bedroom units above the church. Thereafter the congregation has been meeting in "the facilities of the Seafarer and International House at 123 East 15th Street at Irving Place."

== Bibliography ==
- Dunlap, David W. (2004). From Abyssinian to Zion: A Guide to Manhattan's Houses of Worship. New York: Columbia University Press. ISBN 0-231-12543-7.
