= Bethany Baptist Church (New York City) =

Church in Manhattan, New York

Coordinates: 40°49′41.92″N 73°56′19.19″W

- Interactive map of the Bethany Baptist Church area

General information
- Architectural style: Gothic Revival architecture
- Location: New York, New York, United States of America
- Completed: 1921
- Cost: $250.00 for the wall in 1911; $75,000.00 for the church in 1921
- Client: Washington Heights Evangelical Lutheran Church of 546 West 153rd Street

Design and construction
- Architects: Upjohn & Conable (for the wall in 1911); Francik Averkamp (for the church in 1921)

Bethany Baptist Church is a Baptist church located at 303 West 153rd Street in Manhattan, New York City. The church building was originally built for as the Washington Heights Evangelical Lutheran Church, built 1921 to designs by architect Francik Averkamp of 600 West 181st Street. A minor brick and stone fence was built in 1911 to designs by Upjohn & Conable, indicating an earlier building.

Bethany Baptist was founded by the Rev. John Joseph on February 12, 1932 at 327 West 126th Street, New York City. There is no current pastor at this time.

== Bibliography ==
- Dunlap, David W. From Abyssinian to Zion: A Guide to Manhattan's Houses of Worship. (New York: Columbia University Press, 2004.).
