= Saxon Lutheran Memorial (Frohna, Missouri) =

Historic house in Missouri, United States

- Christian A. Bergt Farm
- U.S. National Register of Historic Places
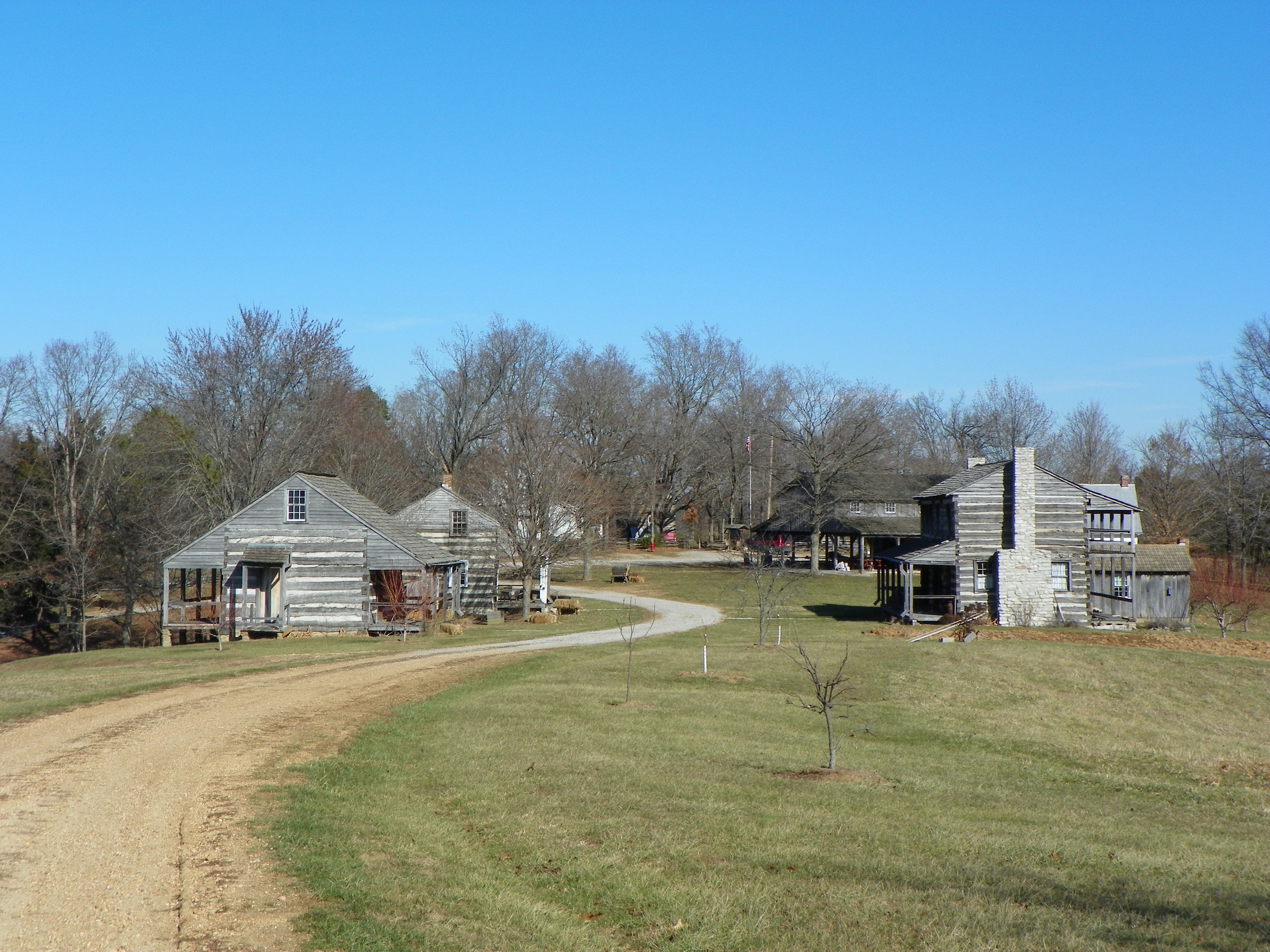

- Location within Missouri Location within the United States
- Location: 296 Saxon Memorial Dr, Frohna, Missouri, 63748-9108, USA
- Coordinates: 37°38′43″N 89°36′53″W
- Area: 11.2 acres (4.5 ha)
- Built: 1840
- Website: http://saxonlutheranmemorial.org/
- NRHP reference No.: 80002387
- Added to NRHP: January 10, 1980

The Saxon Lutheran Memorial in Frohna, Missouri, commemorates the German Lutheran migration of 1838–1839, and features a number of log cabins and artifacts from that era. The memorial opened in 1962 and was placed on the National Register of Historic Places in 1980.

== Memorial ==
The Saxon Lutheran Memorial is listed on the National Register of Historic Places. In 2009, it was recognized by the Friends of Missouri State Archive Association as the last complete home and farmstead complex of its era. The entire facility depicts aspects of the Saxon migration and settlement, and displays the domestic and farming artifacts of 19th century German rural settlements in Perry County, Missouri.

The Saxon Lutheran Memorial is an outdoor history museum in the setting of a log cabin village located on the homestead and farm of the Bergt Farm Complex. The complex has been open as a historic site since 1964 and has been listed in the National Register of Historic Places since 1980. The complex consists of 30 acres (12 ha) dominated by the log-cabin frame house and hewn log section building that was the home of brothers Wilhelm and Christian Adolf Bergt. Now restored, the Bergt Home contains household utensils and furniture from the pioneer period. This historic building has been through many changes through the years. A lean-to porch was added across the west side when the second log cabin was built. In the 1840s, a board and batten lean-to was built across the east side to serve as kitchen, bedroom, and porch, and was then removed in the 1920s. In 1870, a room was added beyond the west porch. Later the porch was closed in to serve as a kitchen. In 1913, the larger frame addition completed the house. The house serves as the curator's residence.

The site also contains a granary, a timber frame barn which contains within it an earlier double crib hewn log barn, and two log outbuildings whose original use is uncertain. These buildings were constructed in the period from the second quarter of the 19th century to the first quarter of the 20th century. The site also hosts a visitors' center and an outdoor museum for farm equipment. The memorial was dedicated October 31, 1964, on the 125th anniversary of the Saxon Immigration.

A machine shed was added to the site in 1990 and is filled with old machinery. Several buildings with connections to the descendants of the Saxons living in the area have been moved to the site in recent years, including the Fenwick Cabin, the Hamilton-Goehring Cabin, the Schuppan Haus, and the newest addition, the 1904 Confirmation Room from Concordia Lutheran Church in Frohna. Other buildings have been constructed on the site to depict the customs and way of life of the 19th century settlers: a bake oven, a blacksmith shop, and a woodworking shop.

== History ==
In the 19th-century German Kingdom of Saxony, Lutheran pastor Martin Stephan and many of his followers found themselves increasingly at odds with the established Lutheran Church. In order to freely practice their Christian faith in accordance with the Lutheran confessions outlined in the Book of Concord, approximately 700 Saxon Lutherans left for the United States in November 1838. Their ships arrived January 5, 1839 in New Orleans. After spending some time waiting for that last ship (which was lost at sea), most of the remaining 600 immigrants settled in Perry County, Missouri, and in and around St. Louis. Among the group were Christian Adolph Bergt and Caroline Louise Voelker, who married in 1841. In 1847 the Bergts acquired the property of an early pioneer named Thomas Twyman who had settled in the area in 1820. The property remained in the Bergt family until 1957. The property was purchased by the Concordia Historical Institute of St. Louis in 1961. The property was restored and in 1964 was dedicated and opened to the public as a "walk-in History Book" of German immigrant life in America.

== Festival ==
Saxon Lutheran Memorial's annual Fall Festival is held on the second Saturday in October each year and features demonstrations of activities common in the mid-1800s, such as blacksmithing, quilting, cross-cut sawing, cider-pressing, bread-baking, butchering, apple-butter-cooking, spinning, and the making of brooms, shingles, and soap.

The festival also offers horse-and-buggy rides, a silent-auction, skits, live music, food, and handmade crafts.

== Gallery ==
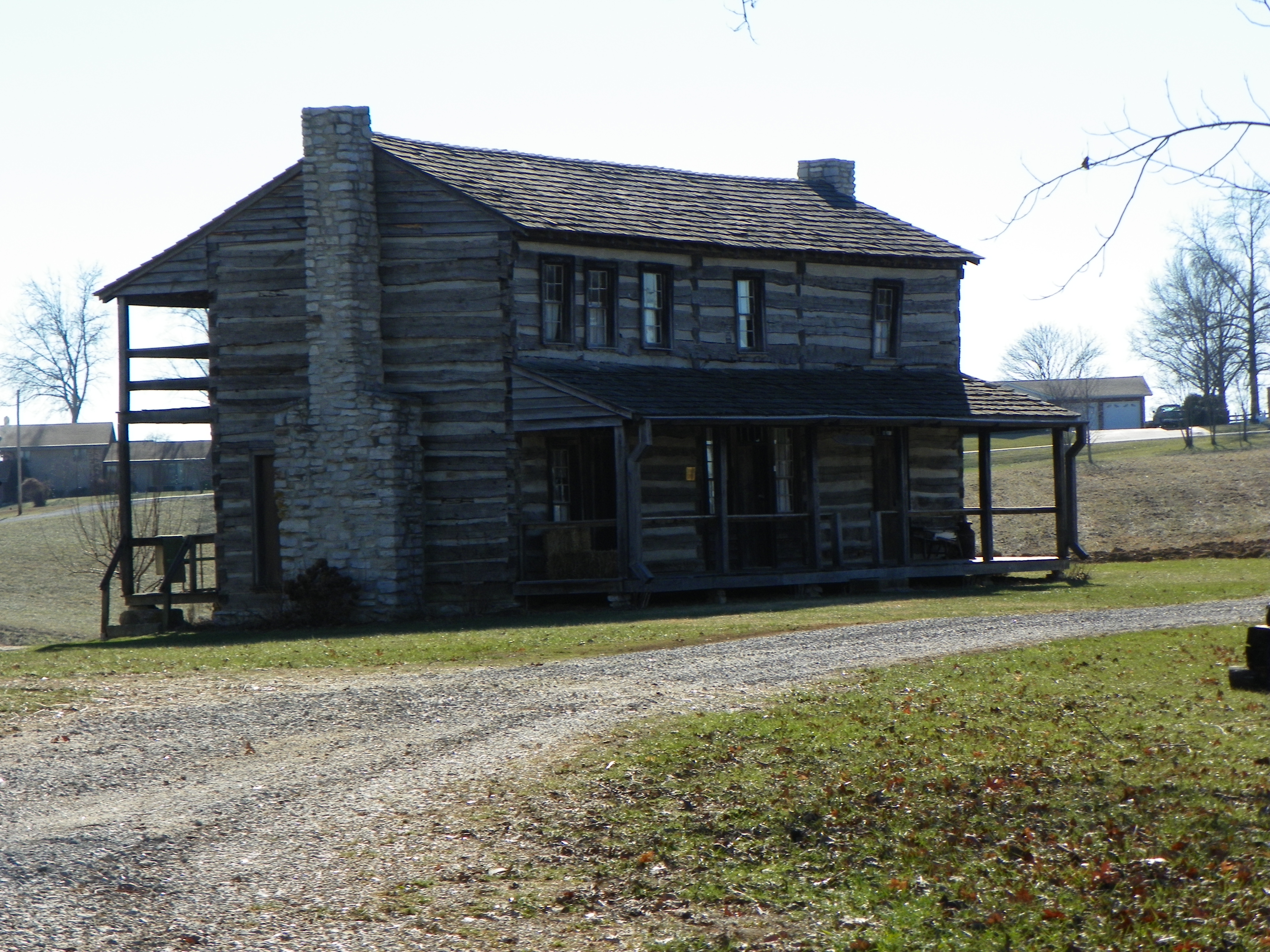
Saxon Lutheran Memorial

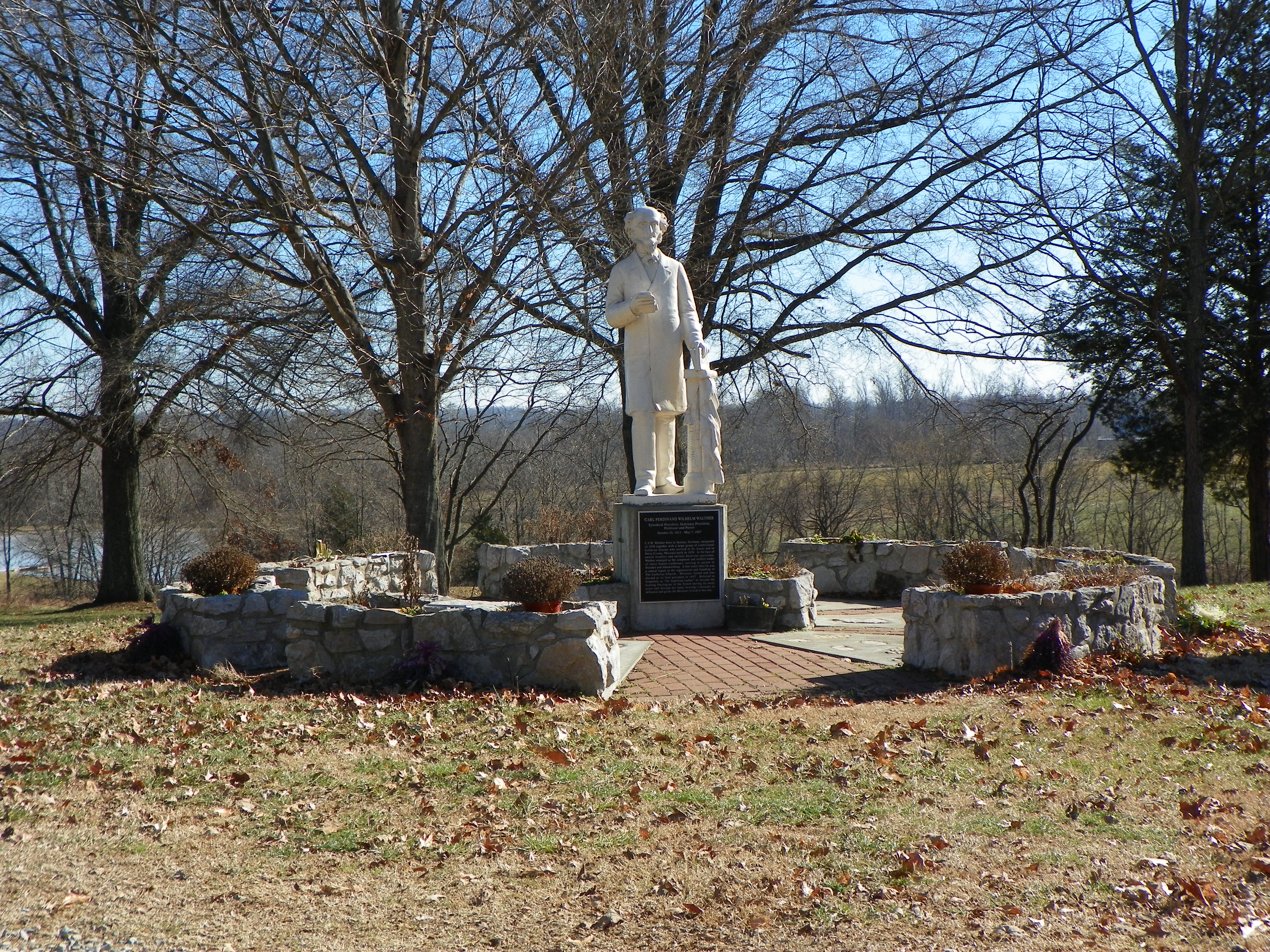
Carl Ferdinand Wilhelm Walther statue

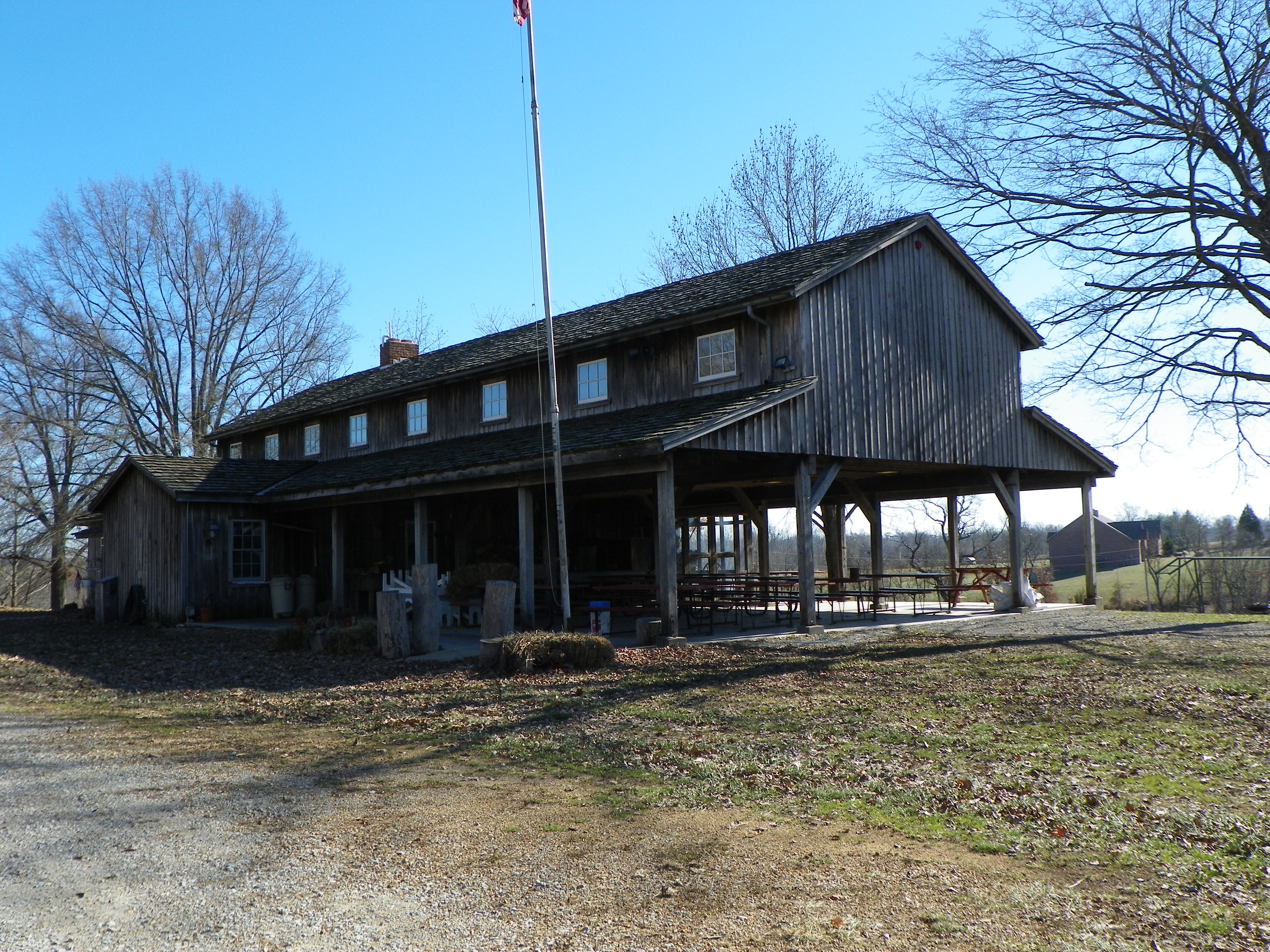
Saxon Memorial

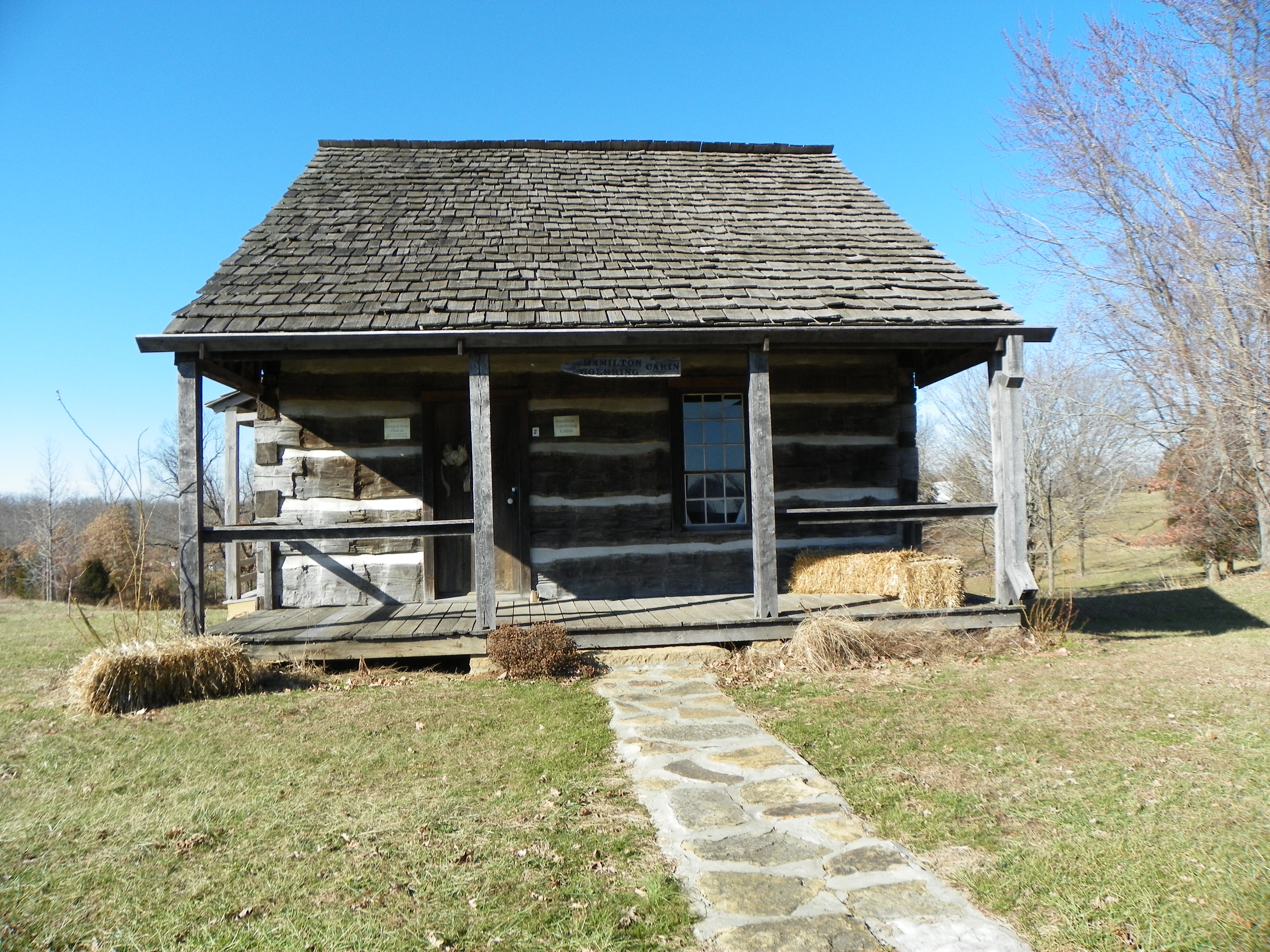
Saxon Lutheran Memorial cabin

== See also ==
- Concordia Log Cabin College (Altenburg, Missouri)
