= Immanuel Lutheran Church (Altenburg, Missouri) =

Immanuel Lutheran Church, Altenburg, Missouri
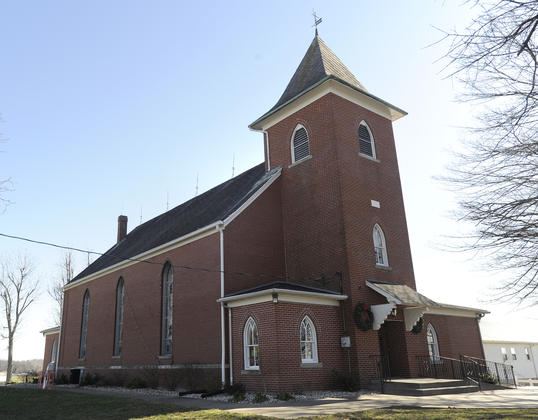

- Location within Missouri Location within the United States
- 37°37′41″N 89°35′42″W
- Location: 8201 Main Street, PO Box 26; Altenburg, Missouri 63732
- Country: United States
- Denomination: Lutheran Church–Missouri Synod

History
- Founded: November 2, 1857
- Founder: Pastor Schieferdecker

Administration
- District: Missouri District

Clergy
- Pastor: Frank E. Lucas

Immanuel Lutheran Church in Altenburg, Missouri, is a congregation of the Lutheran Church–Missouri Synod (LCMS).

== History ==
=== Schism ===
Immanuel Lutheran Church was founded by members of Trinity Lutheran Church in Altenburg as the result of a dispute concerning chiliasm (German chiliastenstreit) that had begun in 1856.

Georg Albert Schieferdecker (1815-1891) became pastor of Trinity Lutheran Church in 1850 following the death of Pastor Loeber. The beginning of the dispute arose in the spring of 1856 when the Western District of the LCMS held its sessions in Altenburg. After two days of discussion concerning questions over the future and universal conversion of Israel and the so-called thousand-year reign—a dispute surrounding the interpretation of Revelation 20—the district passed resolutions rejecting and condemning all forms of chiliasm. Two members of the district along with a deputy declared they were not in agreement with these resolutions. One of these members was Pastor Gruber, who was the oldest minister of the synod at that time; the other was Schieferdecker, who was also the district president.

The incident affected the congregation in Altenburg, which then numbered almost 100 members. Shortly after the resolution had been passed, parties rose up for and against the verdict. Pastor Röbbelen was against chiliasm and his declarations found approval with many members of the Altenburg congregation. Over the next year the debate led to division within the congregation. At the convention of the LCMS in 1857 in Fort Wayne, Indiana, charges of heresy were levied against Schieferdecker. The charges led to even deeper division and the subsequent resignation of Schieferdecker. The synod declared that any member of the congregation who did not agree with the resolutions of the Synod was forthwith expelled from the Synod and the congregation, and were deemed followers of a heretic. Approximately one-third of the members ignored the synodical decision and followed their former pastor out of the church.

=== New congregation ===
The next day, on November 2, 1857, a new church was incorporated under the name "Immanuel Congregation". The congregation joined the Evangelical Lutheran Synod of Iowa, which later merged into the American Lutheran Church.

At first, church services were held in people's houses, but construction of a blockhouse to serve as a temporary church was begun. It was dedicated seven weeks later at the first service celebrating Christmas. Work was begun in early 1858 on a larger stone church, which was dedicated on the Second Sunday of Advent, 1858.

The schism that led to the division and creation of a new congregation in Altenburg was also felt in New Wells, Missouri. There, the congregation also separated into two opposing groups.

Immanuel rejoined the LCMS in 1988. Worship services are no longer conducted in German, but at Christmas Eve services the congregation still sings "Silent Night" in German before singing it in English.

== Gallery ==
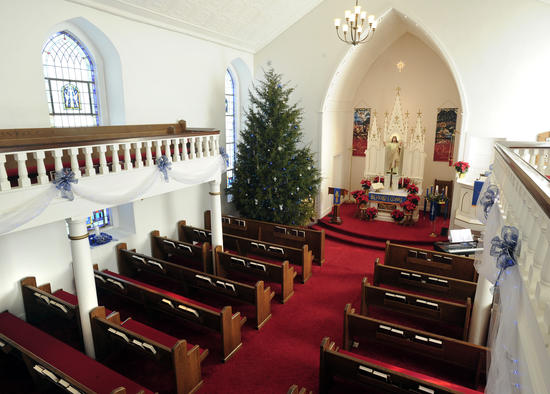
Church interior

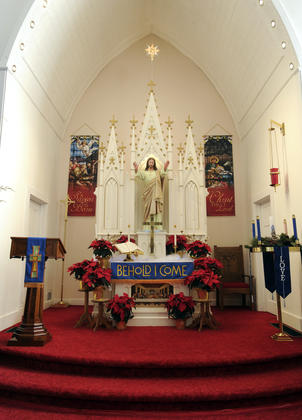
Altar
