= Concordia Lutheran Church (Frohna, Missouri) =

Church in Missouri, United States

Concordia Lutheran Church, Frohna, Missouri
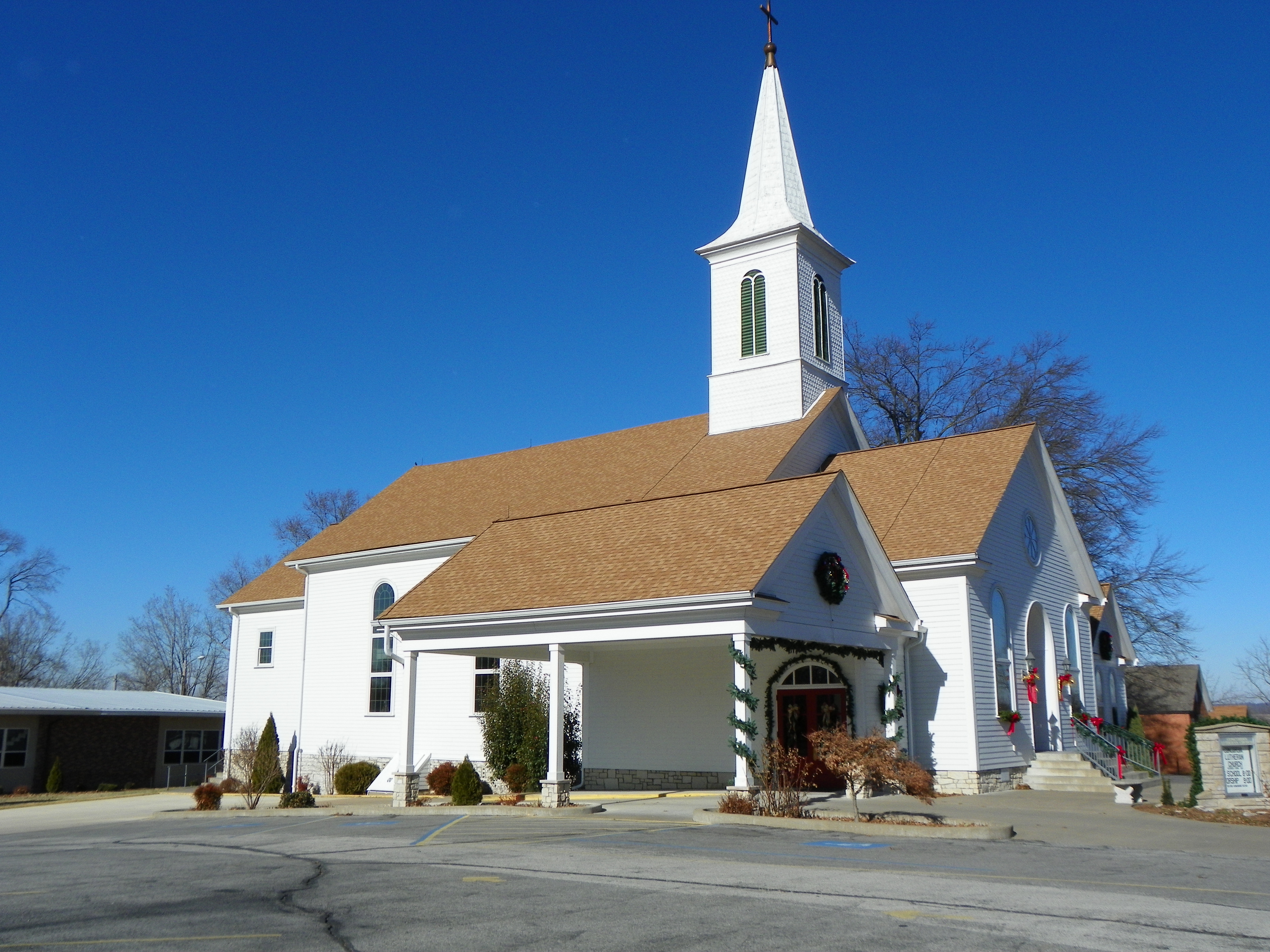

- Location within Missouri Location within the United States
- 37°38′26″N 89°37′09″W
- Location: 10172 Hwy C, Frohna, Missouri 63748
- Country: United States
- Denomination: Lutheran Church–Missouri Synod

History
- Founded: 1839
- Founder: Pastor Ernst Gerhard Wilhelm Keyl

Administration
- District: Missouri District

Concordia Lutheran Church is an LCMS (Lutheran Church–Missouri Synod) church in Frohna, Missouri.

== Name ==
The name Concordia is in reference to the confession of faith of the Evangelical Lutheran Church adopted in 1850, which is commonly known as the "Book of Concord," or in short as the "Concordia."

== History ==
The community of Frohna was founded by 29 families from Altenburg, Missouri, in 1839. Concordia Lutheran Church was established by Pastor Ernst Gerhard Wilhelm Keyl in his home that same year. A log cabin church, 17 by 27 feet (5.2 m × 8.2 m), was constructed in 1843–44. Rev. Christoph Henirich Loeber served as pastor from 1850 to 1862, and under his guidance a rock church, 44 by 30 feet (13.4 m × 9.1 m) and 16 feet (4.9 m) tall, was built in 185. During the Civil War, the church in Frohna merged with Trinity Church in Altenburg. In 1874, J. F. Koestering built a larger white frame church, 60 by 36 feet (18 m × 11 m) and 22 feet (6.7 m) tall. This church building originally had two aisles, but the church was remodeled in 1949 to contain only a single central aisle. The original pews, altar, and pulpit were kept. The church parishes officially separated again in 1877, and have been separate since then.

== Gallery ==
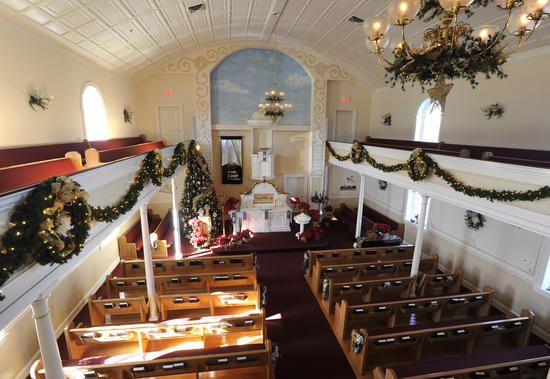
Church interior at Christmas

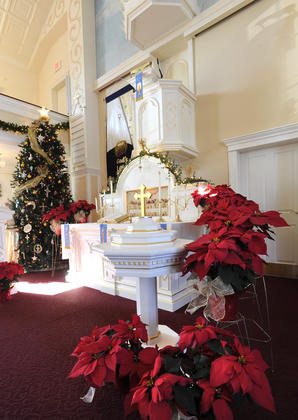
Altar
