= Frohna, Missouri =

- Village
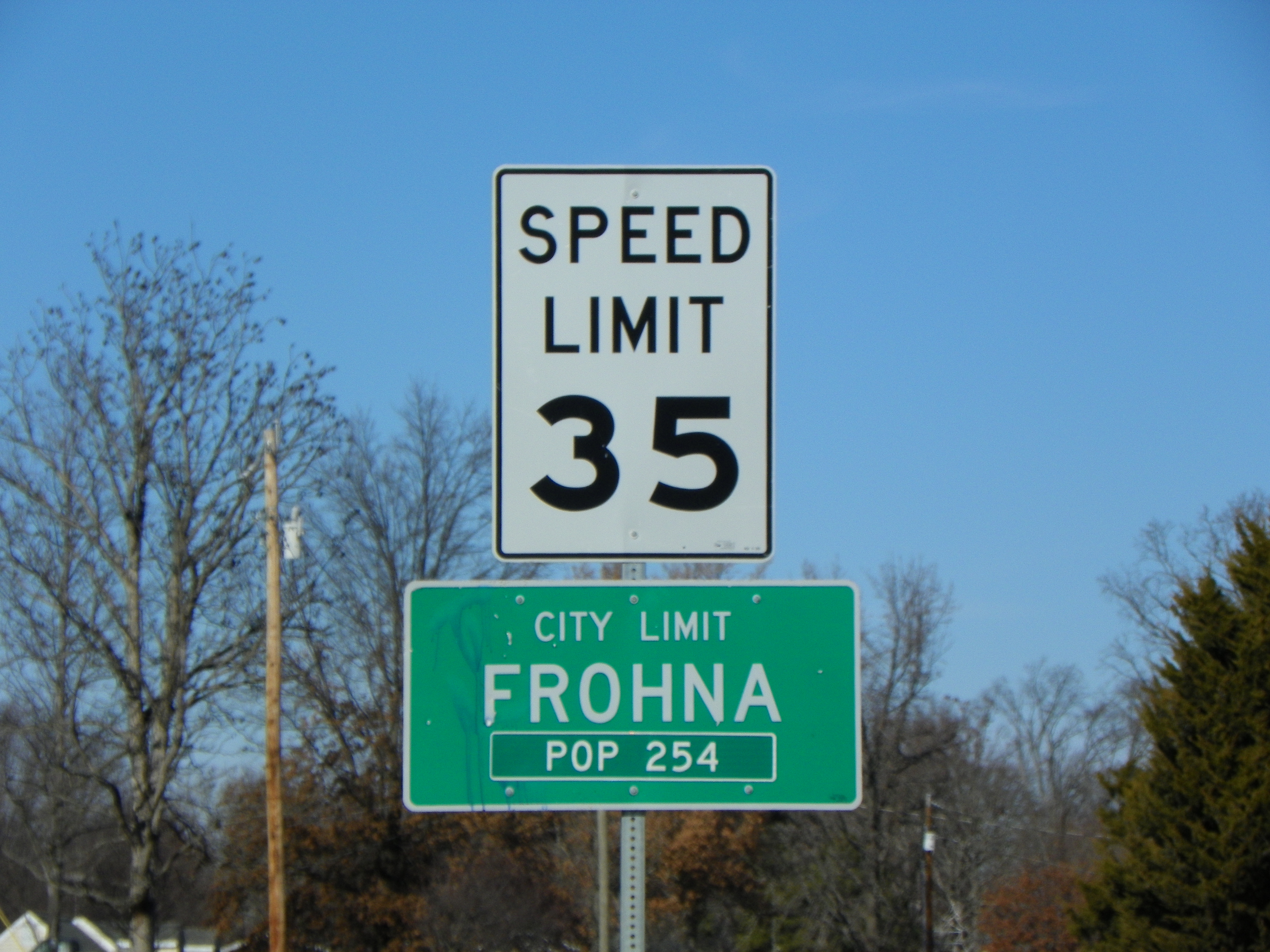
- Frohna, Missouri, road sign

- Location of Frohna, Missouri
- Coordinates: 37°38′15″N 89°37′11″W
- Country: United States
- State: Missouri
- County: Perry
- Township: Brazeau

Area
  - Total: 0.90 sq mi (2.34 km^{2})
  - Land: 0.90 sq mi (2.34 km^{2})
  - Water: 0 sq mi (0.00 km^{2})
- Elevation: 568 ft (173 m)

Population (2020)
  - Total: 245
  - Density: 271.4/sq mi (104.79/km^{2})
- Time zone: UTC-6 (Central (CST))
  - Summer (DST): UTC-5 (CDT)
- ZIP code: 63748
- Area code: 573
- FIPS code: 29-26092
- GNIS feature ID: 2394828

Frohna /ˈfroʊnə/ is a city in Perry County, Missouri, United States. The population was 245 at the 2020 census.

== Name ==
Frohna is named after the town of Niederfrohna (German: Lower Frohna) in the Zwickau district of the German region of Saxony. Although the German colony was initially called Niederfrohna, the Nieder- was eventually dropped from the name.

== History ==
Frohna is one of seven towns and villages in the area founded by German immigrants in 1839. Frohna and the others -- Altenburg, Dresden, Johannisberg, Paitzdorf, Seelitz, and Wittenberg—were all named by settlers for towns in the Saxony region of their native country.

== Geography ==
According to the United States Census Bureau, the city has a total area of 0.90 square miles (2.33 km^{2}), all land.

== Community ==
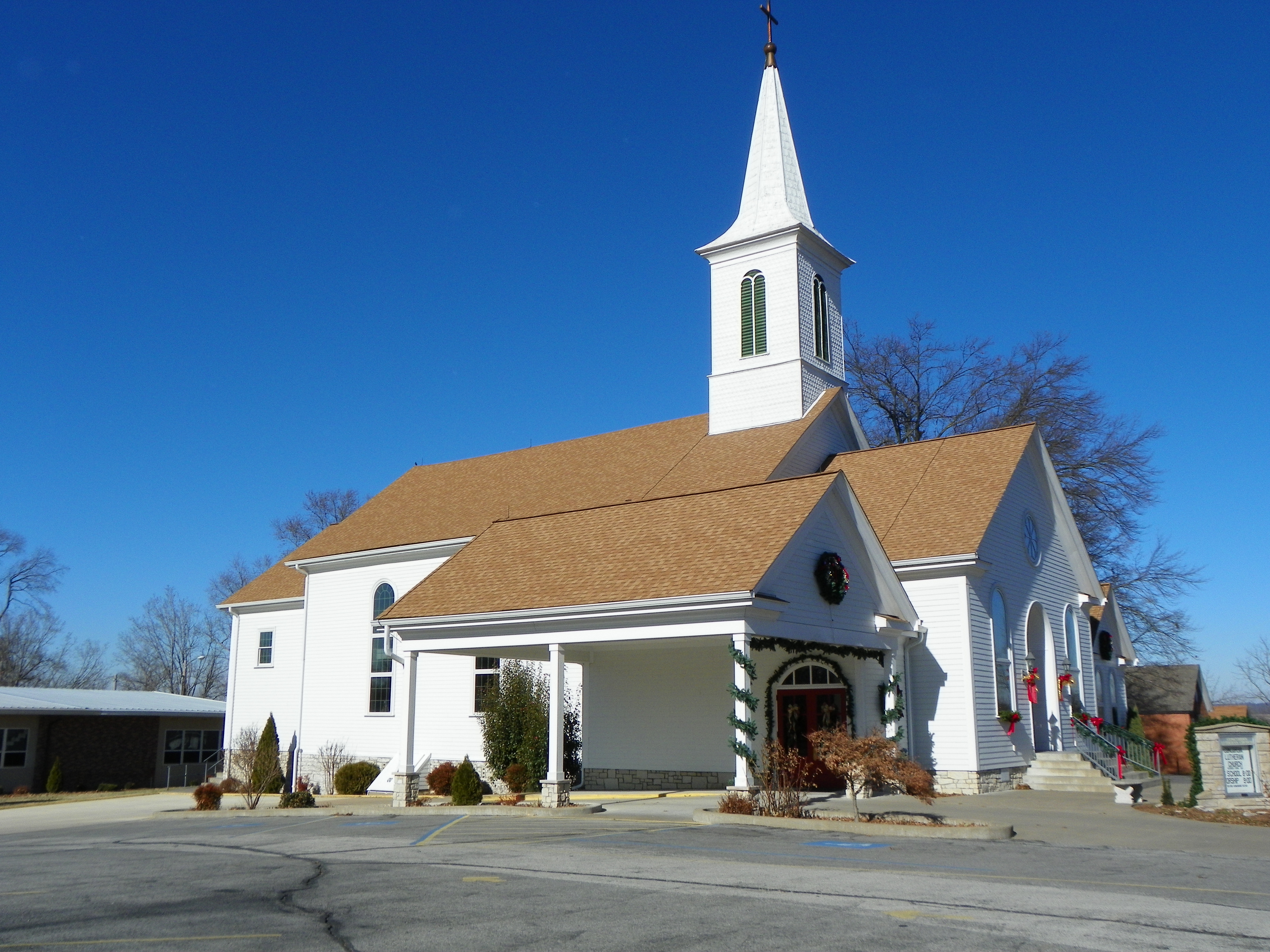
Concordia Lutheran Church

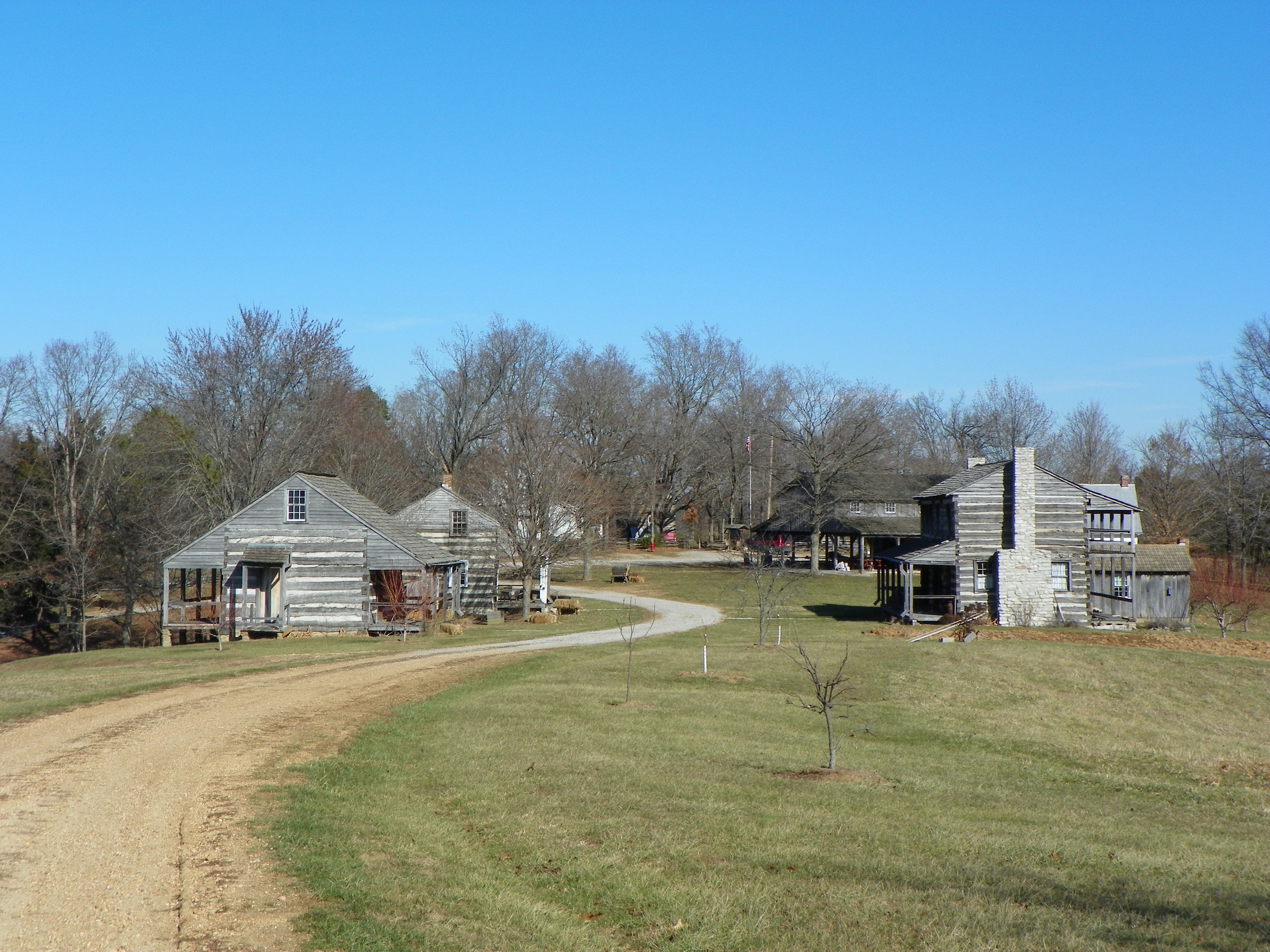
Saxon Lutheran Memorial

Concordia Lutheran Church is a member of the Lutheran Church–Missouri Synod. The Saxon Fall Festival is held every October at the Saxon Lutheran Memorial.

The Saxon Lutheran Memorial is a tribute to the German Lutheran migration of 1838/1839, and features a number of log cabins from that era.

== Demographics ==
Historical population
Census	Pop.	Note	%±
1880	97		—
1950	208		—
1960	216		3.8%
1970	225		4.2%
1980	265		17.8%
1990	162		−38.9%
2000	192		18.5%
2010	254		32.3%
2020	245		−3.5%
U.S. Decennial Census 2020

=== 2010 census ===
As of the census of 2010, there were 254 people, 102 households, and 74 families living in the city. The population density was 282.2 inhabitants per square mile (109.0/km^{2}). There were 115 housing units at an average density of 127.8 per square mile (49.3/km^{2}). The racial makeup of the city was 99.61% White and 0.39% Native American.

There were 102 households, of which 34.3% had children under the age of 18 living with them, 63.7% were married couples living together, 7.8% had a female householder with no husband present, 1.0% had a male householder with no wife present, and 27.5% were non-families. 25.5% of all households were made up of individuals, and 13.7% had someone living alone who was 65 years of age or older. The average household size was 2.49 and the average family size was 3.03.

The median age in the city was 39.7 years. 26% of residents were under the age of 18; 7% were between the ages of 18 and 24; 26% were from 25 to 44; 24% were from 45 to 64; and 16.9% were 65 years of age or older. The gender makeup of the city was 51.6% male and 48.4% female.

=== 2000 census ===
As of the census of 2000, there were 192 people, 84 households, and 51 families living in the city. The population density was 327.3 inhabitants per square mile (126.4/km^{2}). There were 91 housing units at an average density of 155.1 per square mile (59.9/km^{2}). The racial makeup of the city was 99.48% White, and 0.52% from two or more races.

There were 84 households, out of which 26.2% had children under the age of 18 living with them, 57.1% were married couples living together, 2.4% had a female householder with no husband present, and 38.1% were non-families. 33.3% of all households were made up of individuals, and 17.9% had someone living alone who was 65 years of age or older. The average household size was 2.29 and the average family size was 2.96.

In the city the population was spread out, with 20.8% under the age of 18, 7.8% from 18 to 24, 25.5% from 25 to 44, 21.9% from 45 to 64, and 24.0% who were 65 years of age or older. The median age was 40 years. For every 100 females there were 115.7 males. For every 100 females age 18 and over, there were 92.4 males.

The median income for a household in the city was $41,635, and the median income for a family was $51,250. Males had a median income of $33,125 versus $20,357 for females. The per capita income for the city was $17,400. About 1.8% of families and 7.0% of the population were below the poverty line, including 8.0% of those under the age of eighteen and 22.0% of those 65 or over.

== Gallery ==
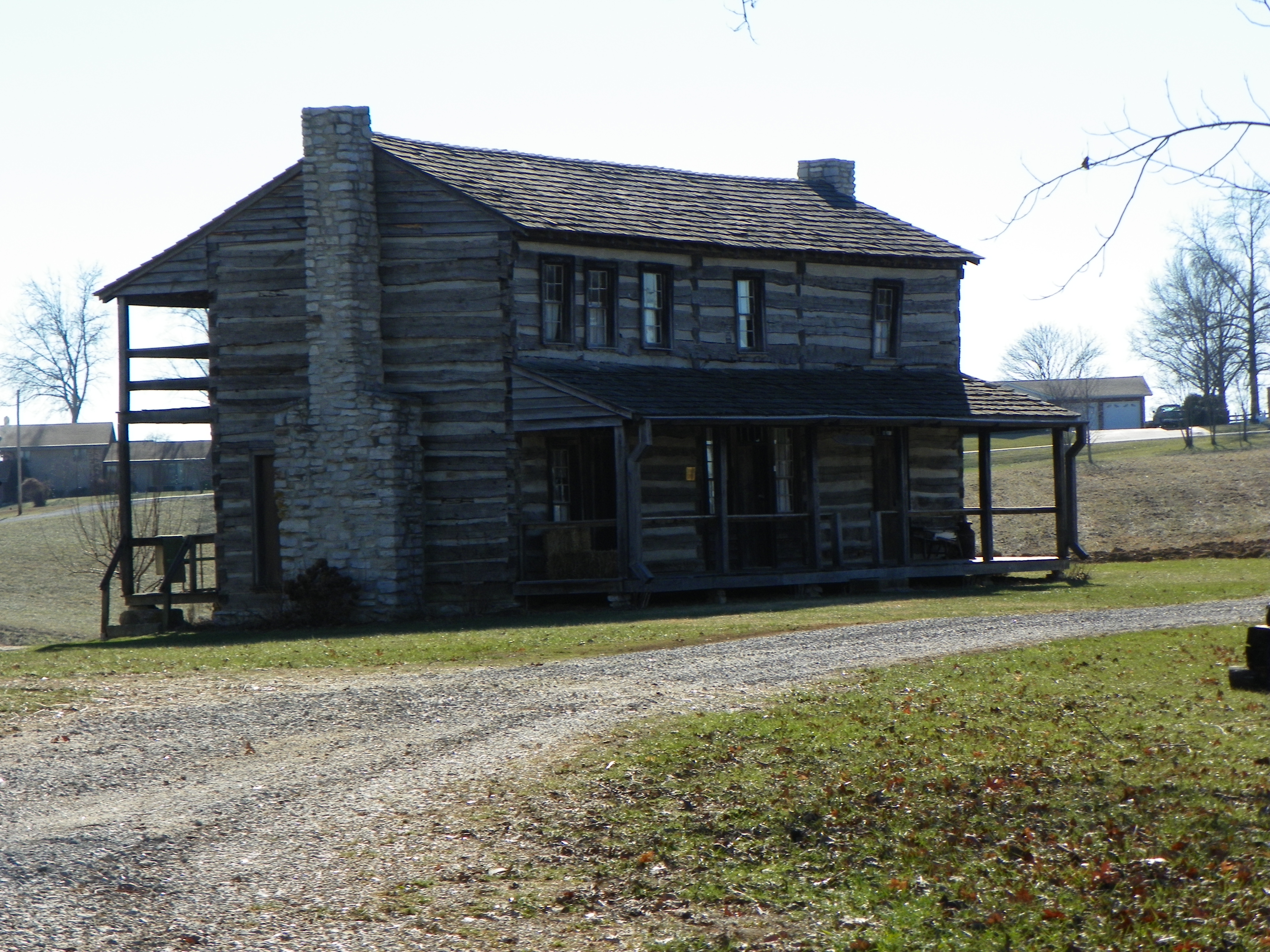
Saxon Lutheran Memorial

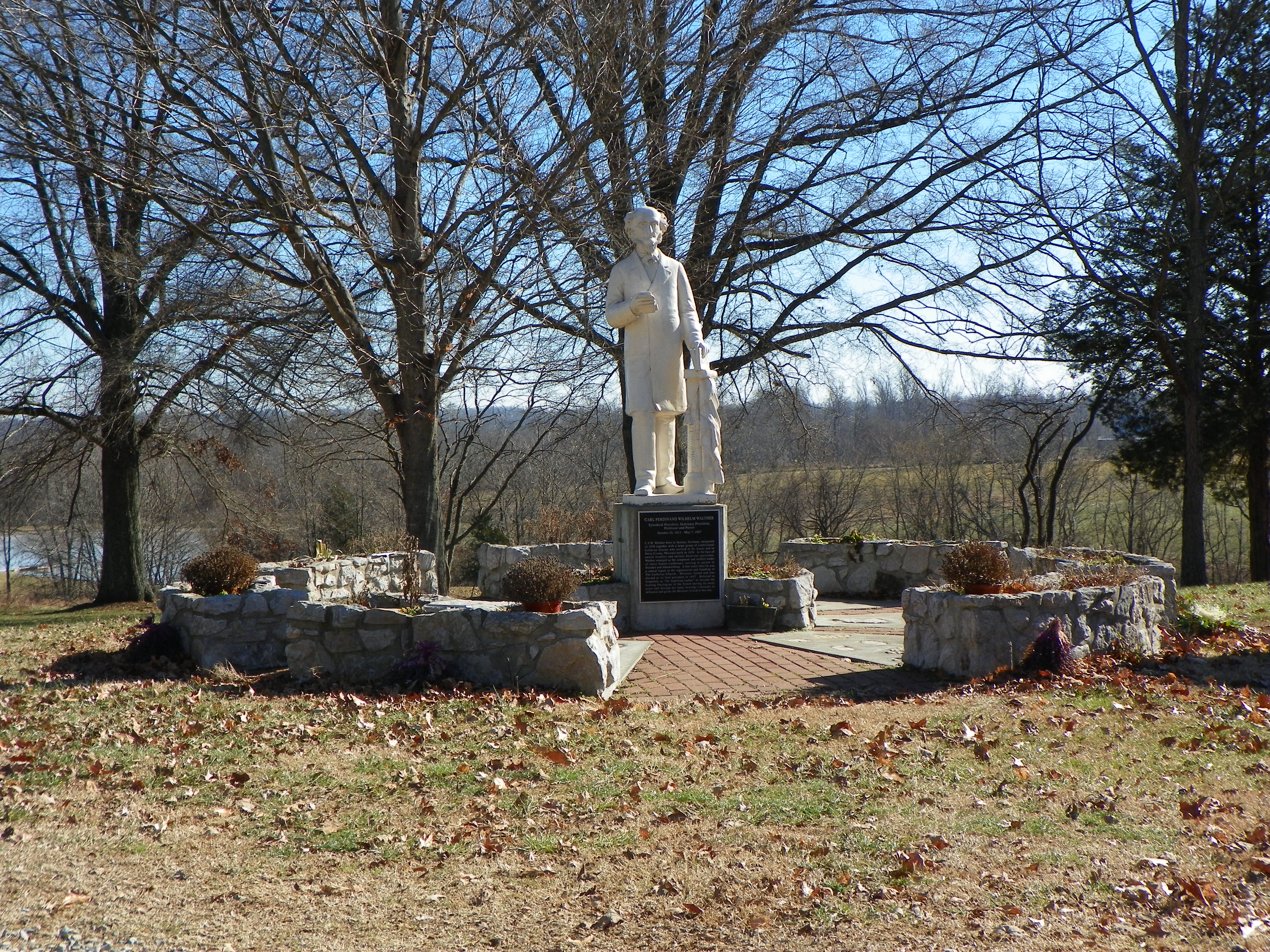
Carl Ferdinand Wilhelm Walther statue

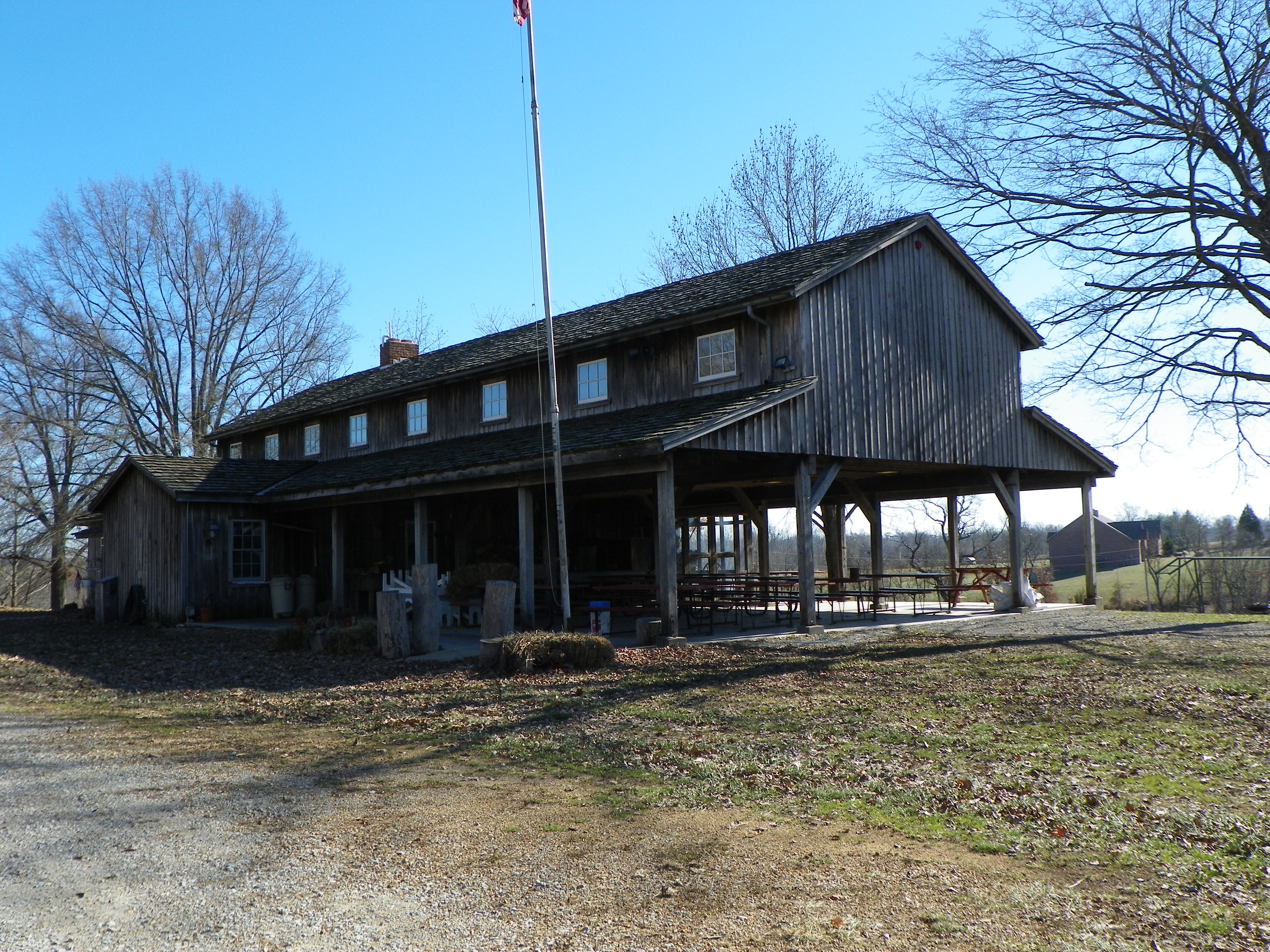
Saxon Memorial

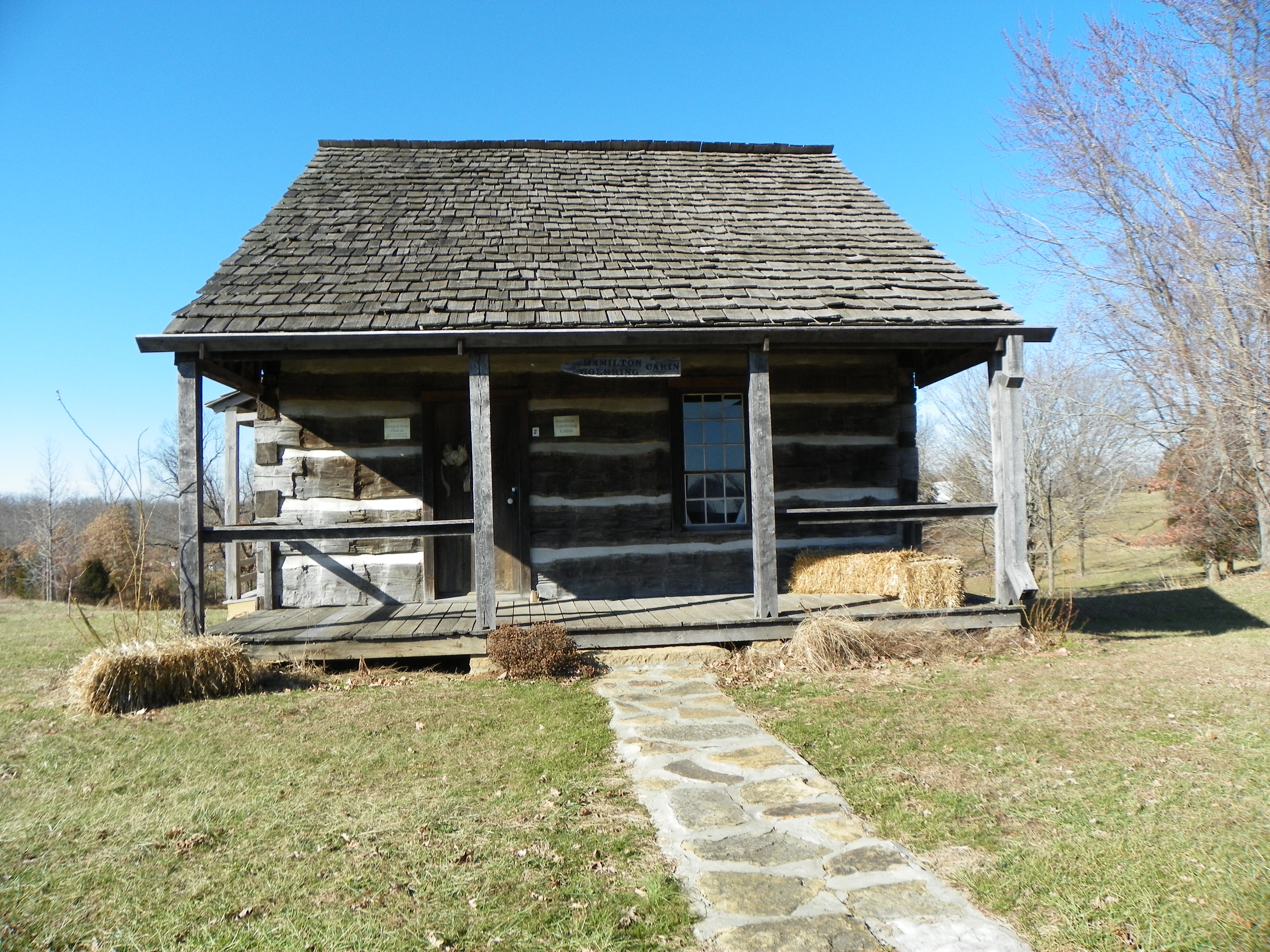
Saxon Lutheran Memorial cabin

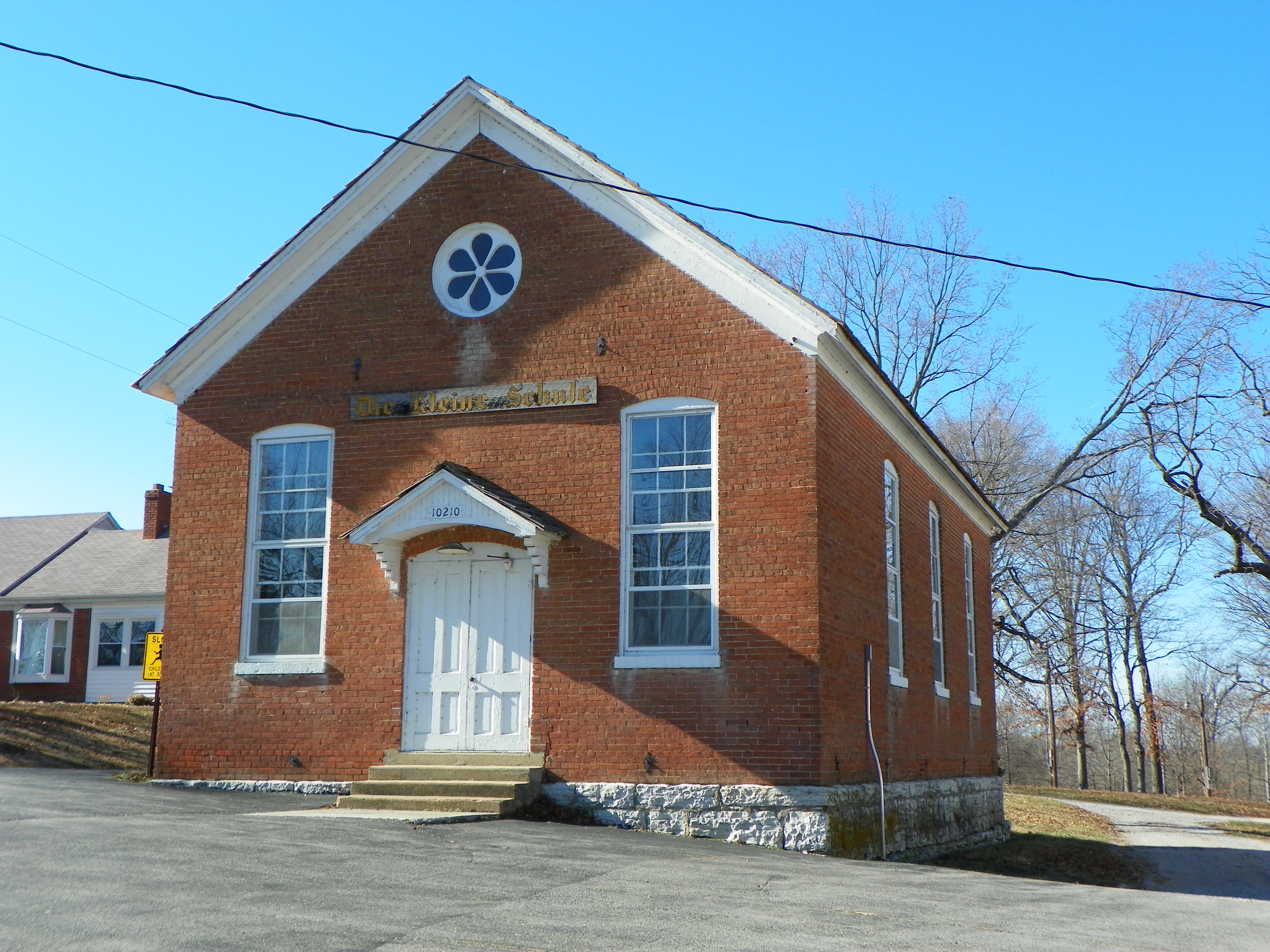
Die Kleine Schule

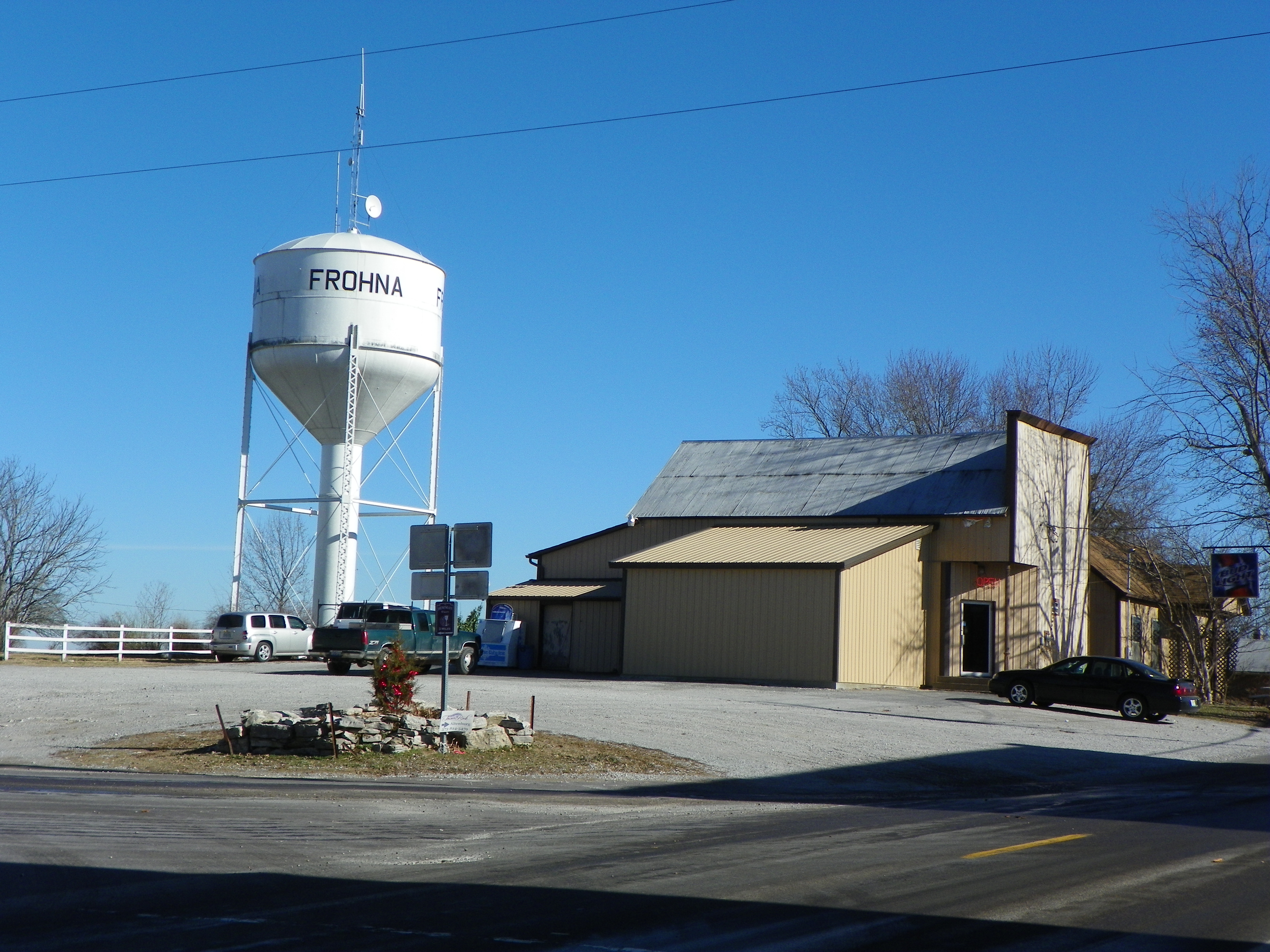
Watertower

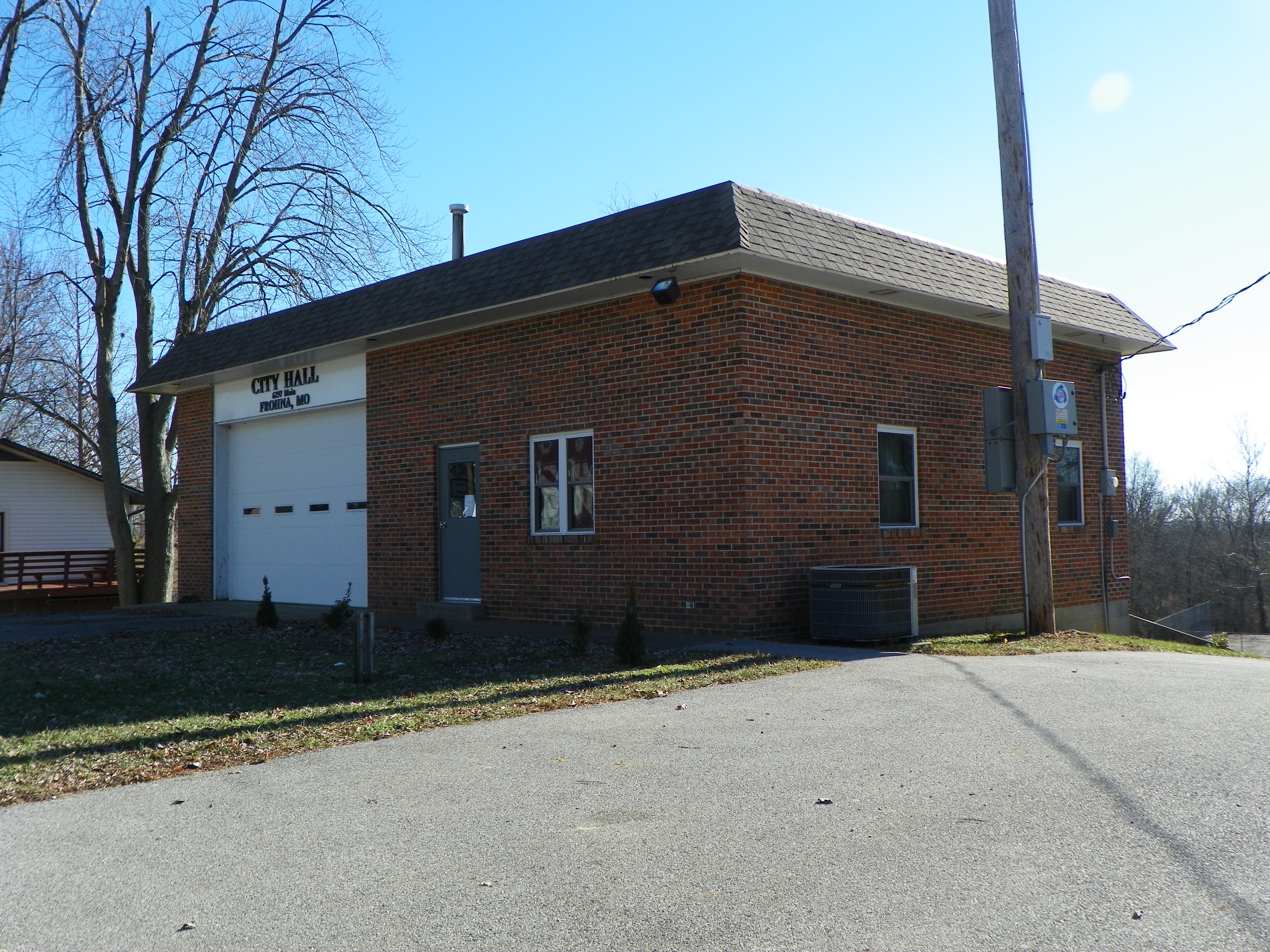
City Hall

== Nearby communities ==
Nearby communities

== Notable people ==
- Sam Barber, singer and songwriter
- Velmer A. Fassel, chemist who developed the inductively coupled plasma associated analytical techniques
