= Concordia Log Cabin College (Altenburg, Missouri) =

Historic house in Missouri, United States

- U.S. National Register of Historic Places
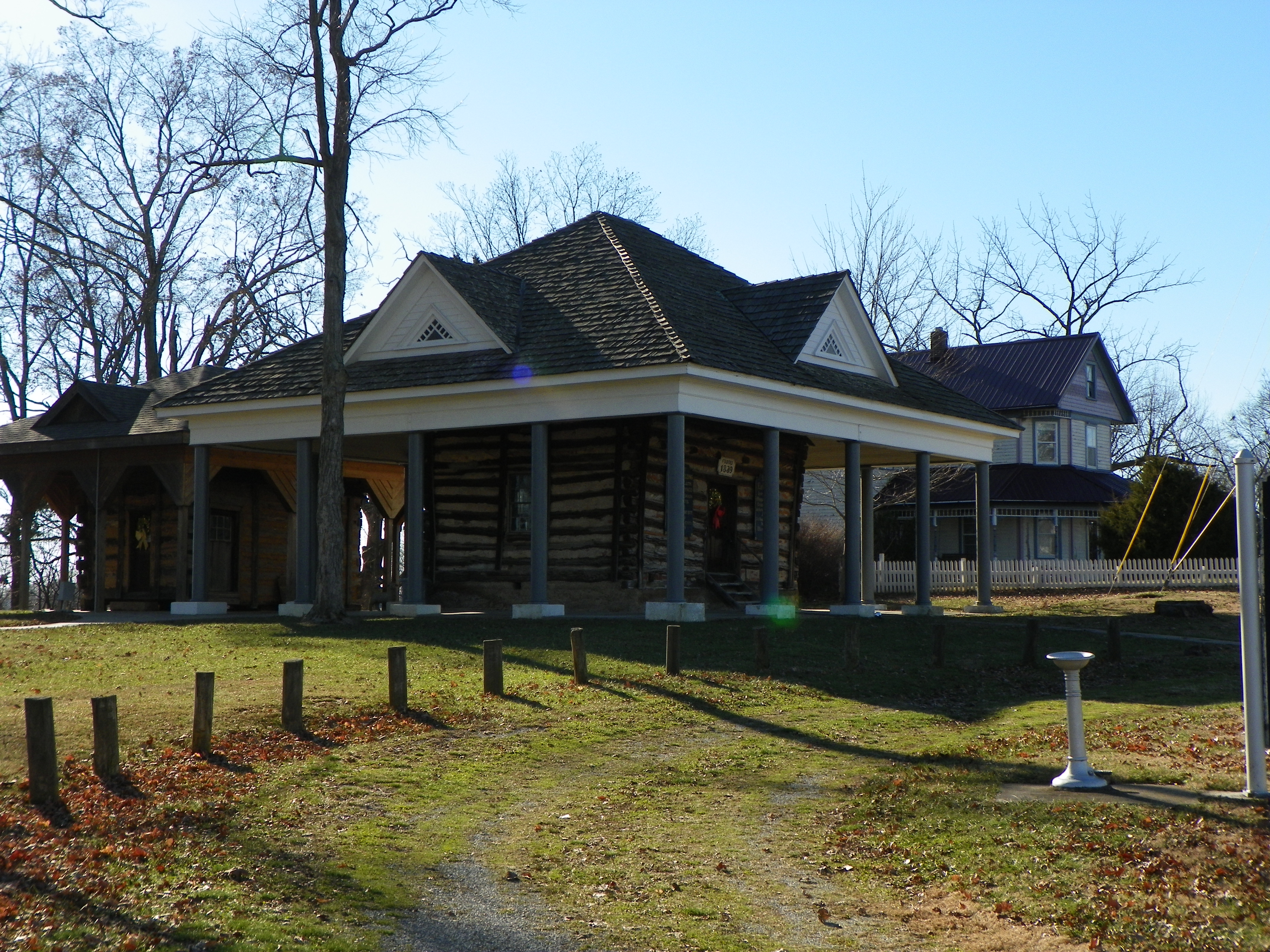

- Location within Missouri Location within the United States
- Location: Main Street, Altenburg, Missouri, 63748, USA
- Coordinates: 37°37′43″N 89°36′09″W
- NRHP reference No.: 78001671
- Added to NRHP: November 21, 1978

Concordia Log Cabin College is a historic site in Altenburg, in Perry County, Missouri. The structure is a log building under a protective shelter situated in the Trinity Lutheran Church maple grove. It served as the first college for the Lutheran Church–Missouri Synod and was first Lutheran college west of the Mississippi River. Today, it commemorates the German Lutheran migration of 1838–1839 and the founding of the Lutheran Church–Missouri Synod, and features two log cabins from that era. The building was listed on the National Register of Historic Places in 1978.

== Construction ==
The log cabin dates to the first settlement of Altenburg, being constructed in 1839, to serve as the first school for the new community. It is now located in the maple grove across from the Trinity Lutheran Church and contains museum exhibits relevant to the history of Altenburg. It was moved to its present location in 1912; and the vertical 2-by-6-inch (51 by 152 mm) oak timbers were attached to the walls to stabilize the structure. The chimney was removed from the cabin at that time; the shelter over the cabin was constructed in 1915. The 20-by-17-foot (6.1 by 5.2 m) cabin is constructed of logs which are only crudely shaped, and have only slight notching. The chinking between the logs is mainly mortar and bricks, with also some stone.

=== Exterior ===
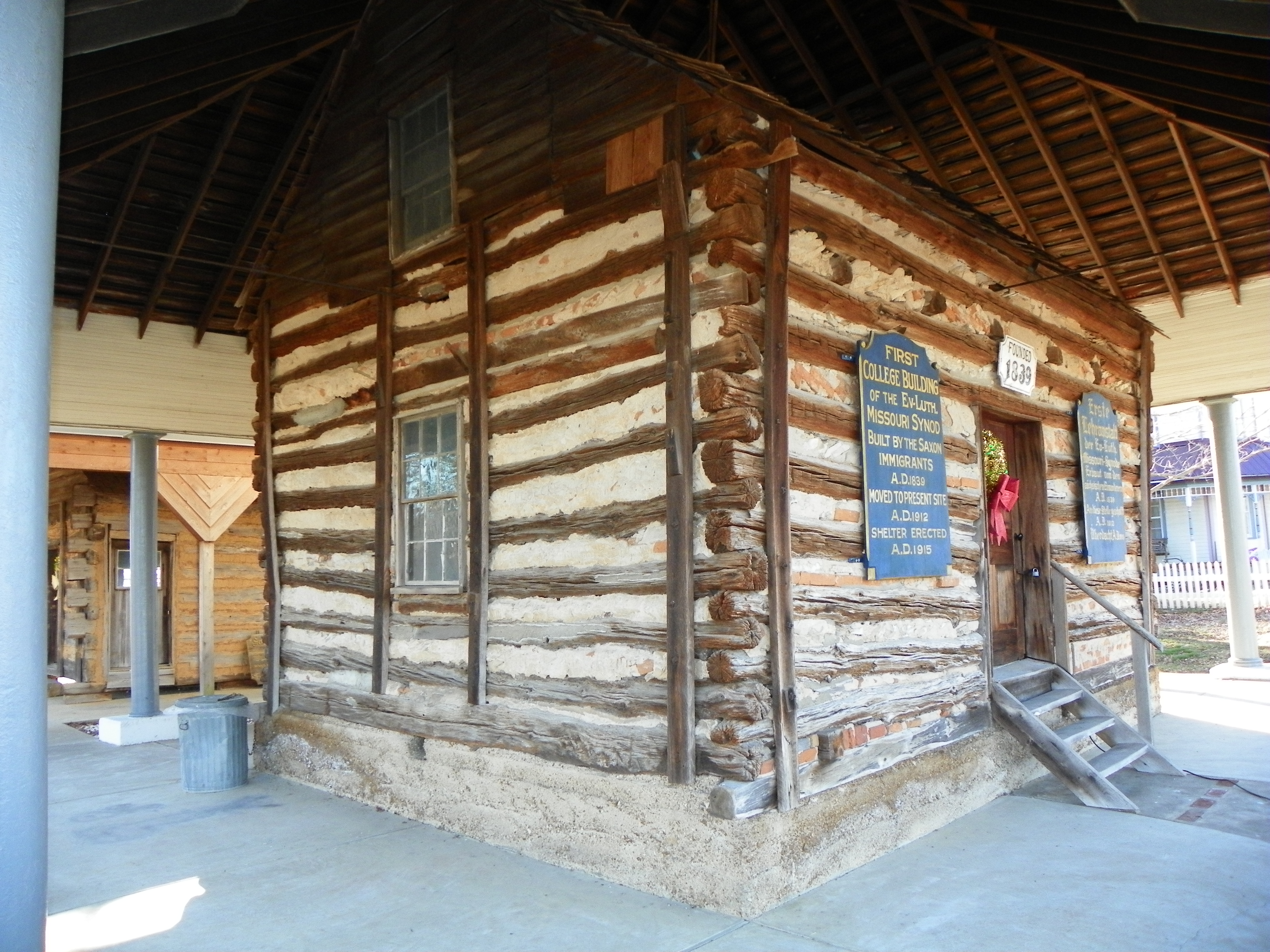
Concordia Cabin College

The cabin measures 20 by 17 feet (6.1 by 5.2 m) and has a ground floor and a loft. The building rests on a concrete foundation. The floor consists of logs, running east–west, flattened on top to receive the floor boards and notched where they rest on the foundation walls. The building itself is constructed of logs which are crudely shaped and vary in diameter from 6 to 10 inches (150 to 250 mm). They show only slight notching and no attempt was made at dovetailing. The chinking between the logs is primarily mortar and bricks. The cabin is ten logs high to the top log. Above the logs, the gable ends consist of unpainted clapboards. The medium pitched ridge roof is sheathed with shake shingles.

The cabin possesses one four panel door, located in the center of the north facade. The centers of the remaining facades are occupied by double-hung sash windows. Each window has six over six lights. Directly above the windows on the gable ends are two additional window openings. A six light fixed window fills the opening on the east end; a board and batten shutter closes the opposite opening. The cabin has no chimney.

=== Interior ===
An east–west running floor of random width tongue and groove oak boards occurs on the ground floor. The walls are not plastered, leaving the logs directly exposed. The cabin has undergone relatively few alterations. It has been moved at least once, perhaps twice. The first time, if it could be agreed upon (refer to Item 8), in 1840-1841 from Dresden to Altenburg—a distance of approximately one mile, in order to be closer to Pastor Loeber's parsonage; the second time in 1912 when it was transported from there a few hundred yards to where it now stands in the church grove of Trinity Lutheran Church in Altenburg. At that time, a chimney was removed and two oak beams were placed under the cabin to assist in transporting it; these remained to become the bottom logs of the cabin after it was permanently in place on the concrete foundation prepared for it in the church grove. It was also at this time that 2-by-6-inch (51 by 152 mm) oak timbers were vertically attached to the walls to stabilize the building during the move.

== History ==
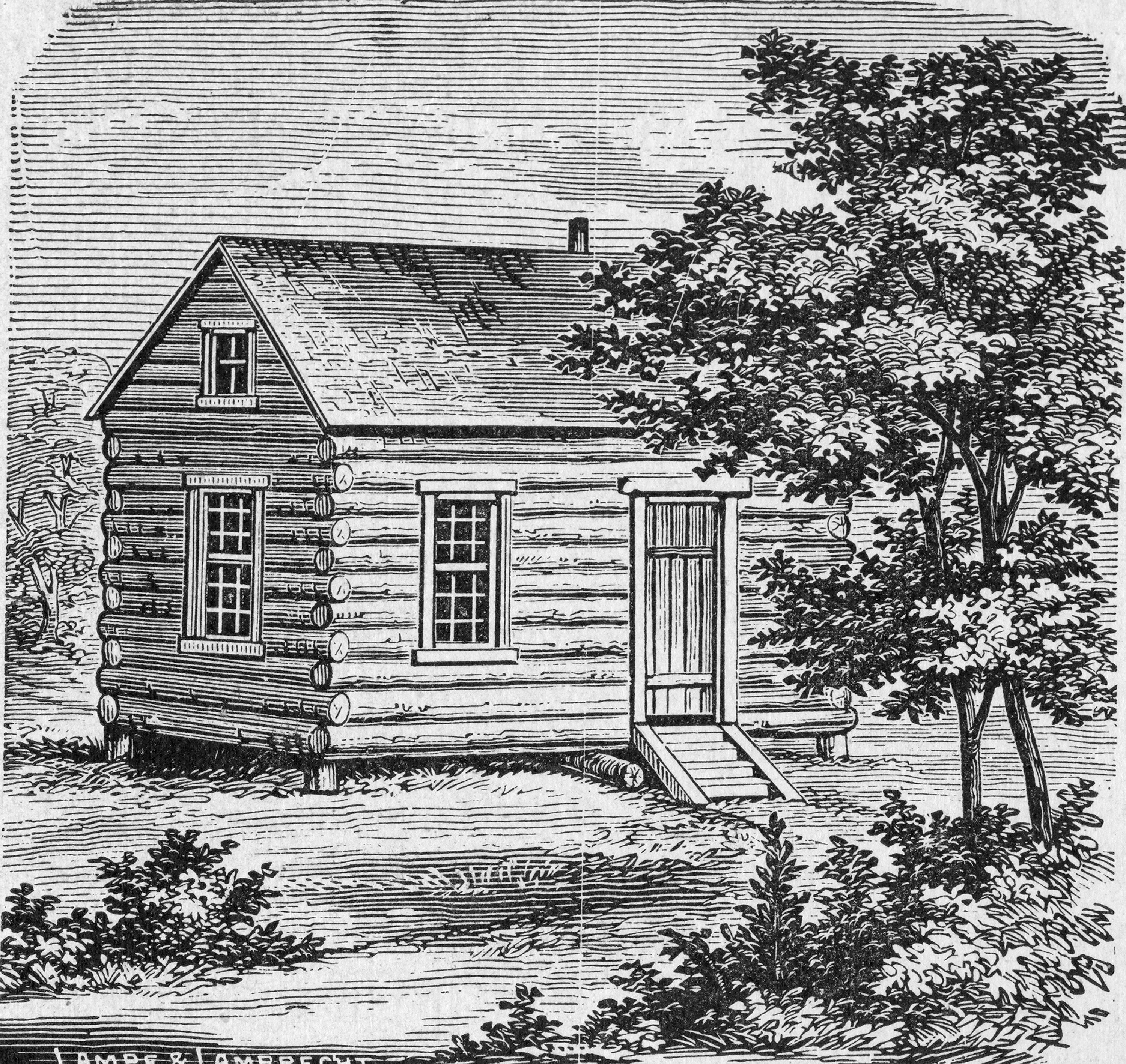
1839 Woodcut Concordia Cabin College

The Concordia Log Cabin College is significant as the first college and seminary of the Lutheran Church–Missouri Synod educational system. It is also believed to be where the Altenburg Debates were held. Missouri was the destination of the Saxon or Stephanite Immigration of 1838. This unique migration was made up of Germans, principally from the Kingdom of Saxony, who had embraced the teachings and leadership of Martin Stephan. From his pulpit in St. John's Church in Dresden, Stephan preached an orthodox brand of Lutheranism that ran counter to the trend towards rationalism that for various reasons was increasingly dominating the religious life of Saxony. Stephan was not a great pulpit orator, but he did possess an unusual sensitivity to the spiritual needs of people and between 1823 and 1837 he attracted a large following. His adherents included not only farmers and craftsmen, but also lawyers, teachers, merchants, high ranking government officials and clergy.

The log cabin was constructed in 1839 to serve as the first school for the new community. The school served 11 students - seven boys and four girls – and was styled after the German Gymnasium schools.

During the years 1841–1843, Gotthold Heinrich Loeber and Theodor Brohm conducted the affairs of the school. Brohm was then called to New York leaving Loeber to carry on responsibility for half a year. In 1841, the school's enrollment had dropped to eight pupils; two years later, it had dwindled to five. Loeber managed somehow to keep the school alive. It had become obvious by 1843 that the school must be placed on a sound financial basis if it was to survive. An agreement was made that the Trinity congregation and the Perry County congregations would assume joint responsibility for the maintenance of the school. Trinity was to pay the bills, Perry County would provide food and firewood. Seven dollars monthly was provided by St. Louis to sustain the college. Trinity also recommended John Goenner as a prospective teacher to relieve Loeber.

In late April, 1847, at a meeting in Chicago, the Evangelical Lutheran Synod of Missouri, Ohio and Other States was organized with C. F. W. Walther as its first president. Control of the seminary then passed to the synod, having been relinquished by the Trinity congregation, with the understanding that the school be moved to St. Louis. In Altenburg, Loeber and his congregation had no quarrel with synodical control of the college, but they were reluctant to see it taken away from them. At the synod's third convention in 1849, however, it was insisted that the transfer be made. Loeber did not live to see the move. While the college during these ten years was small and always on the verge of collapse, it persevered and produced five pastors. It was also a unifying factor, giving the ministers and congregations of St. Louis and Perry County a common objective and contributing to the formation of the Missouri Synod. As for the cabin, it was sold at auction in 1855 by the heirs of Gotthold Loeber. This sale was probably confirmed by an 1859 quit claim deed transferring the cabin and 4.3 acre lot from the Loeber heirs to Gottlieb Funke for $80.00. Funke lived there for the next 38 years. His will in 1893 provided that the cabin and lot be donated to the church in consideration of the Altenburg congregation's having cared for him during his illness. In 1912, at the suggestion of Rev. H. Schmidt, the cabin was moved to the church grove in Altenburg. A fund raising drive throughout the synod paid for the protective shelter erected three years later.

== Education ==
December 9, 1839, was the first day of classes. The eleven students who reported that day seven boys and four girls were greeted with an ambitious and rich educational program. Their teachers received no compensation for the school had no finances, but they were well trained in European universities and deeply convinced of the importance and necessity of a sound education. Their institution was patterned after the gymnasium, the Latin grammar school of Saxony, and their program was that advocated for centuries by Christian humanists. The subjects taught were: Latin, Greek, Hebrew, German, French, English, History, Geography, Mathematics, Physics, Natural History, Philosophy, Music and Drawing.

== Gallery ==
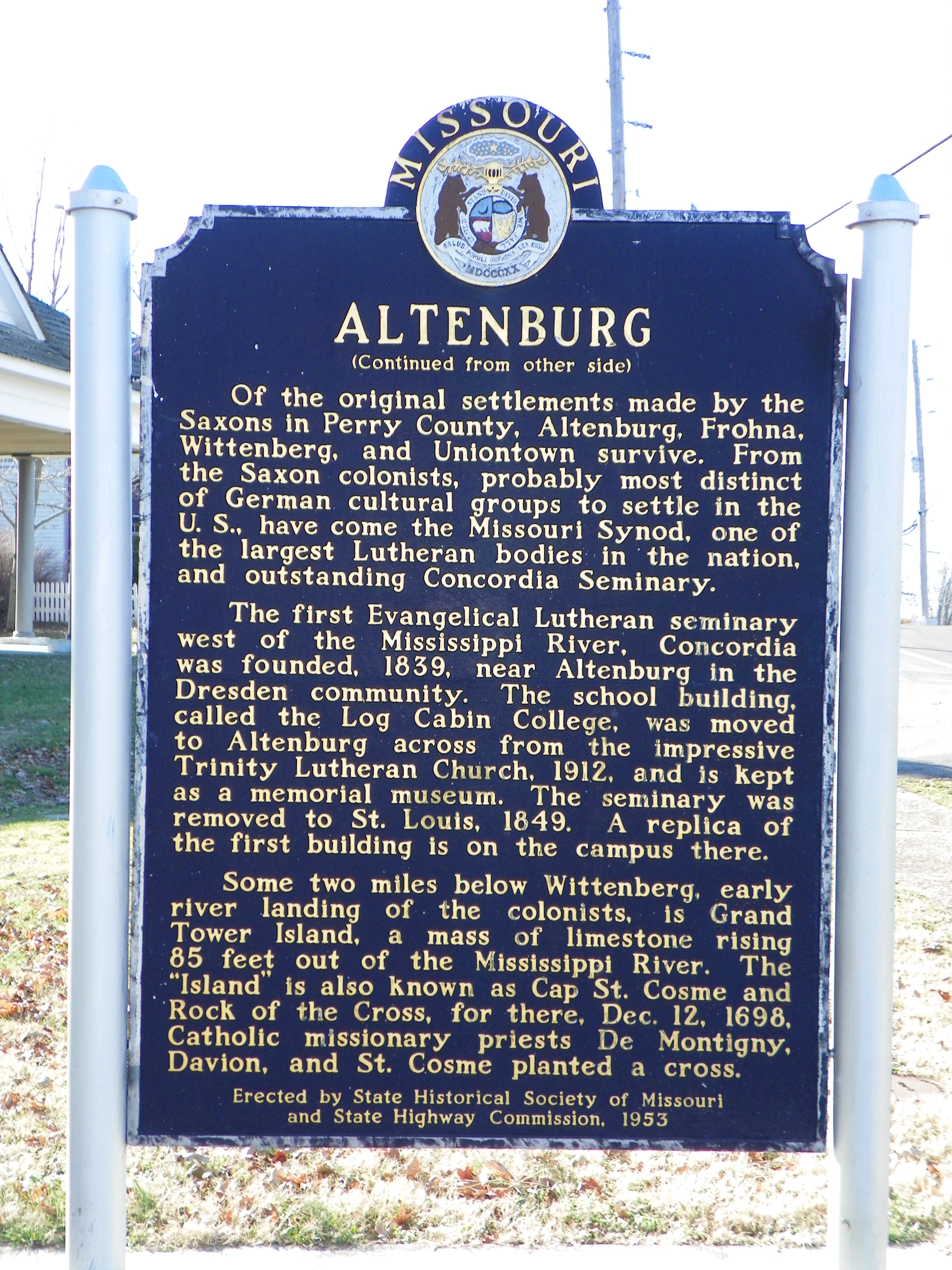
Monument sign 1

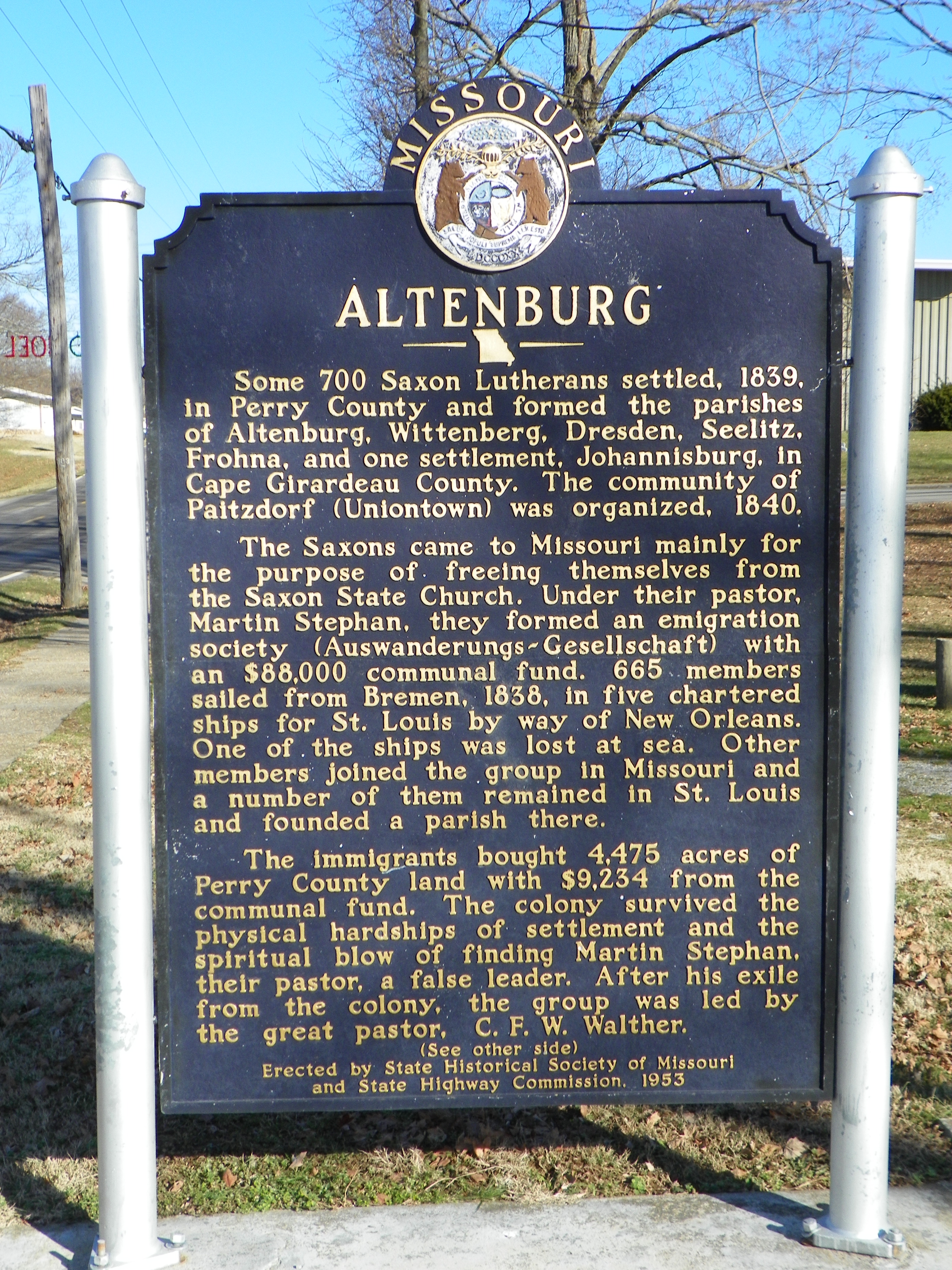
Monument sign 2

== See also ==
- Saxon Lutheran Memorial
