= Velmer A. Fassel =

American chemist (1919–1998)

- Born: 26 April 1919; Frohna, Missouri
- Died: 4 March 1998 (aged 78); San Diego, California
- Education: Iowa State University; Southeast Missouri State College
- Known for: ICP and ICP-MS
- Scientific career
- Fields: Chemist
- Workplaces: Iowa State University; Ames Laboratory

Velmer A. Fassel (26 April 1919 – 4 March 1998) was an American chemist who developed the inductively coupled plasma (ICP) and demonstrated its use as ion source for mass spectrometry.

== Early life and education ==
- 1941 B.A. Southeast Missouri State College
- 1947 Ph.D. Iowa State University

== Research interests ==
- Atomic spectroscopy

== Awards ==
- 1971 Anachem Award
