= Trinity Lutheran Church (Altenburg, Missouri) =

Trinity Lutheran Church, Altenburg, Missouri
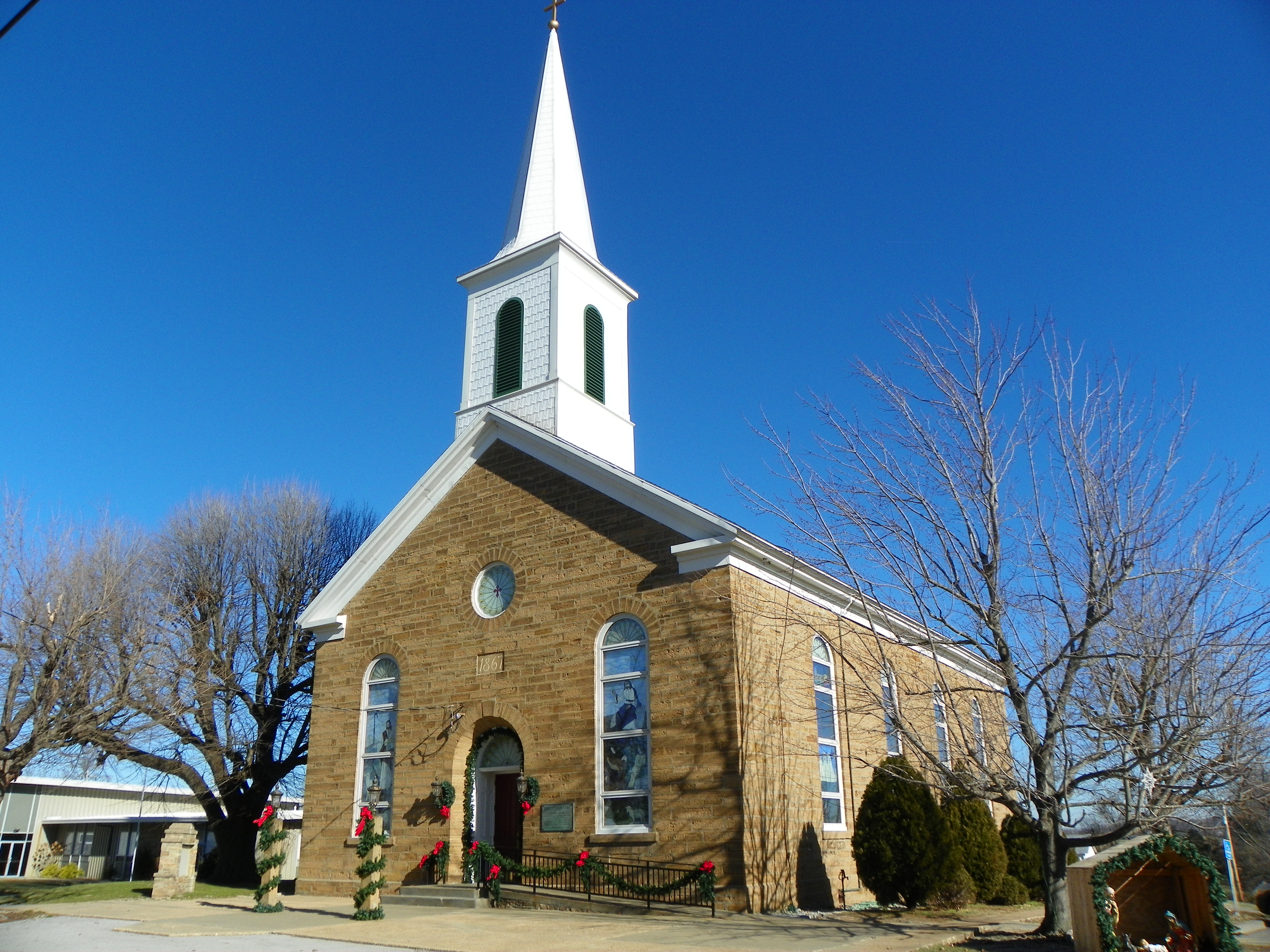

- Location within Missouri
- 37°38′26″N 89°37′09″W
- Location: 57 Church Street, Altenburg, Missouri 63732
- Country: United States
- Denomination: Lutheran Church–Missouri Synod

History
- Founded: 1839
- Founder: Pastor Ernst Gerhard Wilhelm Keyl

Administration
- District: Missouri District

Trinity Lutheran Church is a member congregation of the Lutheran Church–Missouri Synod (LCMS) in Altenburg, Missouri.

== History ==
Trinity Church, originally known as Trinity Evangelical Lutheran Church, was the first Lutheran church in Altenburg, and was established by Gotthold Heinrich Loeber (1797–1849) in a log cabin in 1839. This log cabin, also utilized as a school building, was moved to a new site in 1912, and in 1979 was placed on the National Register of Historic Places.

The cornerstone for the second church building was laid on March 14, 1844. This limestone building, which was both a school and a church, was completed in 1845, under Pastor Loeber. He helped start the Lutheran School and Seminary at Altenburg, which was functioning by 1841 and possibly as early as 1839. This school ultimately developed into Concordia Seminary, which relocated to St. Louis in 1849.

The second church building of Trinity was dedicated in 1845. This one story structure served as the parish church until 1867, when the present church was built. Thereafter it served as a school for the upper grades for 102 years until 1969, when a new school was dedicated. Following the construction of the new school, the original limestone church was converted into a museum that displays local church items. The present church building, dedicated in 1867, also served as convention headquarters for the Western District of the LCMS on nine occasions. The altar, pulpit, and baptismal font are original furnishings of 1867. The crucifix on the altar was made in Oberammergau, Germany, and was brought along in 1839, as were the baptismal tray and pitcher, both dated 1838.

Georg Albert Schieferdecker (1815–1891) took over as pastor of Trinity in 1850 after Loeber's death the previous year. Schieferdecker became involved in the Chiliasm (German Chiliastenstreit) schism in 1857-1858, resulting in his expulsion from the LCMS. Upon his expulsion, one third of the membership followed him to found Immanuel Lutheran Church, which was associated with the Evangelical Lutheran Synod of Iowa.

The third church building was constructed under the direction of J. P. Beyer. The cornerstone for this church was laid in 1866. Stone was hauled by horse-drawn wagon from Bodenshatz Branch creek, three miles (4.8 km) east of the church site. The third church was dedicated in 1867.

The design of the church with the pulpit situated above the altar is typical 18th century German style church architecture. The specific model for Trinity is said to have been St. John's Lutheran Church in New Minden, Illinois. The total cost of the church was $15,280.60, which was not paid off until 1878. A new clapboard roof of 26,000 clapboards was constructed in 1887 for $356.25. The tin ceiling in the church was installed in 1894 for $400. The name of the church was officially changed from the Evangelical Lutheran Brethren, U.A.C., to Trinity Lutheran Brethren, U.A.C., in 1918.

A severe storm struck the area and the church on May 8, 2009, destroying the church’s steeple. The steeple was replaced on September 30, 2009, at a cost between $160,000 and $170,000.

== Heritage Center ==
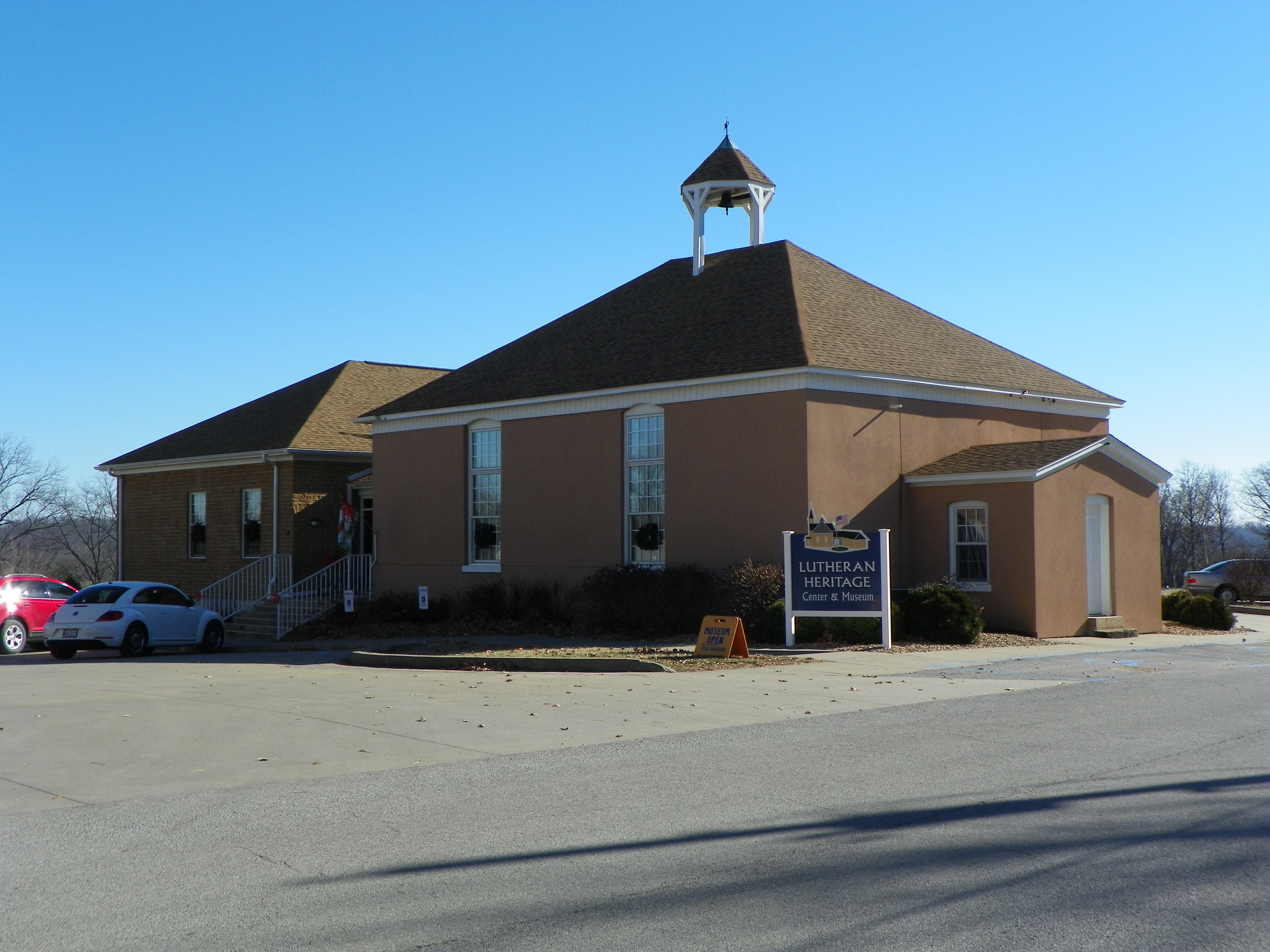
Heritage Center

The Lutheran Heritage Center and Museum was constructed in 2005. The Museum interprets the 1838-39 Saxon Lutheran immigration from Germany to Perry County, Missouri, including the history of the seven original German colonies. It also follows the origins of the Lutheran Church in eastern Perry County and the regional German-American culture. The museum features the original limestone church that served as the parish church until 1867, and thereafter as the “Big School” for the upper grades until 1969. The center and museum also feature a genealogical research center.

== Concordia College ==
Concordia College's history goes back to Martin Stephan and the Saxon Lutheran Immigration of 1838-39. This unique migration was made up of Germans, principally from the Kingdom of Saxony, who had embraced the teachings of Martin Stephan. From his pulpit in St. John's Church in Dresden he preached an orthodox brand of Lutheranism that ran counter to the trend of rationalism that was prevalent in the State Church of Saxony.

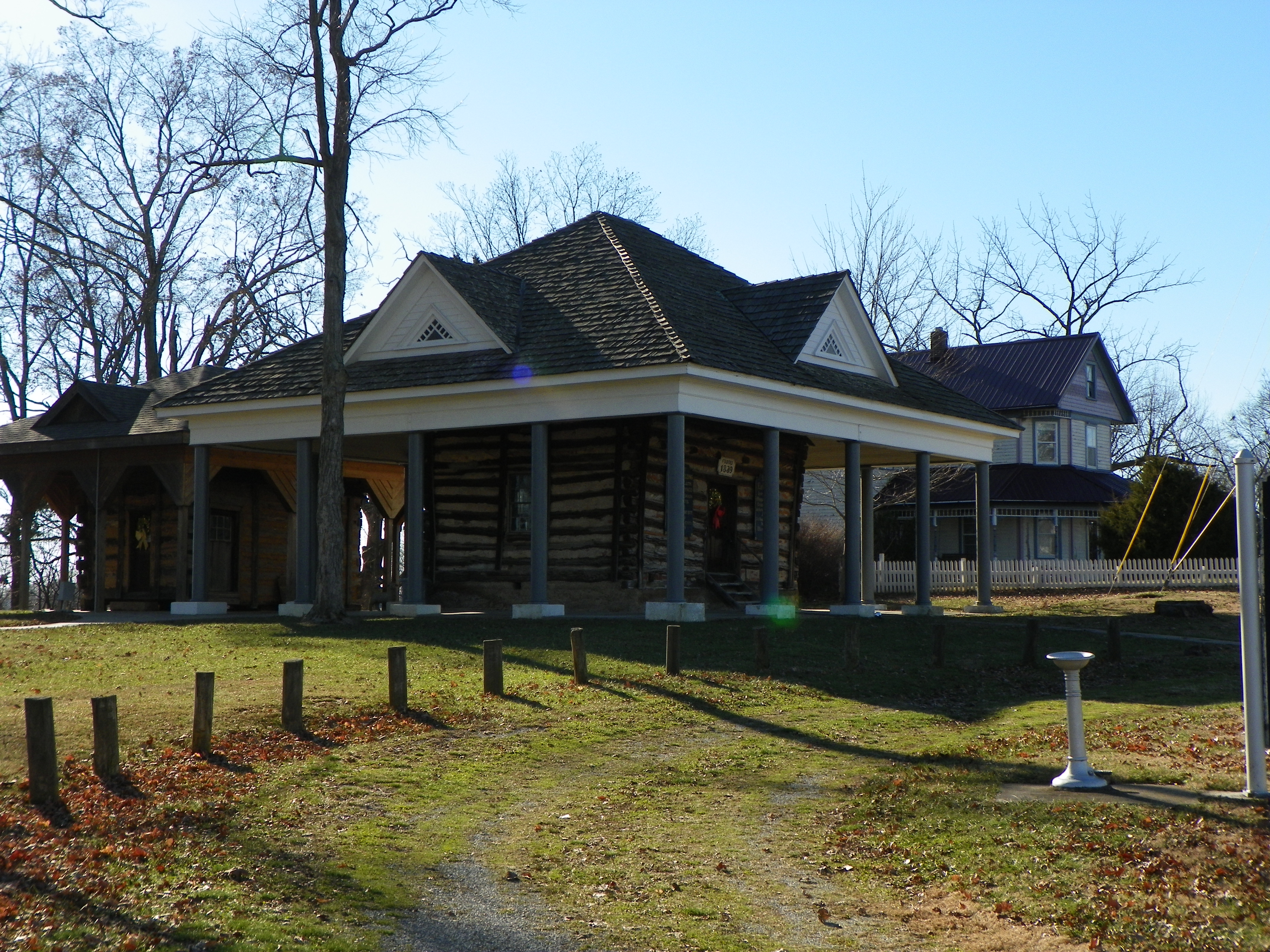
Concordia College Cabin

The log cabin dates to the first settlement of Altenburg. Constructed in 1839, it served as the first school for the new community. It is located in the maple grove across from the Trinity Lutheran Church and contains museum exhibits relevant to the history of Altenburg. It was moved to its present location in 1912. The vertical oak 2-by-6-inch (51 mm × 152 mm) timbers were attached to the walls to stabilize the structure. The chimney was removed from the cabin at that time. The shelter providing protection over the cabin was constructed in 1915. The 20-by-17-foot (6.1 m × 5.2 m) cabin is constructed of oak logs which are only crudely shaped, and have only slight notching. The chinking between the logs is mainly mortar and bricks, and some stone.

== Gallery ==
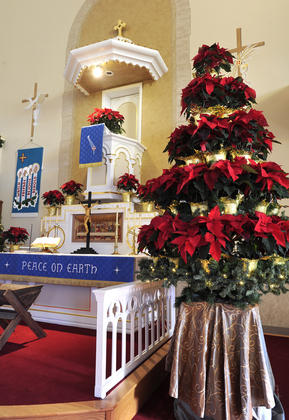
Church altar
