= Altenburg, Missouri =

- City
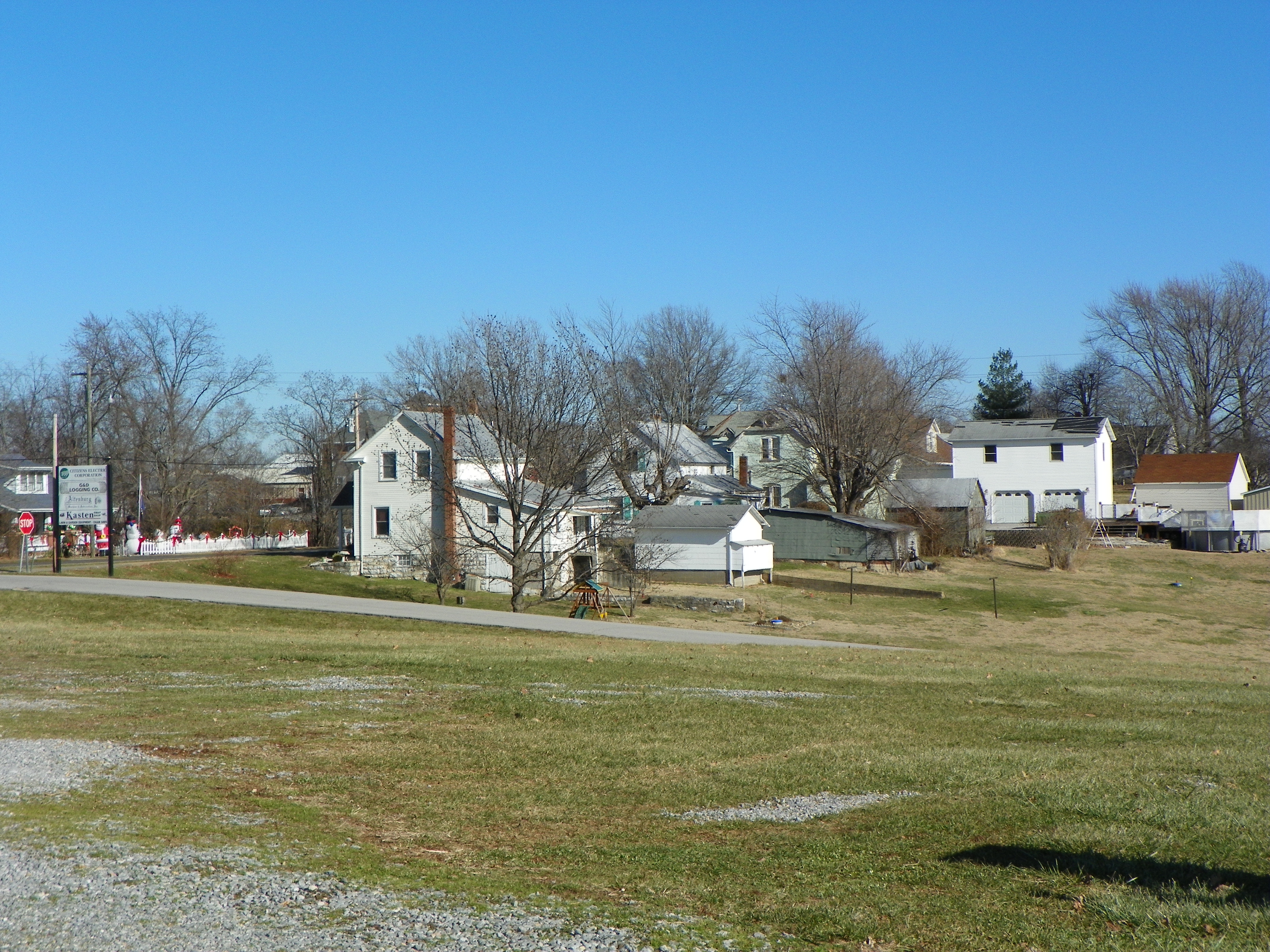
- Altenburg

- Location of Altenburg, Missouri
- Coordinates: 37°37′50″N 89°35′09″W
- Country: United States
- State: Missouri
- County: Perry
- Township: Brazeau
- Incorporated: 1870
- Named after: Saxe-Altenburg, Germany

Area
  - Total: 1.05 sq mi (2.72 km^{2})
  - Land: 1.05 sq mi (2.72 km^{2})
  - Water: 0 sq mi (0.00 km^{2})
- Elevation: 584 ft (178 m)

Population (2020)
  - Total: 341
  - Density: 324.8/sq mi (125.41/km^{2})
- Time zone: UTC-6 (Central (CST))
  - Summer (DST): UTC-5 (CDT)
- ZIP code: 63732
- Area code: 573
- FIPS code: 29-00928
- GNIS feature ID: 2393934

Altenburg (/ˈæltənbɜːrɡ/ AL-tən-burg) is a city in Perry County, Missouri, United States. The population was 341 at the 2020 census.

== History ==
Altenburg (German for "Old Castle") was laid out and platted in 1839 by a colony of Lutherans. It was named after the Duchy of Saxe-Altenburg from where many of its settlers came, and not the city of Altenburg which does not seem to have sent a single colonist.

Altenburg is one of seven towns and villages in the area founded by German Lutheran immigrants in 1839. Altenburg and the other communities—Dresden, Frohna, Johannisberg, Paitzdorf, Seelitz, and Wittenberg—were all named by settlers for towns in the Saxony region of their native country. These settlers would form the backbone of what would later become the Lutheran Church–Missouri Synod. Trinity Lutheran Church was established in 1839 in a log cabin, and was later replaced by a limestone, and then a frame church. Soon after arriving, the immigrants constructed a school in Altenburg. Made of native timber, this "Log Cabin College" introduced the new idea of a co-educational school, a rarity at the time. Today, Altenburg is home to the Lutheran Heritage Center and Museum, established in 1985. Tourists can explore several mid-19th century buildings that remain in the community as well as the Heritage Center's exhibition hall as well as the reading room and research library.

== Geography ==
According to the United States Census Bureau, the city has a total area of 1.05 square miles (2.72 km^{2}), all land.

== Demographics ==
Historical population
| Census | Pop. | Note | %± |
|---|---|---|---|
| 1870 | 200 | | — |
| 1880 | 234 | | 17.0% |
| 1890 | 183 | | −21.8% |
| 1900 | 222 | | 21.3% |
| 1910 | 279 | | 25.7% |
| 1920 | 313 | | 12.2% |
| 1930 | 289 | | −7.7% |
| 1940 | 264 | | −8.7% |
| 1950 | 272 | | 3.0% |
| 1960 | 260 | | −4.4% |
| 1970 | 277 | | 6.5% |
| 1980 | 280 | | 1.1% |
| 1990 | 307 | | 9.6% |
| 2000 | 309 | | 0.7% |
| 2010 | 352 | | 13.9% |
| 2020 | 341 | | −3.1% |
U.S. Decennial Census 2020

=== 2010 census ===
As of the census of 2010, there were 352 people, 138 households, and 97 families living in the city. The population density was 335.2 inhabitants per square mile (129.4/km^{2}). There were 152 housing units at an average density of 144.8 per square mile (55.9/km^{2}). The racial makeup of the city was 99.15% White, 0.28% Black or African American, and 0.57% from two or more races.

There were 138 households, of which 39.9% had children under the age of 18 living with them, 58.7% were married couples living together, 6.5% had a female householder with no husband present, 5.1% had a male householder with no wife present, and 29.7% were non-families. 26.8% of all households were made up of individuals, and 18.1% had someone living alone who was 65 years of age or older. The average household size was 2.55 and the average family size was 3.04.

The median age in the city was 37 years. 27% of residents were under the age of 18; 7.9% were between the ages of 18 and 24; 28.5% were from 25 to 44; 23% were from 45 to 64; and 13.6% were 65 years of age or older. The gender makeup of the city was 48.6% male and 51.4% female.

=== 2000 census ===
As of the census of 2000, there were 309 people, 126 households, and 86 families living in the city. The population density was 323.4 inhabitants per square mile (124.9/km^{2}). There were 140 housing units at an average density of 146.5 per square mile (56.6/km^{2}). The racial makeup of the city was 99.35% White, and 0.65% from two or more races.

There were 126 households, out of which 35.7% had children under the age of 18 living with them, 61.9% were married couples living together, 5.6% had a female householder with no husband present, and 31.0% were non-families. 27.8% of all households were made up of individuals, and 16.7% had someone living alone who was 65 years of age or older. The average household size was 2.45 and the average family size was 3.05.

In the city the population was spread out, with 25.6% under the age of 18, 6.8% from 18 to 24, 30.7% from 25 to 44, 18.8% from 45 to 64, and 18.1% who were 65 years of age or older. The median age was 36 years. For every 100 females there were 108.8 males. For every 100 females age 18 and over, there were 107.2 males.

The median income for a household in the city was $40,417, and the median income for a family was $46,136. Males had a median income of $33,125 versus $20,208 for females. The per capita income for the city was $19,174. None of the families and 5.0% of the population were living below the poverty line, including no under eighteen and 13.0% of those over 64.

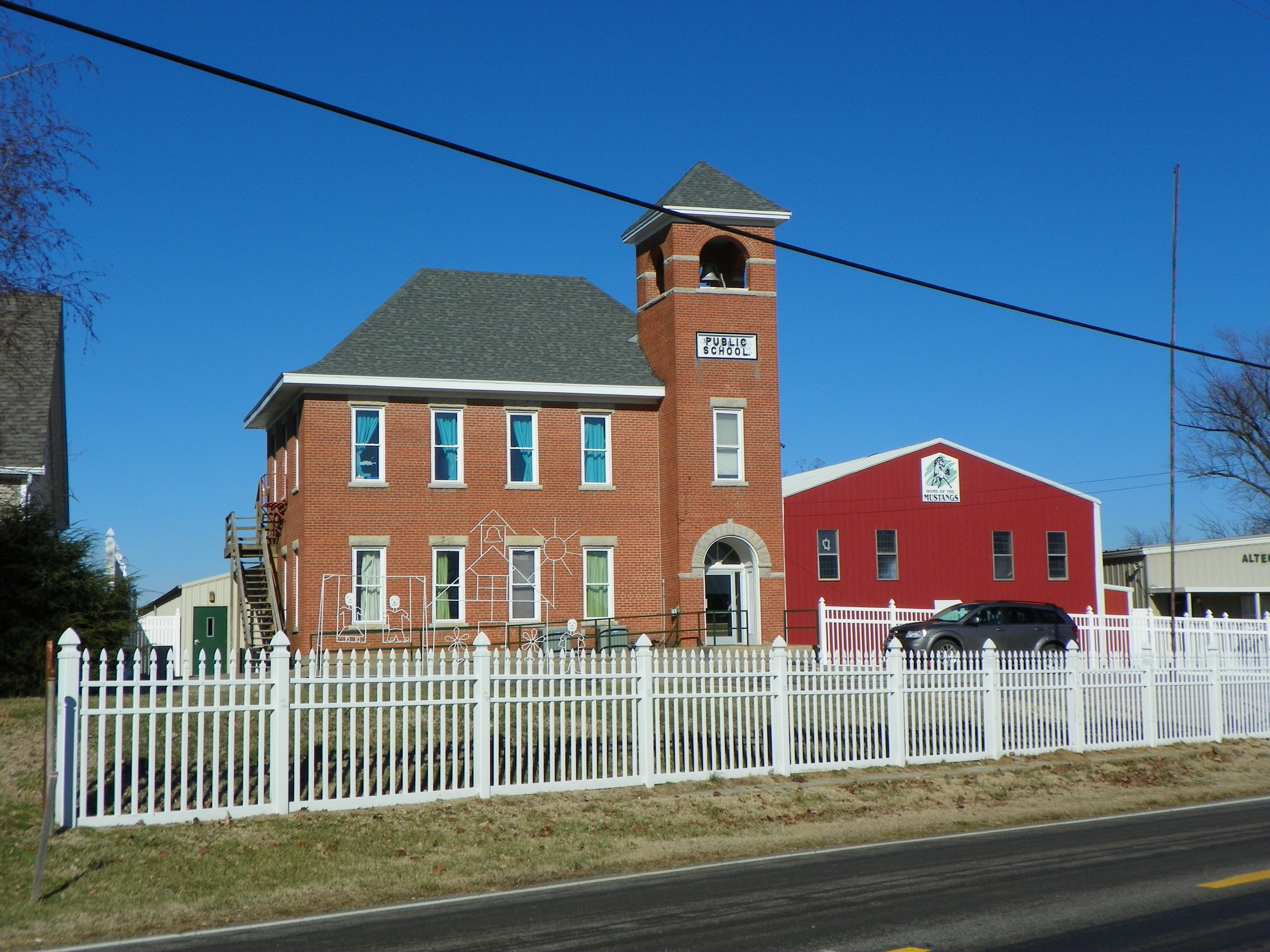
Public School District 48

== Education ==
Altenburg Public School District #48 operates one public elementary school, Altenburg Elementary School.

Altenburg has a public library, a branch of the Riverside Regional Library.

== Arts and culture ==
The East Perry Community Fair is held annually on the fair grounds each September.

== Nearby communities ==
Nearby communities
