= Sion =

Sion may refer to:

- an alternative spelling of Zion

== People ==
- Sion (name) or Siôn, a Welsh and other given name and surname, including a list of people and fictional characters with the name
- Shion or Sion, a Japanese given name

== Places ==
=== France ===
- Sion, Gers, France
- Sion, Saxon-Sion, Meurthe-et-Moselle department, France
- Sion-les-Mines, Loire-Atlantique department, France
- Sion-sur-l'Océan, Vendee department, France
- Mont Sion, namesake of the Priory of Sion

=== India ===
- Sion, Mumbai, India
  - Sion Causeway
  - Sion Creek
  - Sion Hillock Fort
  - Sion railway station (India)

=== Switzerland ===
- Sion, Switzerland
  - Sion District
  - Sion Airport
  - Sion railway station (Switzerland)
  - Roman Catholic Diocese of Sion
  - Sion Cathedral

=== Elsewhere ===
- Sion (Asia Minor), a former ancient city and bishopric, and present Latin Catholic titular see in Asian Turkey
- Sion, Alberta, Canada
- Sion Castle, Czech Republic
- Sion, Netherlands

== Other uses ==
- Sion (periodical), official organ of the Armenian Patriarchate of Jerusalem
- Sion, a 1987 novel by Vojislav V. Jovanović
- Sion College, a former college, guild of parochial clergy and almshouse in London
- Sono Motors Sion, an electric car
- FC Sion, a Swiss football team
- Sion, an independent heavy metal band founded by Howard Jones and Jared Dines.

== See also ==
- Mount Sion (disambiguation)
- Sion Hill (disambiguation)
- Sion railway station (disambiguation)
- Scion (disambiguation)
- Sioni (disambiguation)
- Sione
- Syon (disambiguation)
- Xion (disambiguation)
- Zion (disambiguation)
- Benei Sión, also known as Sabatarios and Cabañistas in Chile, are an ethno-religious group
- Sion's minimax theorem in mathematics
