= Zionism (disambiguation) =

Zionism is the movement that supported the creation of a Jewish homeland.

Zionism or Zionists may also refer to:

== Unrelated to the movement that supported the creation of a Jewish homeland ==
- Christ Community Church in Zion, Illinois, U.S., members of which are sometimes called Zionites
- African Zionism, a religious movement in southern Africa, inspired by the Illinois-based movement
  - Zionist churches, a group of Christian denominations that derive from the Christian Catholic Apostolic Church
    - Zion Christian Church, main Zionist movement in South Africa
- Zionites (Germany), an 18th century sect

== Related to the movement that supported the creation of a Jewish homeland ==
- Christian Zionism
- Cultural Zionism
- Federal Zionism
- General Zionism
- Green Zionism
- Labor Zionism
- Liberal Zionism
- Nietzschean Zionism
- Reform Zionism
- Religious Zionism
- Revisionist Zionism
- Secular Zionism

== See also ==
- Anti-Zionism
- Neo-Zionism
- Non-Zionism
- Post-Zionism
- Proto-Zionism
- Zion (disambiguation)
- Zionist Occupation Government conspiracy theory
