= Zion (disambiguation) =

Zion is a placename in the Hebrew Bible used as a synonym for Jerusalem, and for the Land of Israel.

Zion may also refer to:

== Religion ==
- Zion (Latter Day Saints), used to connote an association of the righteous
- Zion (Rastafari), an ideal to which Rastafarians aspire
- Zion Christian Church, an African initiated church in Southern Africa
- Zion Bible College, now Northpoint Bible College, in Haverhill, Massachusetts, U.S.
- Zion College, in Chattanooga, Tennessee, U.S.
- Zion Church (disambiguation)

== Arts, entertainment and media ==
=== Music ===
- Zion, half of Zion & Lennox, a Puerto Rican reggaeton duo
- Zion I, an American hip-hop group
- Zion (Hillsong United album), 2013
- Zion (Phil Keaggy album), 2000
- Zion, a 2014 album by Savant (musician)
- Zion (song), a 1973 demo by David Bowie
- "Zion", a 1999 composition for orchestra by Dan Welcher
- "Zion", a 1963 song by Laurel Aitken
- "Slap It", a 2001 song by Fluke, featured on the soundtrack for The Matrix Reloaded as "Zion"

=== Other uses in arts, entertainment and media ===
- Zion (The Matrix), a fictional city in the Matrix series
- Zion, a fictional space station in the novel Neuromancer
- Zion, a character in 2009 French-Israeli drama film Zion and His Brother
- Zion Miller, a character in the Netflix series Ginny & Georgia
- Zion Warden, a supporting character in the web series New Easton Sim Saturday Night
- Zion Kujou, a character in the manga series Tough
- Zion Thenardier, a minor antagonist in the light novel series Madan no Ou to Vanadis
- Zion (film), a 2018 short documentary
- Zion (journal), a former academic journal

== Places ==
=== Canada ===
- Zion, Northumberland County, Ontario
- Zion, Peterborough County, Ontario

=== Jerusalem ===
- Mount Zion, a hill in Jerusalem

=== United States ===
- Zion, Alabama
- Zion, Arkansas
- Zion, Illinois
  - Zion station
  - Zion Township, Lake County, Illinois
- Zion, Maryland
- Zion Township, Stearns County, Minnesota
- Zion, Missouri
- Zion, New Jersey
- Zion, Oklahoma
- Zion, Pennsylvania
- Zion, South Carolina
- Zion Crossroads, Virginia
- Zion, West Virginia
- Zion, Wisconsin
- Zion National Park, in Utah
  - Zion Canyon

=== Elsewhere ===
- Zion, Saint Kitts and Nevis
- Zion, the German name for a village in Prussia that is now called Wilenko, Poland

== Other uses ==
- Zion Wildlife Gardens, now Kamo Wildlife Sanctuary in New Zealand
- Zion (name), people with the given and surname of Zion

== See also ==
- Mount Zion (disambiguation)
- Scion (disambiguation)
- Sion (disambiguation)
- Sioni (disambiguation)
- Syon (disambiguation)
- Xion (disambiguation)
- Zion Hill (disambiguation)
- Zionism, the Jewish nationalist movement
- Zionism (disambiguation)
- Zionites (Germany), an 18th-century religious sect in Germany
- Zeon (disambiguation)
