= Mobile Suit Gundam: Crossfire =

2006 video game

- Developer: BEC
- Publisher: Namco Bandai Games (Note: Released under the Bandai banner outside of North America.)
- Composer: Takanori Arima
- Platform: PlayStation 3
- Release: JP: November 11, 2006; NA: November 17, 2006; EU: March 23, 2007
- Genres: Action, mecha
- Modes: Single-player, multiplayer

Mobile Suit Gundam: Crossfire, known in Japan and Europe as Mobile Suit Gundam: Target in Sight (機動戦士ガンダム Target in Sight, Kidō Senshi Gandamu Target in Sight), is a PlayStation 3 launch title, published and developed by Namco Bandai Games, based on Sunrise's Mobile Suit Gundam franchise. It was released in Japan on November 11, 2006, and in North America on November 17, 2006, and in Europe on March 23, 2007.

== Plot ==
A Zeon MS-14 Gelgoog engages an Earth Federation RX-79[G] Gundam Ground Type mobile suit.

Mobile Suit Gundam: Crossfire Takes place during the One Year War, UC 0079, with all missions being based in the eastern half of the world from Africa to Australia after the Federations GM production increase in October.

== Reception ==
Reception

Aggregate scores
Aggregator	Score
GameRankings	35%
Metacritic	33/100

Review scores
Publication	Score
Famitsu	32/40
Game Informer	3.75/10
GamePro	1/5
GameSpot	3.9/10
IGN	3.2/10
Official U.S. PlayStation Magazine	3/10
PlayStation: The Official Magazine	5/10
X-Play	1/5

The game has received generally poor critical reception.

Japanese video game magazine Famitsu was the first to review this game, giving it a 32 out of 40 with each panelist rating it an 8 out of 10.

On the day of the PlayStation 3 launch in Japan, Crossfire sold 33,000 units. The American release was not nearly as well received as the Japanese release. IGN gave the game a 3.2 out of 10, GameSpot rated it 3.9 out of 10, 1UP gave it a score of 2 out of 10, and Game Informer gave the game a 3.75 out of 10. OPM gave Crossfire a 3 out of 10. MAHQ, a dedicated mecha anime website, gave it 1.5 out of 5. PSM gave the game a 5 out of 10. GamePro gave it a 1.0 out of 5.0. X-Play gave it a 1 out of 5 for "being shovelware of the highest order". Problems cited by reviewers included bland, outdated graphics, an underdeveloped story, bad voice acting, clumsy gameplay, and a slew of technical issues including (but not limited to) constant framerate issues, collision bugs, and frequent malfunctions of allied and even enemy AI.
