= Shion =

- Pronunciation: /ɕi.on/
- Gender: Both

Origin
- Origin: Japanese
- Region of origin: Japanese

Shion is a Japanese given name, and may refer to:

== Sportspeople ==
- Shion Homma (本間 至恩; born 2000), Japanese footballer
- Shion Inoue (井上 潮音; born 1997), Japanese footballer
- Shion Kokubun (國分 紫苑; born 1991), Japanese figure skater
- Shion Niwa (丹羽 詩温; born 1994), Japanese footballer

== Musicians ==
- Shion (singer) (詩音), R&B singer
- Shion Miyawaki (宮脇 詩音; born 1990), J-pop singer
- Shion Tsuji (辻 詩音; born 1990), singer-songwriter
- Shion Tsurubo (鶴房 汐恩, born 2000), Japanese idol, member of JO1

== Other people ==
- Sion Sono (園 子温; born 1951), Japanese filmmaker
- Shion Takeuchi (born 1988), American television writer and creator of the Netflix series Inside Job
- Shion Utsunomiya (宇都宮しをん; born 1994), Japanese adult video actress
- Shion Wakayama (若山詩音; born 1998), Japanese voice actress
- Shion Yumi (夕美しおん), Japanese adult video actress

== Fictional characters ==
- Aries Shion, a character from the manga and anime Saint Seiya
- Murasaki Shion (紫咲シオン), a virtual YouTuber
- Shion (紫苑), one of the two main characters of the novel, manga, and anime No. 6
- Shion, a hidden scenario character from the yaoi visual novel Enzai
- Shion (Naruto), a character in Naruto Shippūden the Movie
- Shion (紫苑), a sub-boss in The King of Fighters XI video game
- Shion (Overwatch), an omnic playable character in the Overwatch franchise
- Shion (Wonder Boy), a Legendary Hero from the Genesis game Wonder Boy in Monster World
- Shion, a character in the Webtoon Dark Moon: The Blood Altar
- Shion, a character in the manga series Hell's Paradise: Jigokuraku
- Shion, a name given to a character from The Hundred Line: Last Defense Academy
- Shion Ashimori (芦森 詩音), a character in the anime series Sing a Bit of Harmony
- Shion Hoshino (星野 汐音), a character in the manga series World's End Harem
- Shion Izumi (和泉 紫音), a character in the manga series Gantz
- Shion Kaida (甲斐田 紫音), a character in the drama cd, anime Paradox Live
- Shion Kaminari (神成 シオン), a character in the light novel series VTuber Legend
- Shion Karanomori (唐之杜 志恩), a character from the anime series Psycho Pass
- Shion Kiba (綺場 シオン), a character in the anime Cardfight!! Vanguard G
- Shion Kozakura (小桜 紫苑), a character from the Kagerou Project
- Shion Kyozuka (京塚 志温), a character in the manga series Slow Start
- Shion Pavlichenko, character in the anime Darker than Black
- Shion Sasaki (佐々木 翔音), a character in the Love Live! Bluebird
- Shion Shiunji (紫雲寺 志苑), a character in the manga series The Shiunji Family Children
- Shion Sonozaki (園崎 詩音), a character from the Higurashi no Naku Koro ni visual novel, anime and manga
- Shion Uzuki (シオン ウヅキ), the female protagonist from the Xenosaga video game series
- Shion Yasuoka (安岡 紫音), the female protagonist of the manga and anime Shion no Ō
- Shion Yorigami (依神紫苑), a character in Antimony of Common Flowers from the Touhou Project series
- Shion Yozakura (夜桜 四怨), a character in the manga series Mission: Yozakura Family
- Sion Eltnam Atlasia (シオン エルトナム アトラシア), one of the main characters from the Melty Blood graphic novel, video games, and manga

== Other uses ==
- Shion (album) (志恩), album by MUCC
- The Japanese pronunciation of Zion

== See also ==
- Xion (disambiguation), which is pronounced Shion
- Sion (disambiguation)
- Zion (disambiguation)
