= Zion (name) =

- Gender: Male
- Language: Old English, Hebrew, Greek

Other names
- Related names: Sion

Zion is a given name and surname derived from the ancient Canaanite hill fortress in Jerusalem called the City of David. It is less commonly spelled Sion, Tzion, Tsion, Tsiyon, Seyon, or Tsiyyon. In Hebrew Zion is one of the 70 Names of Jerusalem. It is of Old English, Hebrew, and Akkadian (Assyrian-Babylonian) origins.

== Notable people with the given name "Zion" include ==
- Zion Childress (born 2002), American football player
- Zion Clark (born 1997), American wrestler
- Zion Cohen (born 1983), Israeli footballer
- Zion Digmi (born 1942), Israeli footballer
- Zion Evrony, Israeli diplomat
- Zyon Gilbert (born 1999), American football player
- Zion Golan (born 1955), Israeli singer
- Zion Harmon (born 2002), American basketball player
- Zion Hwang (born 1997/1998), South Korean-Colombian singer-songwriter
- Zion Johnson (born 1999), American football player
- Zion Levy (1925–2008), Israeli rabbi
- Zion Lights (born 1984), British-Indian activist
- Zion Logue (born 2001), American football player
- Zyon McCollum (born 1999), American football player
- Zion McKinney (born 1958), American football player
- Zion Merili (born 1957), Israeli footballer
- Zión Moreno (born 1995), American actress
- Zion Nelson (born 2001), American football player
- Zion Nybeck (born 2002), Swedish ice hockey player
- Zion Pinyan (born 1951), Israeli politician
- Zion Redington (born 2006), American wheelchair rugby player
- Zion Suzuki (born 2002), Japanese footballer
- Zion Tracy (born 2004), American football player
- Zion Tse, American professor
- Zion Tupuola-Fetui (born 2000), American football player
- Zion Tzemah (born 1990), Israeli footballer
- Zion Williamson (born 2000), American basketball player
- Zion Wright (born 1999), American skateboarder
- Zion Young (born 2004), American football player

=== Alternative spellings as given name ===
- Tsiyon Abebe (born 2006), Ethiopian middle- and long-distance runner
- Tsion Avital, Israeli philosopher of art and culture
- Tsion Ben-Judah, a character in Left Behind
- Zyon Braun (born 1994), German politician
- Zyon Cavalera
- Zyon Gilbert
- Zyon Maiu'u
- Zyon McCollum
- Zyon Pullin

== Notable people with the surname "Zion" include ==
- Daniel Zion (1883–1979), Turkish-Israeli rabbi
- Gene Zion (1913–1975), American author
- Jonathan Zion (ice hockey) (born 1981), Canadian ice hockey player
- Naor Zion (born 1973), Israeli comedian
- Nomika Zion, Israeli peace activist
- Roger H. Zion (1921–2019), American politician and lawyer from Indiana
- Sidney Zion (1933–2009), American writer
- William Zion (1872–1919), American soldier
- Odessa A'zion (born 2000), American actress

=== Alternative spellings as surname ===
- Amda Seyon I, Emperor of Ethiopia from 1314 to 1344
- Sergey Tsion (1874–1947), Russian revolutionary

== See also ==
- Zion (disambiguation), a disambiguation page for Zion
