= Zeon =

Zeon may refer to:

- Zeon (liturgy), part of the Mass in the Rite of Constantinople
- Zeon, a fictional nation of space colonies in the anime series Mobile Suit Gundam
- Zeon, a character from Xenoblade Chronicles 3

== See also ==
- Xeon, a brand of Intel microprocessors
- Zion (disambiguation)
