= Soudan, Loire-Atlantique =

Soudan
- Commune
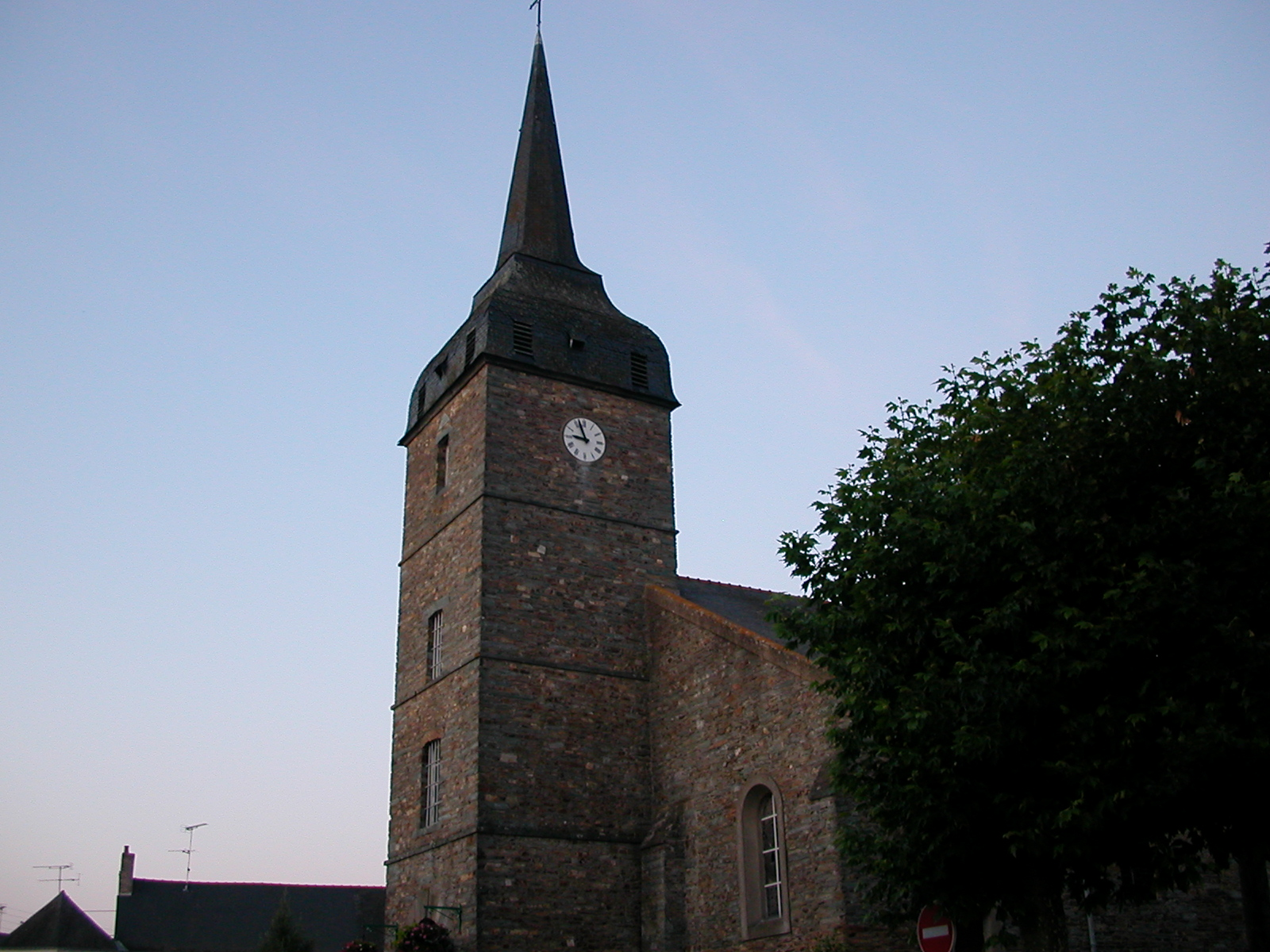
- The church in Soudan

- Coat of arms
- Location of Soudan
- Location within France Location within Pays de la Loire
- Coordinates: 47°44′18″N 1°18′13″W
- Country: France
- Region: Pays de la Loire
- Department: Loire-Atlantique
- Arrondissement: Châteaubriant-Ancenis
- Canton: Châteaubriant
- Intercommunality: Châteaubriant-Derval

Government
  - Mayor (2020–2026): Jean-Claude Desgués
- Area^{1}: 53.82 km^{2} (20.78 sq mi)
- Highest elevation: 111 m (364 ft)
- Lowest elevation: 57 m (187 ft)
- Population (2023): 1,959
  - Density: 36.40/km^{2} (94.27/sq mi)
- Demonym(s): Soudanaises, Soudanais
- Time zone: UTC+01:00 (CET)
  - Summer (DST): UTC+02:00 (CEST)
- INSEE/Postal code: 44199 /44110
- Website: www.communedesoudan44110.fr
- ^{1} French Land Register data, which excludes lakes, ponds, glaciers > 1 km^{2} (0.386 sq mi or 247 acres) and river estuaries.

Soudan (French pronunciation: [sudɑ̃]; Breton: Saoudan) is a commune in the Loire-Atlantique department in western France.

The river Verzée rises in the north-western part of the commune, then flows eastward through its northern part; the river Chère rises in the southern part of the commune, then flows northwestward through its western part.

== See also ==
- Communes of the Loire-Atlantique department
