= Syon =

Syon can mean:

- an alternative spelling of Zion
- Syon, Isleworth, London, England
  - Syon Abbey, or simply Syon, a 15th–16th century monastery
  - Syon House
  - Syon Park

== See also ==
- Syon Lane (disambiguation)
- Syon Lane railway station
- Scion (disambiguation)
- Zion (disambiguation)
- Songs of Syon, a 1904 collection of hymns and sacred poems
