= Mouais =

- Commune
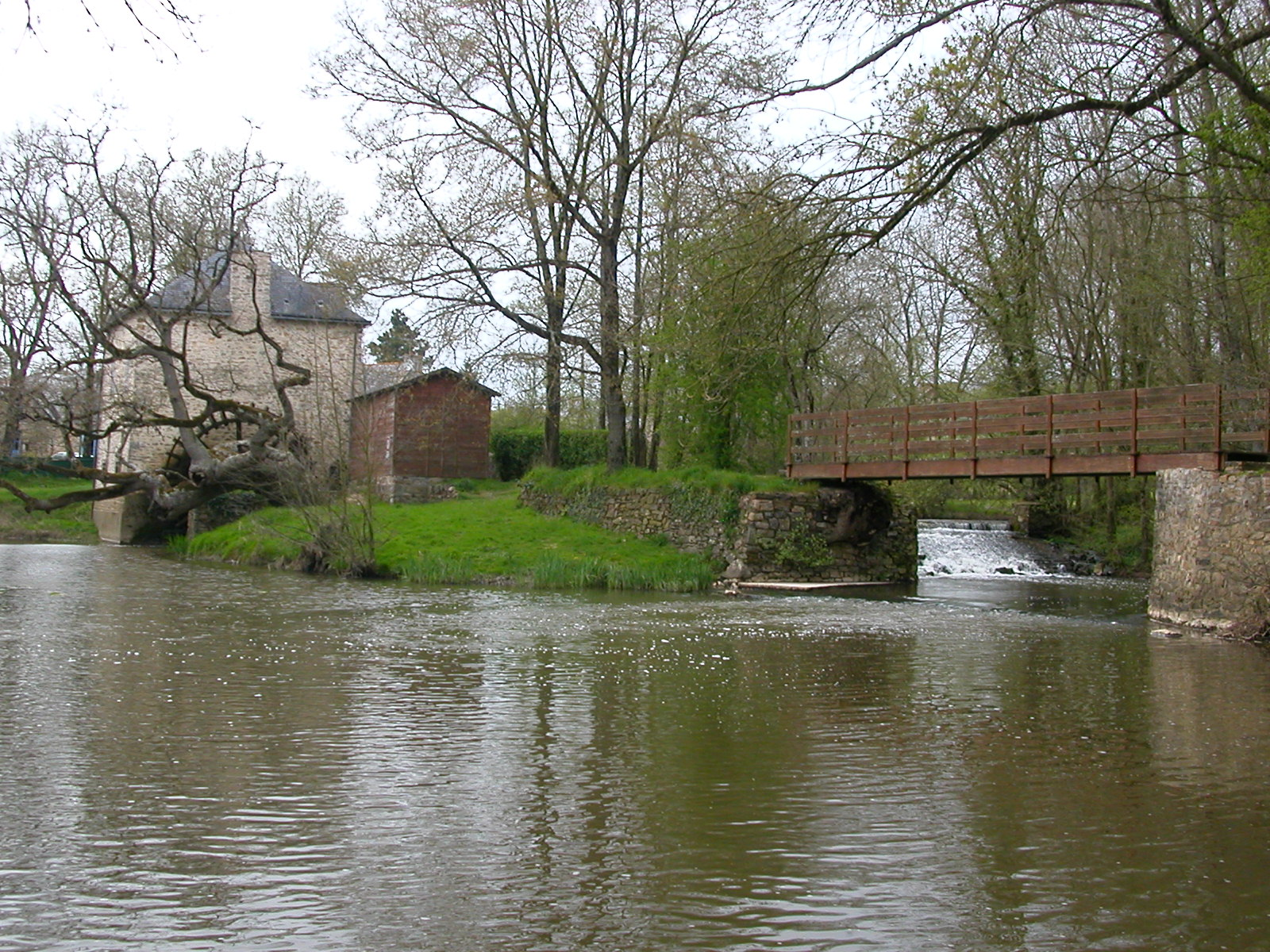
- Old mill adjacent to the Chère

- Coat of arms
- Location of Mouais
- Location within France Location within Pays de la Loire
- Coordinates: 47°41′47″N 1°38′36″W
- Country: France
- Region: Pays de la Loire
- Department: Loire-Atlantique
- Arrondissement: Châteaubriant-Ancenis
- Canton: Guémené-Penfao
- Intercommunality: Châteaubriant-Derval

Government
  - Mayor (2020–2026): Yvan Menager
- Area^{1}: 9.93 km^{2} (3.83 sq mi)
- Highest elevation: 61 m (200 ft)
- Lowest elevation: 9 m (30 ft)
- Population (2023): 352
  - Density: 35.4/km^{2} (91.8/sq mi)
- Time zone: UTC+01:00 (CET)
  - Summer (DST): UTC+02:00 (CEST)
- INSEE/Postal code: 44105 /44590
- ^{1} French Land Register data, which excludes lakes, ponds, glaciers > 1 km^{2} (0.386 sq mi or 247 acres) and river estuaries.

Mouais (French pronunciation: [mwɛ]; Gallo: Móaè, pronounced [mwə]; Breton: Lanvoe) is a commune in the Loire-Atlantique department in western France.

== History ==
It is possible that the toponym comes from the hagionym Moë, an obscure Breton saint.

== Geography ==
The town is located on the northern edge of the department, on the right bank of the river Chère, which forms most of its southern border.

== Population ==
Historical population
Year	Pop.	±% p.a.
1968	356	—
1975	331	−1.03%
1982	302	−1.30%
1990	280	−0.94%
1999	259	−0.86%
2007	331	+3.11%
2012	394	+3.55%
2017	385	−0.46%
2023	352	−1.48%
Source: INSEE

== Personalities ==
- Jean Fréour, sculptor

== See also ==
- Communes of the Loire-Atlantique department
