= Sion railway station =

Sion railway station could refer to:

- Sion railway station (India) in Sion, Mumbai, India
- Sion railway station (Switzerland) in Sion, Valais, Switzerland

== See also ==
- Sion (disambiguation)
- Sion Mills railway station, Northern Ireland
