= Ronsdorf =

Coordinates: 51°14′N 7°12′E

Ronsdorf is a district of the German city of Wuppertal. It has a population of about 22,500. Ronsdorf was first mentioned in 1494, and in 1745 it received its town charter. It was founded a few years earlier by Elias Eller when he relocated the Zionites there from Elberfeld. Ronsdorf was made a part of Wuppertal in 1929.

In addition to the town, Ronsdorf consists of the villages of Heidt, Erbschlö, Holthausen, Blombach, Linde, Marscheid, Großsporkert, Kleinsporkert and Kleinbeek.

As with other districts of Wuppertal, Ronsdorf was heavily damaged during the allied bombings of World War II on May 29, 1943. Only a few old buildings (like the typical black and white timber-framed "Bergisches Haus") remain.

== Sights ==
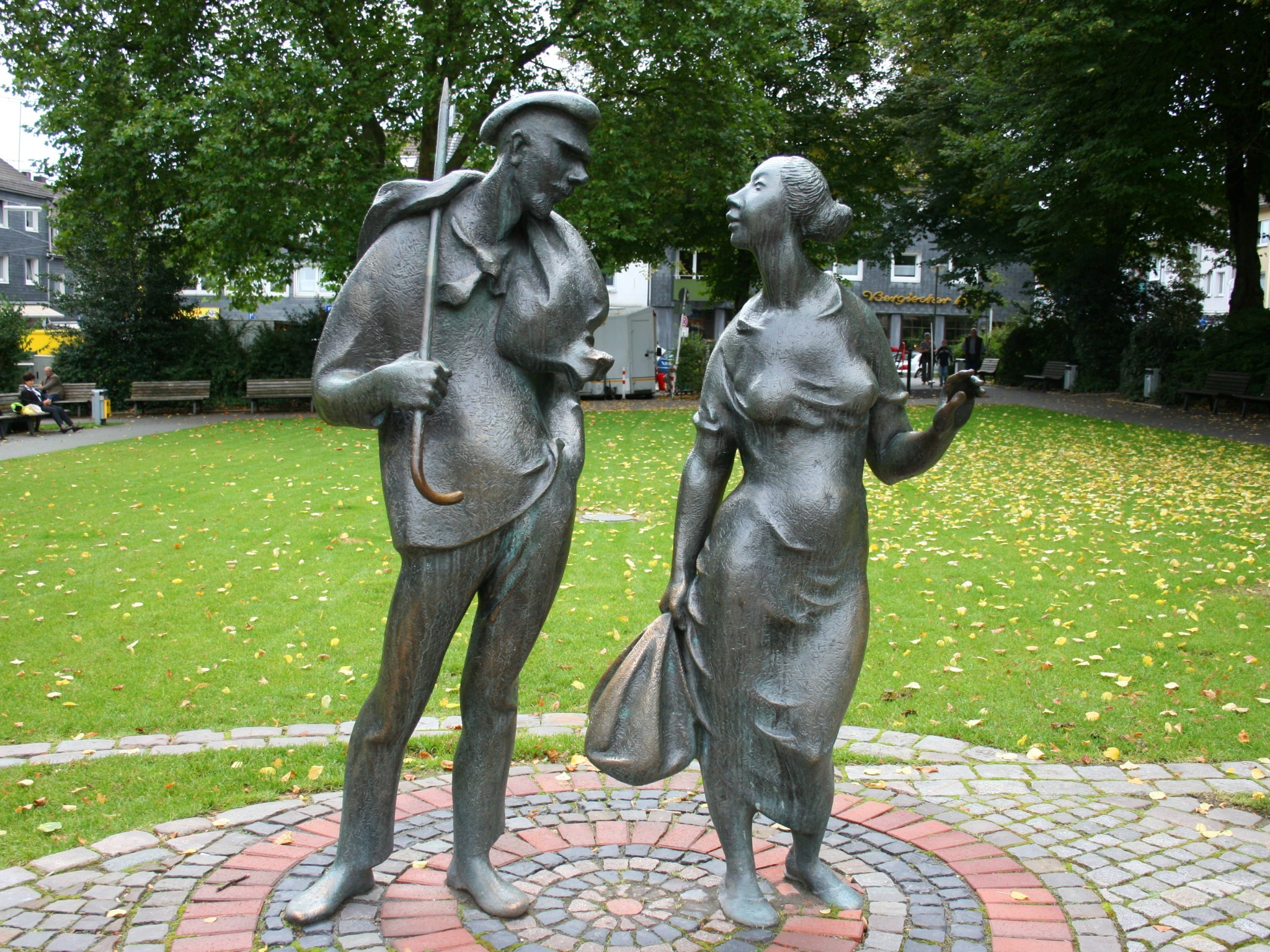
Ribbon makers memorial

- Water supply dam (Ronsdorfer Talsperre)
- Ribbon makers memorial (Bandwirker-Denkmal) (ribbon making has always been one of the major businesses in Ronsdorf)
- Museum of Ribbon Making (Bandwirkermuseum)
- Lutheran church, built in 1793, making it the oldest church in Ronsdorf
- Reformed church, built in 1858
- Catholic church, a modern concrete building

== Regular events ==
The "Liefersack" is a bi-annual festival held in odd-numbered years, organised by local clubs and businesses. The main purpose is to collect money for charity.

In even-numbered years, the "Ronsdorfer Bürgerfest" takes place, which has the character of a fair.

== Notables ==
Rudolf Carnap was born in Ronsdorf.
