= Syon Lane =

Syon Lane refers to:

- Syon Lane, a road in west London crossing Gillette Corner, both sometimes toponyms, names for the immediate surrounds (neighbourhood). Formerly: Syon Hill.
  - Syon Lane railway station

These are in a part of Isleworth yet heavily associated with its Osterley daughter district/large neighbourhood and the station serves parts of New Brentford. All these places are in the London Borough of Hounslow.

== See also ==
- Syon (disambiguation)
