= Xion =

Xion may refer to:

- Xion (Bloody Roar), a character in the video game series
- Xion (Kingdom Hearts), a character in the Organization XIII group
- Xi baryon, a particle containing one or more massive quark(s)

== See also ==
- Shion (name)
- Sion (disambiguation)
- Zion (disambiguation)
