= Sion Hill (disambiguation) =

Sion Hill is a historic landmark in Havre de Grace, Maryland, U.S.

Sion Hill may refer to:

- Sion Hill, U.S. Virgin Islands
- Sion Hill, Blackrock, Dublin, Ireland
  - Dominican College Sion Hill, or Sion Hill, a school
  - St Catherine's College of Education for Home Economics, or Sion Hill, a former teacher training college
- Sion Hill FC, a football club in the Sion Hill neighborhood of Arnos Vale, Saint Vincent and the Grenadines

== See also ==
- Mount Sion (disambiguation)
- Sion Hill Hall, Kirby Wiske, North Yorkshire, England
- Sion Hill Place, Bath, a building in Somerset, UK
