= Sioni =

Sioni may refer to:

- Sioni (townlet), a townlet in Mtskheta-Mtianeti region, Georgia
- Sioni people

== See also ==
- Sion (disambiguation)
- Zion
