= Sion Creek =

Creek in Mumbai, India

Sion Creek is a creek in central Mumbai near Sion. The creek divides the city from the suburbs. It empties out into the Thane Creek to the east. It also has the Sion Fort and the Sion tank.

A lot of encroachments have taken place and the newspaper, The Times of India has exposed them with a series of articles in 2021.
