= Scion =

Scion may refer to:

== Arts, entertainment, and media ==
=== Characters ===
- Atlantean Scion, a device in the Tomb Raider video game series
- Scion, a parahuman in the web serial Worm (2011-2013)
- Scion, a playable class in the game Path of Exile (2013)
- Scions, an alien race in the video game Battlezone 2 (1999)
- Scions, an alien race in James Goss's Torchwood novel First Born (2011)

=== Other uses in arts, entertainment, and media ===
- "Scion", an episode from season 10 of the TV series Smallville
- Scion (comics), a comic book (2000–2004)
- Scion (role-playing game)
- Scion Audio/Visual, a record label of the Scion automobile marque
- Scion Rock Fest, an annual heavy metal music festival (2009–2014)
- Scion (novel), a 2026 cyberpunk novel by James Islington

== Brands ==
- Scion (automobile), a former Toyota brand in North America
- Scion Hotels, a brand once proposed by The Trump Organization
- Short Scion, 1930s monoplanes

== Other uses ==
- Scion (grafting), in horticulture, the upper part of a combined plant
- Scion (organisation), a forest research organisation in New Zealand
- SCION (Internet architecture), a network routing protocol project

== See also ==
- Heir
- Psion (disambiguation)
- Sion (disambiguation)
- Zion (disambiguation)
