= Zeon (liturgy) =

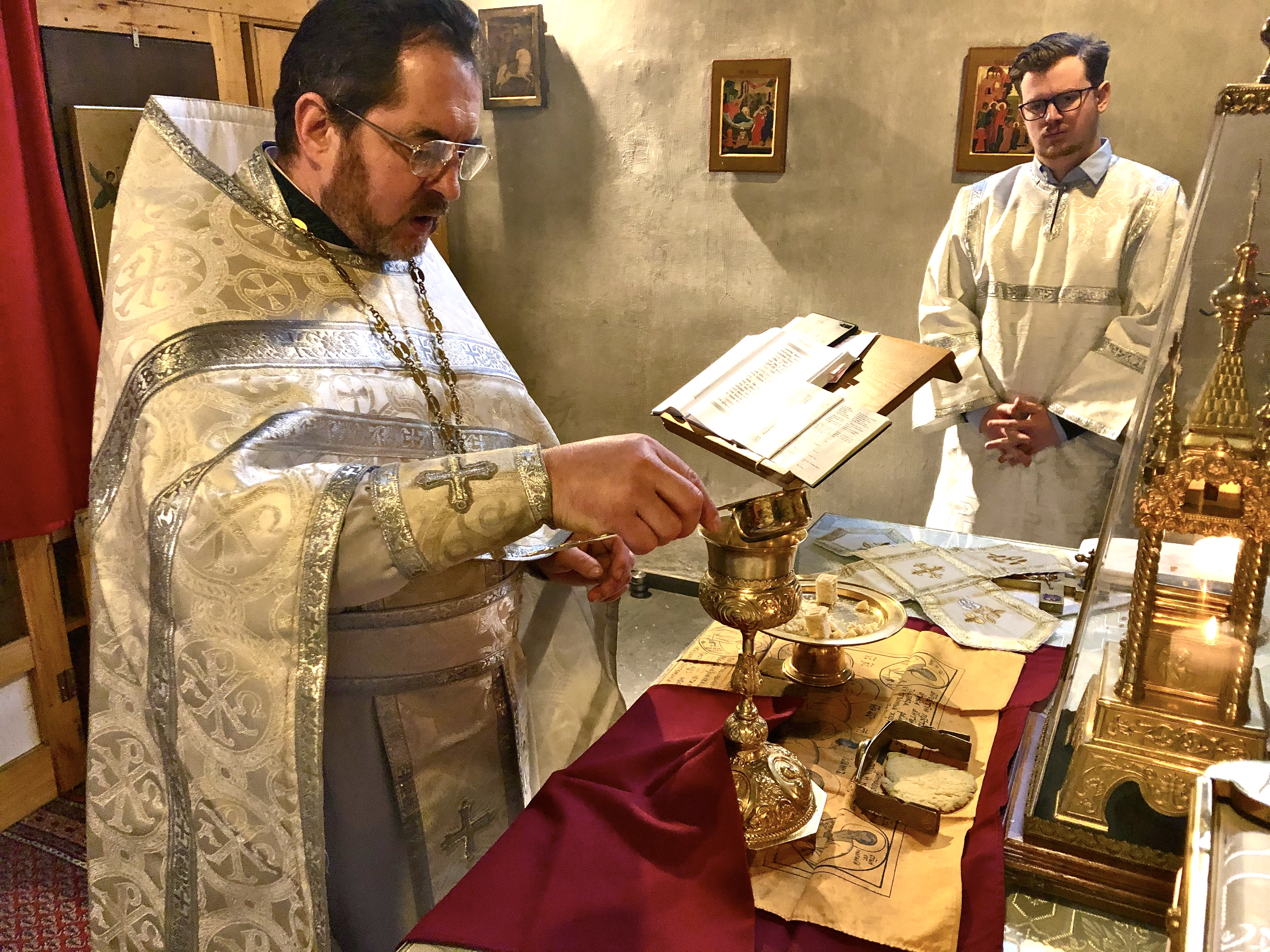
Zeon during the Divine Liturgy at a Russian Orthodox church, Cologne

Zeon (Greek: ζέον "boiling", "fervor") is a liturgical action which takes place in the Divine Liturgy of the Rite of Constantinople, during which hot water is added to the chalice.

== Origins ==
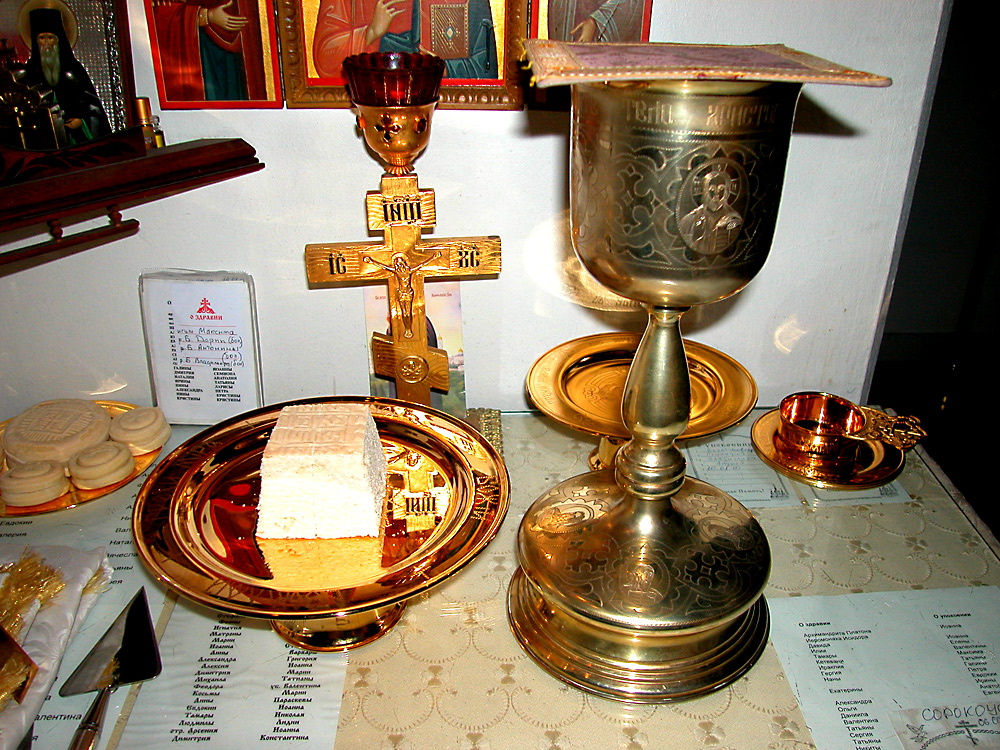
The diskos (paten) and chalice set on the Altar of Prothesis. To the far right, against the wall, is the zeon cup and tray.

The historical beginnings of the ritual are unknown; however, it is clearly of ancient origin. The practice of drinking wine mixed with water existed already in Ancient Greece. Drinking wine unmixed was uncommon, and was signaled as such. The Sephardi Hebrews had the practice of meziga (mixing) the Kiddush wine with water. The Christian Orthodox and Sephardic customs may share the same Oriental origin.

== Description ==
Immediately following the fraction, the altar server hands the deacon a vessel of hot water. The deacon presents it to the priest and says, "Bless, Master, the hot water." The priest blesses it with his right hand saying, "Blessed is the fervor of Thy saints, always, now and ever, and unto the ages of ages. Amen." The deacon pours a portion of the hot water into the chalice, making the Sign of the Cross with the water, as he says, "The fervor of faith, full of the Holy Spirit." Symbolically, the warm water represents the water which flowed from the side of Jesus at the time of the Crucifixion; and also the Christian belief that the Body of Christ is life-giving. Orthodox Christians believe that they partake of the Resurrected Body and Blood of Christ, and the warmth of the chalice is a reminder of that doctrine.

== Vessel ==
The same term is used as a noun to describe the vessel used for this purpose. The type of vessel used differs depending upon whether the Greek or Slavic Rite is used. In the Greek practice, the zeon vessel tends to be shaped like a very small ewer set on a tiny plate. The Slavic practice, by contrast, uses a larger vessel shaped like a cup with a flat handle, set on a somewhat larger plate. Both traditions use enough to heat the entire chalice.
