= Chère =

River in France

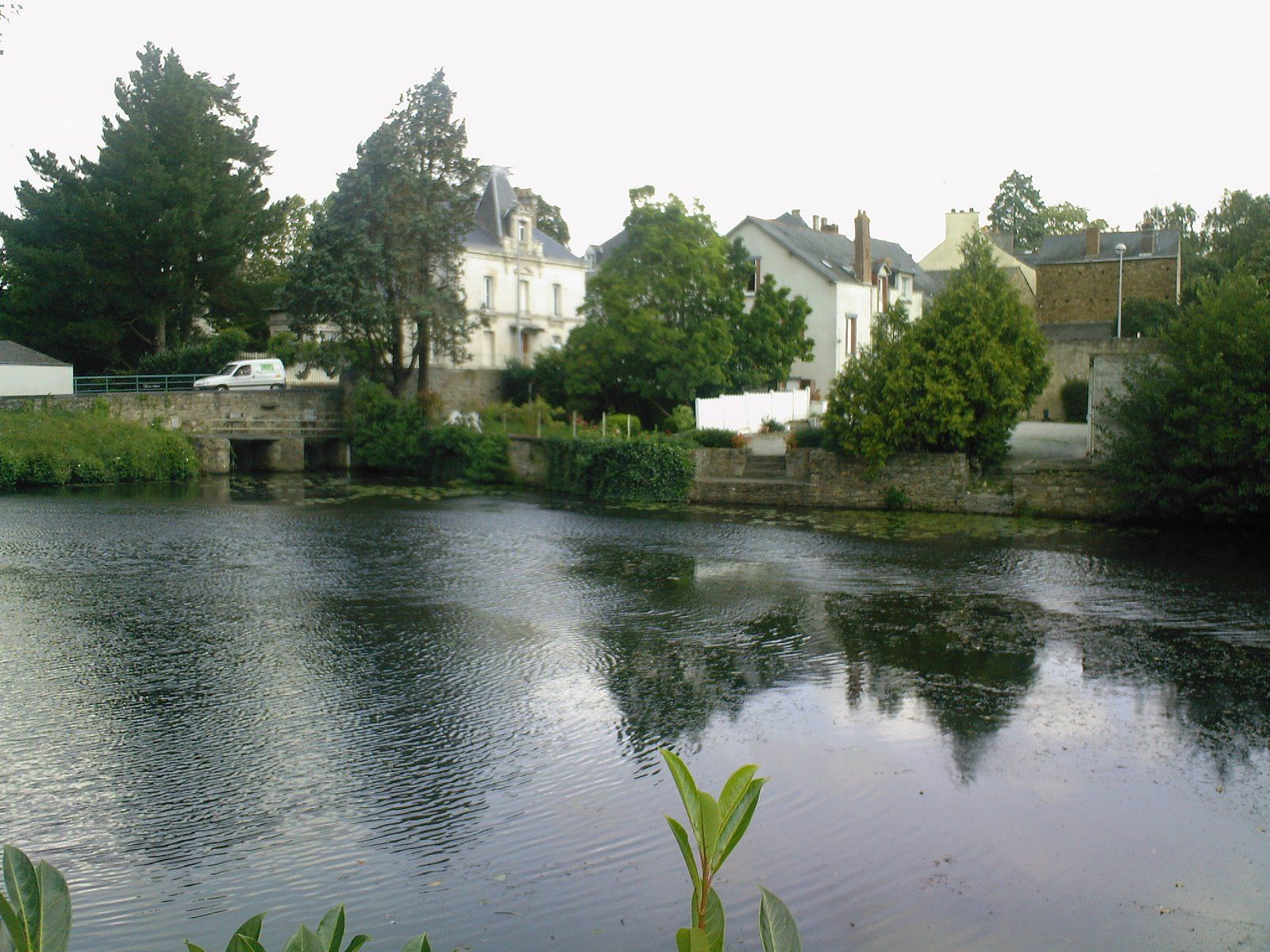
- The Chère at Châteaubriant

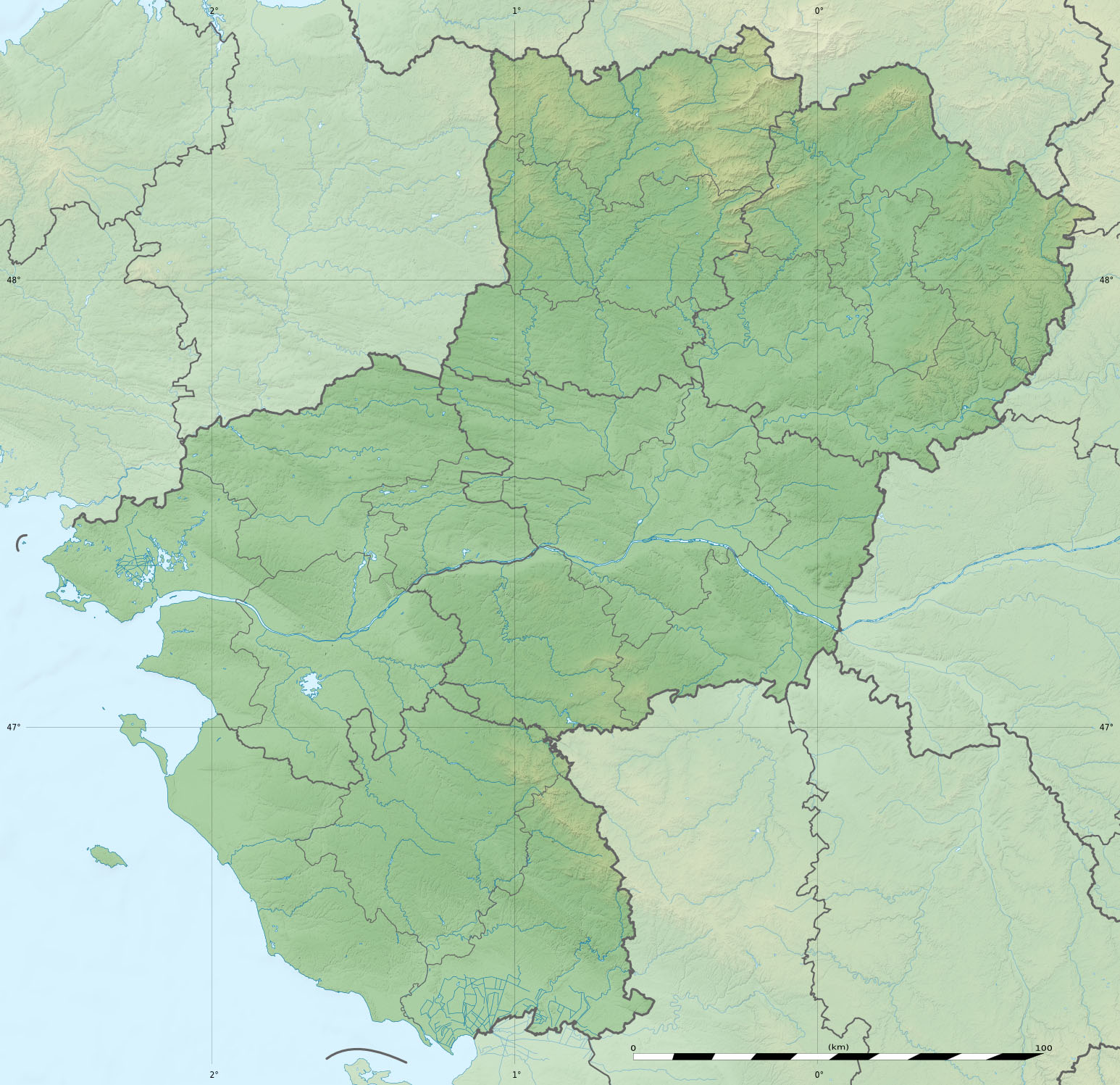
- Location within France Location within Pays de la Loire

Location
- Country: France

Physical characteristics
- Source
  - location: Soudan
  - coordinates: 47°42′01″N 01°17′25″W
  - elevation: 80 m (260 ft)
- Mouth
  - location: Vilaine
  - coordinates: 47°42′25″N 01°50′13″W
  - elevation: 3 m (9.8 ft)
- Length: 65.1 km (40.5 mi)
- Basin size: 390 km^{2} (150 sq mi)
- Discharge
  - average: 2.4 m^{3}/s (85 cu ft/s)

Basin features
- Progression: Vilaine→ Atlantic Ocean

The Chère (French pronunciation: [ʃɛʁ]; Breton: Kaer) is a 65.1 km (40.5 mi) long river in the Loire-Atlantique and Ille-et-Vilaine départements, northwestern France. Its source is at Soudan. It flows generally west. It is a left tributary of the Vilaine into which it flows between Pierric and Sainte-Anne-sur-Vilaine.

== Communes along its course ==
This list is ordered from source to mouth:

- Loire-Atlantique: Soudan, Châteaubriant, Rougé, Saint-Aubin-des-Châteaux, Sion-les-Mines, Mouais, Derval,
- Ille-et-Vilaine: Grand-Fougeray,
- Loire-Atlantique: Pierric,
- Ille-et-Vilaine: Sainte-Anne-sur-Vilaine
