= Sion-les-Mines =

- Commune
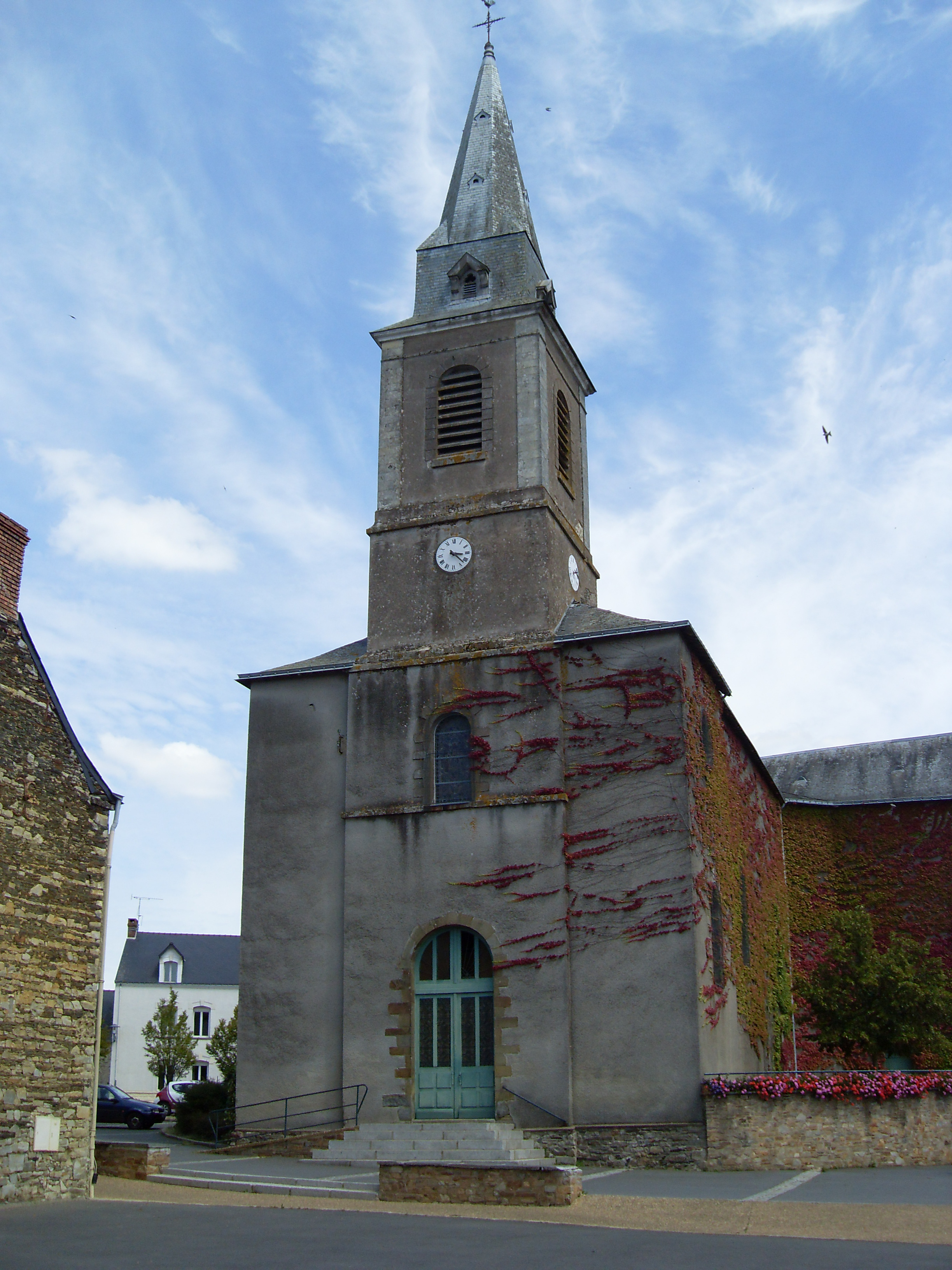
- The church in Sion-les-Mines

- Coat of arms
- Location of Sion-les-Mines
- Location within France Location within Pays de la Loire
- Coordinates: 47°44′09″N 1°35′26″W
- Country: France
- Region: Pays de la Loire
- Department: Loire-Atlantique
- Arrondissement: Châteaubriant-Ancenis
- Canton: Guémené-Penfao
- Intercommunality: Châteaubriant-Derval

Government
  - Mayor (2020–2026): Bruno Debray
- Area^{1}: 54.71 km^{2} (21.12 sq mi)
- Highest elevation: 88 m (289 ft)
- Lowest elevation: 17 m (56 ft)
- Population (2023): 1,658
  - Density: 30.31/km^{2} (78.49/sq mi)
- Demonym(s): Sionnaises, Sionnais
- Time zone: UTC+01:00 (CET)
  - Summer (DST): UTC+02:00 (CEST)
- INSEE/Postal code: 44197 /44590
- Website: www.mairie-sionlesmines.fr
- ^{1} French Land Register data, which excludes lakes, ponds, glaciers > 1 km^{2} (0.386 sq mi or 247 acres) and river estuaries.

Sion-les-Mines (French pronunciation: [sjɔ̃ le min]; Breton: Hezin-ar-Mengleuzioù) is a commune in the Loire-Atlantique department in western France.

== Geography ==
The river Chère flows westward through the commune.

== See also ==
- Communes of the Loire-Atlantique department
