= Mount Sion =

Mount Sion may refer to:

- an alternate spelling of Mount Zion in Jerusalem
- an alternate name given to Mount Hermon in Deuteronomy 4:48
- Mount Sion, Waterford, Ireland
  - Mount Sion GAA, a Gaelic Athletic Association club
  - Mount Sion Primary School
