= Zionites (Germany) =

The Zionites were a religious sect in the eighteenth century at Ronsdorf (Duchy of Berg, Germany).

== History ==
=== Elberfeld ===
The sect was created by members of the Philadelphian Society, who were a group of Christian dissenters and mystics based in England.

The Zionites were founded at Elberfeld in Wuppertal, Germany, in 1726 by Elias Eller and the pastor Daniel Schleiermacher.

Eller was the foreman of a factory owned by his wife, a rich widow. He had read the writings of ancient and modern visionaries and then formed an apocalyptic, millenarian system of his own. Schleiermacher, grandfather of the celebrated theologian Friedrich Schleiermacher, was also influenced by Eller.

The group had a prophetess named Anna Catharina vom Büchel, who was a baker's daughter. Vom Büchel had "dreams and visions, and saw apparitions". After the death of Eller's wife, vom Büchel and Eller became a married couple. The newlyweds were known as "the mother and father of Zion" and prophesied that Anna would bear the male saviour of the world. The couple's first child was a daughter, but Eller was able to console the society with Scriptural texts. A son was conceived in 1733, but died two years later.

The theology became centralised around Eller, and the "Christian morality" which the Zionites were founded upon was replaced by the craving for coarse and sensual pleasures.

=== Ronsdorf ===
In 1737, the sect left Elberfeld and founded the settlement of Ronsdorf which soon prospered. Through Eller's influence, Ronsdorf was raised by the State in 1745 to the rank of a city. Eller then received the office of burgomaster and lived in prosperity, reported as a 'tyrannical ruler'.

When Anna died unexpectedly in 1744, doubts arose in the mind of Schleiermacher, who was pastor at Ronsdorf. He confessed his mistake and sought to change Eller's mind, but Eller managed to maintain himself until death.

Schleiermacher left the group and moved to the Netherlands. The sect was carried on by the pastors who took Schleiermacher's place, including Eller's stepson, Blockhaus. A new pastor was chosen in 1768 and he and his successors brought the inhabitants of Ronsdorf back to Protestantism. The after-effects of the movement could be traced into the nineteenth century.
