= Osman Aktas =

French boxer (born 1976)

Osman Aktas (born 15 May 1976) is a French professional boxer.

== Biography ==
Osman moved to Châteaubriant when he was 6 years old. At the age of 14, he took up boxing, even though his parents were against it. Along the way, he took a 4-year break from the sport. While training in Saint-Nazaire, he worked as a mason.

== Titles ==
- Boxing
  - 2007 Super Featherweight French Champion
  - 2007 Featherweight French Champion
  - 2009 Featherweight European Union Champion
