= Châteaubriant =

Châteaubriant Châtiaoberiant (Gallo) Kastell-Briant (Breton)
- Subprefecture and commune
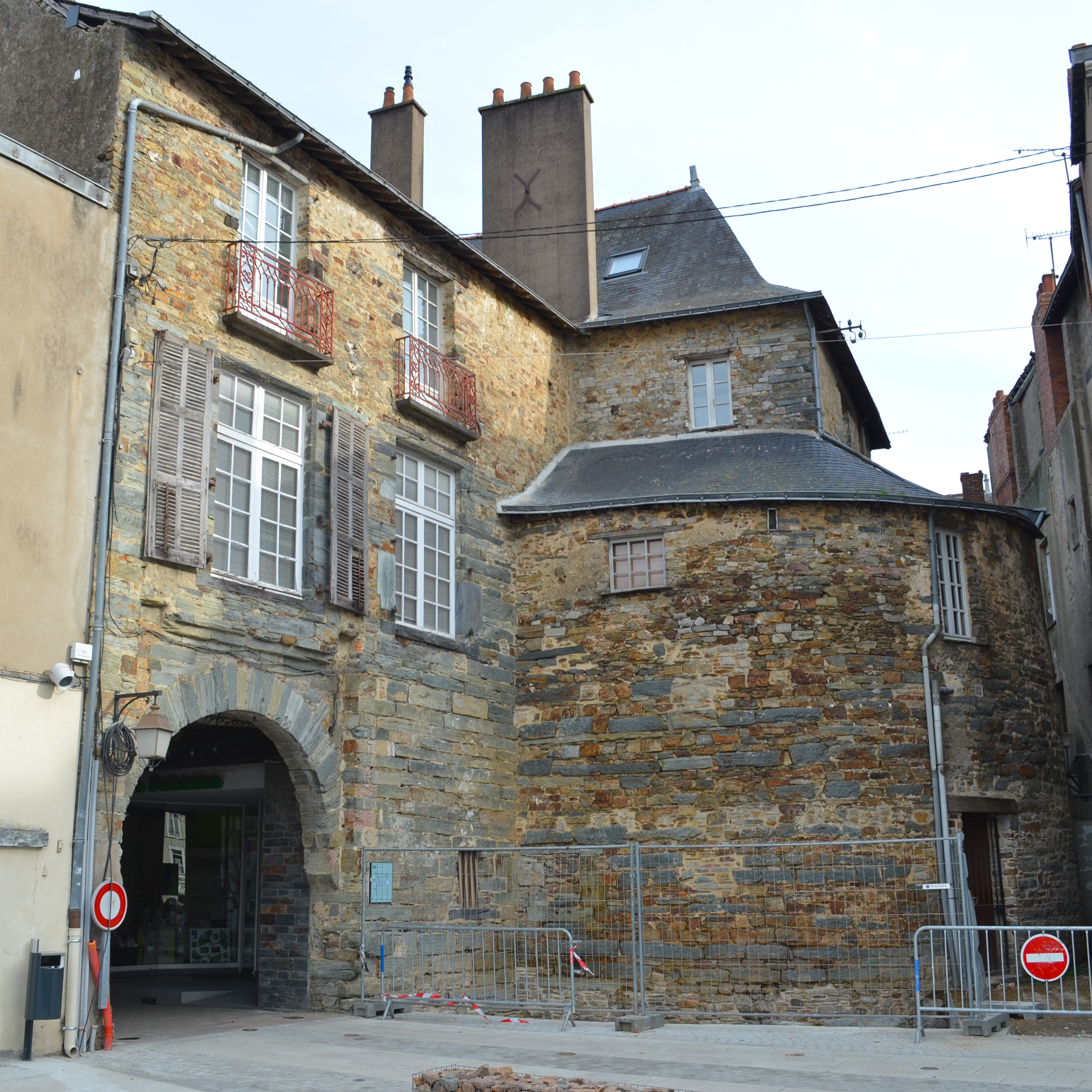
- Porte Neuve ("New Gate") in the old town

- Coat of arms
- Location of Châteaubriant
- Location within France Location within Pays de la Loire
- Coordinates: 47°43′04″N 1°22′30″W
- Country: France
- Region: Pays de la Loire
- Department: Loire-Atlantique
- Arrondissement: Châteaubriant-Ancenis
- Canton: Châteaubriant
- Intercommunality: CC Châteaubriant-Derval

Government
  - Mayor (2020–2026): Alain Hunault
- Area^{1}: 33.62 km^{2} (12.98 sq mi)
  - Metro: 635.9 km^{2} (245.5 sq mi)
- Highest elevation: 107 m (351 ft)
- Lowest elevation: 48 m (157 ft)
- Population (2023): 12,260
  - Density: 364.7/km^{2} (944.5/sq mi)
  - Metro (2018): 33,961
  - Metro density: 53.41/km^{2} (138.3/sq mi)
- Time zone: UTC+01:00 (CET)
  - Summer (DST): UTC+02:00 (CEST)
- INSEE/Postal code: 44036 /44110
- ^{1} French Land Register data, which excludes lakes, ponds, glaciers > 1 km^{2} (0.386 sq mi or 247 acres) and river estuaries.

Châteaubriant (French: [ʃɑtobʁijɑ̃]; Breton: Kastell-Briant; Gallo: Châtiaoberiant) is a town in western France, about 350 km (220 mi) southwest of Paris, and one of the three sous-préfectures of the Loire-Atlantique department. Châteaubriant is also situated in the historical and cultural region of Brittany, and it is the capital of the Pays de la Mée.

A part of the traditional province of Brittany, Châteaubriant also lies on the threshold of Anjou, and it was an important stronghold in northwestern France during the Middle Ages. The town appeared during the 11th century, around a castle and a priory. A fair, which still exists, was also founded in 1050. Châteaubriant played a certain role during the Mad War between France and Brittany and became a significant cultural centre in the 16th century, when the Renaissance château was built in the medieval fortress.

The town is situated between Nantes and Rennes, and tends to be economically oriented towards the latter. The medieval fair and cattle market are still important for the local economy, but Châteaubriant also developed a metallurgical industry during the 19th century, and then plastics manufacturing during the 20th century.

Châteaubriant is noteworthy for the Château de Châteaubriant, which combines a large medieval castle and a Renaissance palace. The town also has an 11th-century church and a medieval town centre, with half-timbered houses and remains of city walls. During the Second World War, Châteaubriant had a concentration camp, and it is known in France for the 27 hostages who were shot there in 1941.

== Geography ==
=== Location ===
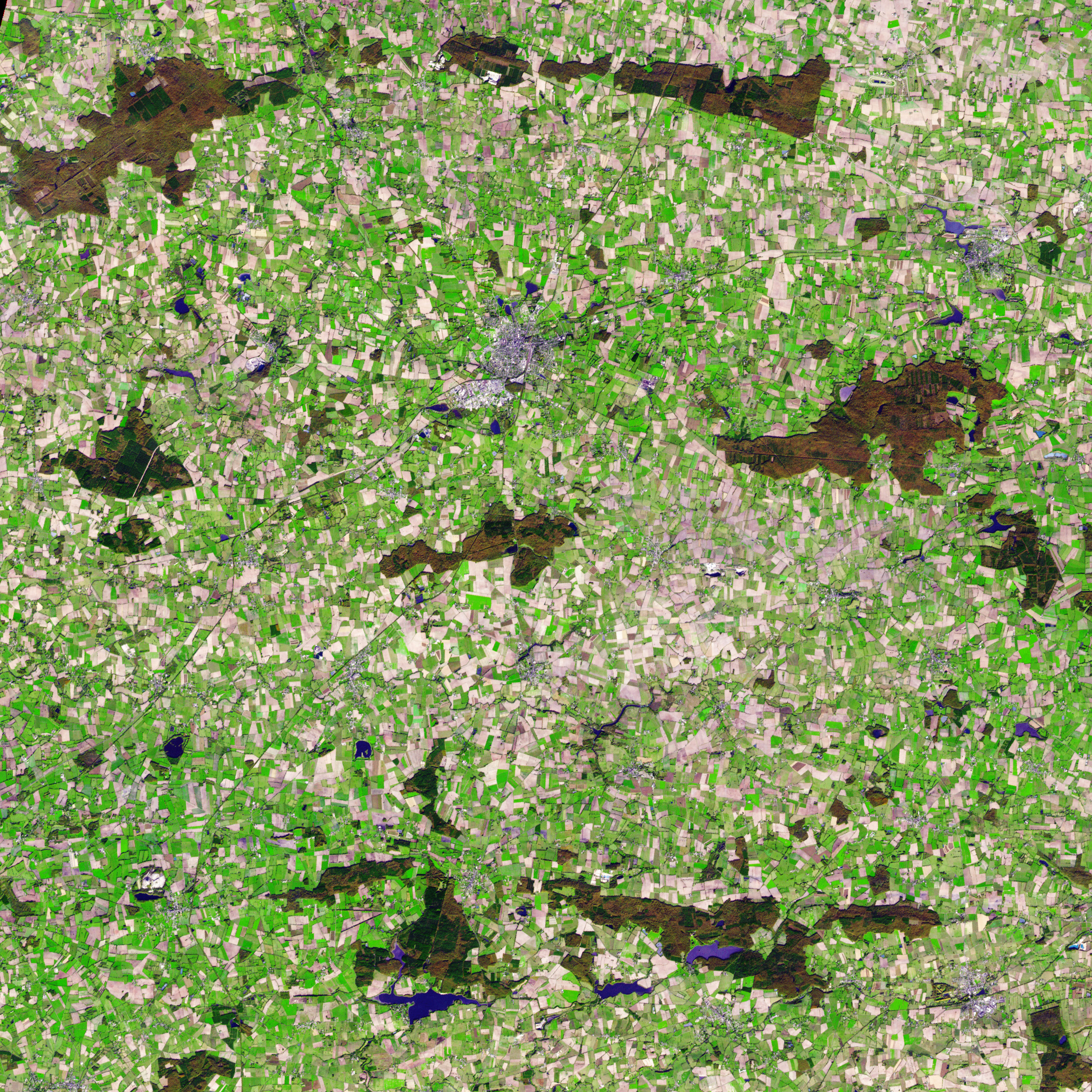
Simulated natural colour satellite image of Châteaubriant and the surrounding Pays de la Mée.

Châteaubriant lies at the north of the Loire-Atlantique département, in the middle of a triangle between Nantes, Angers and Rennes. The town is not situated on any of the roads that link the three cities, thus, it is somewhat isolated. The closest highway, linking Rennes to Nantes, is 30 km (19 mi) away.

Châteaubriant 49 km (30 mi) north of Ancenis, 68 km (42 mi) south of Rennes, 69 km (43 mi) north of Nantes, and 85 km (53 mi) west of Angers. The neighboring communes are Rougé, Saint-Aubin-des-Châteaux, Louisfert, Erbray, and Soudan.

According to the French statistical office, Châteaubriant is an urban commune, the only one in its urban unit. The metropolitan area, much wider, is made up of Châteaubriant plus several surrounding rural communes.

The commune of Châteaubriant itself encompasses not only the town, but also agricultural land and some hamlets. The main agricultural activities are forage and cereal growing, and cattle breeding (especially for beef and dairy production).

=== Geology and hydrography ===
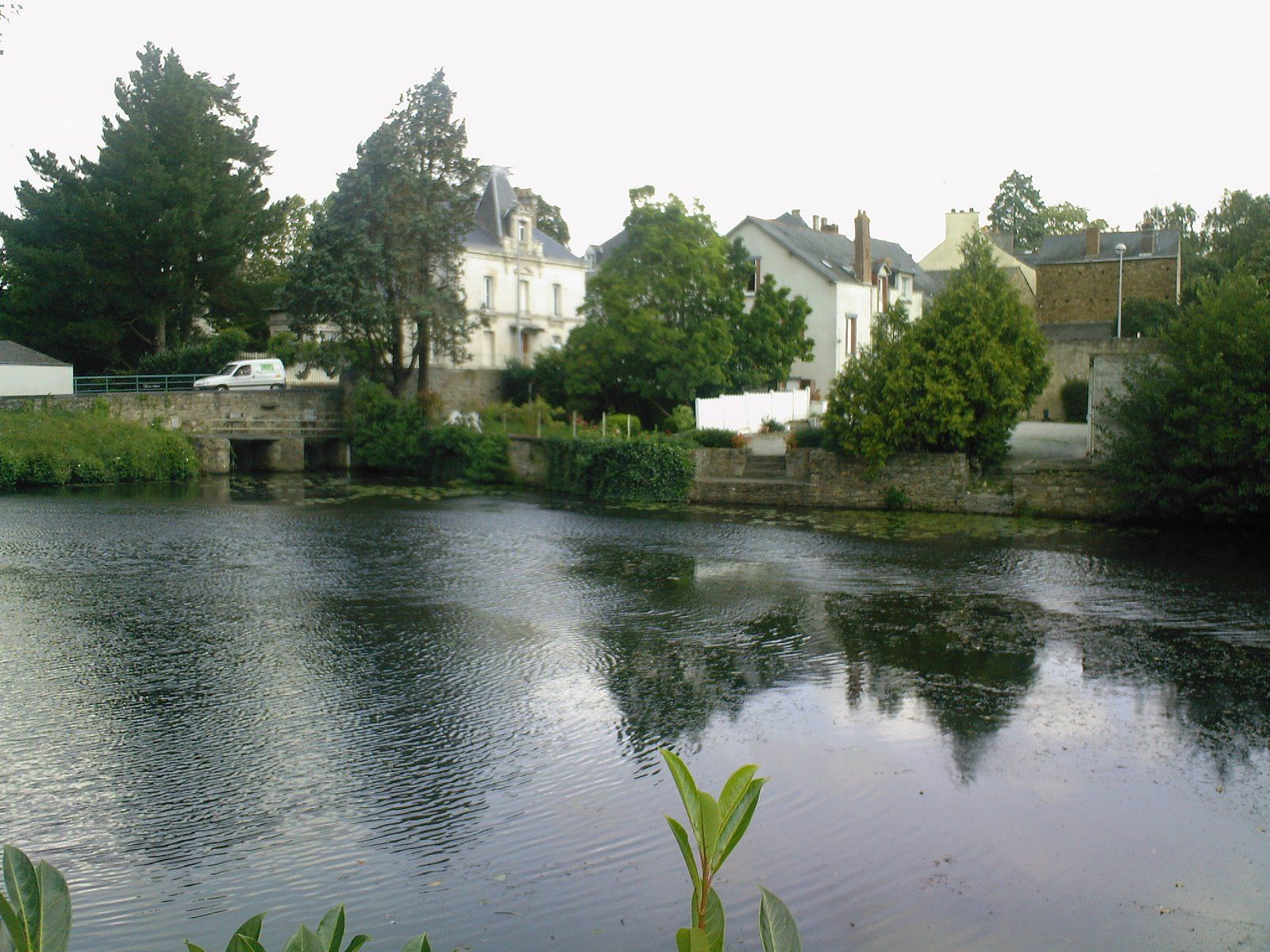
The Chère in Châteaubriant.

The town is built in the small drainage basin of the river Chère. Several streams flow in the Chère in Châteaubriant: the Rollard, the Choisel and the Ruisseau du Pont-Pirraud. The basin is limited by several hills belonging to the central axis of the Armorican massif which forms the Breton peninsula. The highest hill is 107 metres high. Several ponds are supplied by the streams, like the Étang de Choisel and the Étang de Deil. Both were created by small dams.

The subsoil consists of old sedimentary deposits of schist and sandstone. These deposits came after the Cadomian Orogeny, and they were deformed by the tectonic activity.

=== Climate ===
Châteaubriant enjoys an oceanic climate with frequent but weak rain. Temperatures are mild with little variations.

Climate data for Châteaubriant (Soudan) (1994–2020 normals, extremes 1994–2020)
Month	Jan	Feb	Mar	Apr	May	Jun	Jul	Aug	Sep	Oct	Nov	Dec	Year
Record high °C (°F)	16.5 (61.7)	19.5 (67.1)	23.5 (74.3)	28.0 (82.4)	30.5 (86.9)	36.5 (97.7)	39.0 (102.2)	39.0 (102.2)	34.5 (94.1)	29.5 (85.1)	22.0 (71.6)	18.0 (64.4)	39.0 (102.2)
Mean daily maximum °C (°F)	9.0 (48.2)	10.3 (50.5)	13.3 (55.9)	16.2 (61.2)	19.6 (67.3)	23.2 (73.8)	25.4 (77.7)	25.4 (77.7)	22.3 (72.1)	17.6 (63.7)	12.6 (54.7)	9.5 (49.1)	17.0 (62.6)
Daily mean °C (°F)	5.9 (42.6)	6.5 (43.7)	8.6 (47.5)	10.7 (51.3)	14.1 (57.4)	17.3 (63.1)	19.2 (66.6)	19.2 (66.6)	16.4 (61.5)	13.2 (55.8)	9.0 (48.2)	6.3 (43.3)	12.2 (54.0)
Mean daily minimum °C (°F)	2.8 (37.0)	2.6 (36.7)	3.9 (39.0)	5.3 (41.5)	8.6 (47.5)	11.5 (52.7)	13.1 (55.6)	13.0 (55.4)	10.5 (50.9)	8.7 (47.7)	5.4 (41.7)	3.1 (37.6)	7.4 (45.3)
Record low °C (°F)	−11.5 (11.3)	−11.5 (11.3)	−10.0 (14.0)	−3.0 (26.6)	−1.0 (30.2)	2.0 (35.6)	5.0 (41.0)	4.0 (39.2)	0.5 (32.9)	−4.5 (23.9)	−7.0 (19.4)	−9.0 (15.8)	−11.5 (11.3)
Average precipitation mm (inches)	89.9 (3.54)	72.6 (2.86)	58.4 (2.30)	59.1 (2.33)	61.9 (2.44)	57.3 (2.26)	47.3 (1.86)	48.5 (1.91)	60.6 (2.39)	81.4 (3.20)	89.0 (3.50)	100.4 (3.95)	826.4 (32.54)
Average precipitation days (≥ 1.0 mm)	13.6	11.0	10.2	9.4	10.2	8.0	7.3	7.6	8.2	11.7	12.9	13.7	123.9
Source: Meteociel

=== Transport ===
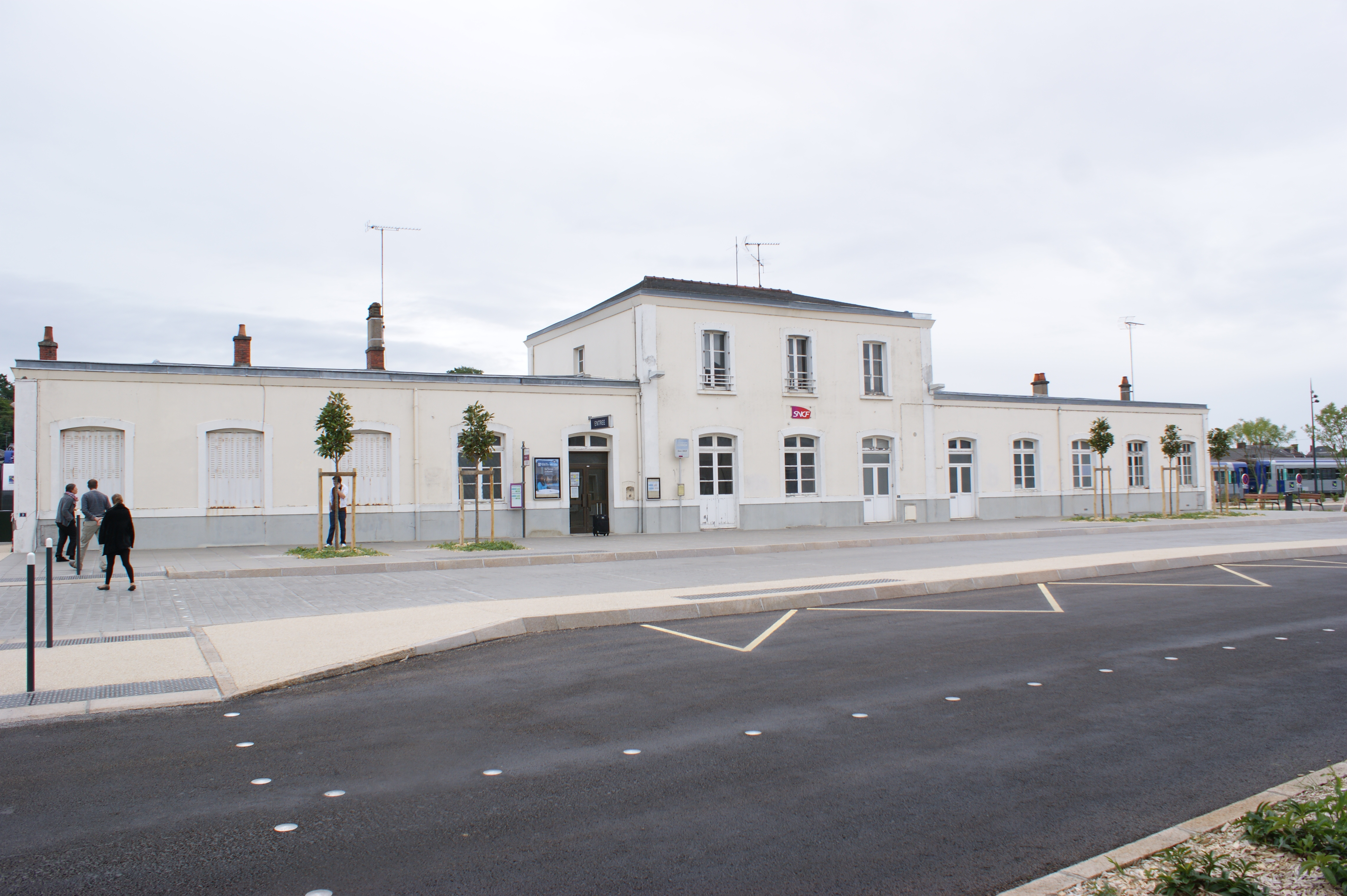
The railway station.

Châteaubriant is connected to the regional major roads and to the surrounding villages by several minor roads, such as the RD 163 which connects the town to Rennes and Candé, the RD 178, which goes to Nantes, and the RD 771, linking Châteaubriant to Laval and Nozay.

Châteaubriant has its own bus company, the "Castelbus". It operates a small network comprising 30 stops. The town also has a coach station served by the Loire-Atlantique coach network.

The railway station provides several departures a day to Rennes on a local line. The track continues south to Nantes, but this portion was closed in 1980. The reopening of the line to Nantes is scheduled for 2013, with a new tram-train.

== Toponymy ==
Châteaubriant is a relatively young city for France, because it was not built before the 11th century. Thus, the name of the town is not mentioned before that period. Châteaubriant means "Briant's castle", and refers to Brient, the founder of the castle and of the town. Such origin is common among other French cities founded at the same period; it is for example visible on Château-Gontier, "Gontier's castle", Châteauroux, "Raoul's castle", and on Laval, which was first called Laval-Guyon, "Guy's valley". The town was first mentioned with the Latin Castrum Brieni or Castrum Brientii, and the first mention in French, in 1266, is Cheteau Brient. During the 15th century, the "e" of Brient became "a", and the final "t" was often replaced with a "d" until the standardization of the name in the 19th century.

The standard Latin translation is Castrobriandum but the medieval forms Briandi Castrum and Brientii Castrum are still accepted. In Breton language, the town is called Kastell-Briant, and in Gallo language, the local dialect, it is called Châtiaoberiant (ABCD transcription, pronounced [ʃɑtjawbɘʀjã]).

During the French Revolution, many towns and villages which had a name with a reference to religion or feudalism had it changed. As "Châteaubriant" makes a reference to medieval lords, the town was renamed Montagne-sur-Chère ("hill on the Chère River"). The town did not keep this name for long, and it was called "Châteaubriant" again by 1801.

== History ==
=== Heraldry ===
The medieval coat of arms and the modern version.

Châteaubriant has had at least three coats of arms: two primitive ones dating from the Middle Ages, and a modern one, adopted by the town council in 1890.

The lords of Châteaubriant originally bore the arms Gules, semy of pine cones Or (many yellow pine cones on a red field) or Gules, papelonny Or (red with yellow fish scales). During the battle of Al Mansurah, an episode of the Seventh Crusade, the lord of Châteaubriant saved Louis IX of France. The King permitted him to replace the pine cones with fleurs de lys, the royal French symbol. The coat of arms was henceforth Gules, semy of fleurs de lys Or.

The modern coat of arms, dating from 1890, is Party per pale, first Azure three fleurs de lys Or a baton Gules, second Ermine, overall an escutcheon Gules, semy of fleurs de lys Or. The left part, three fleurs de lys and a red baton, are the arms of the princes of Condé, who owned Châteaubriant from the 17th century until the French Revolution, and the right part is the arms of the duchy of Brittany.

=== Origins ===
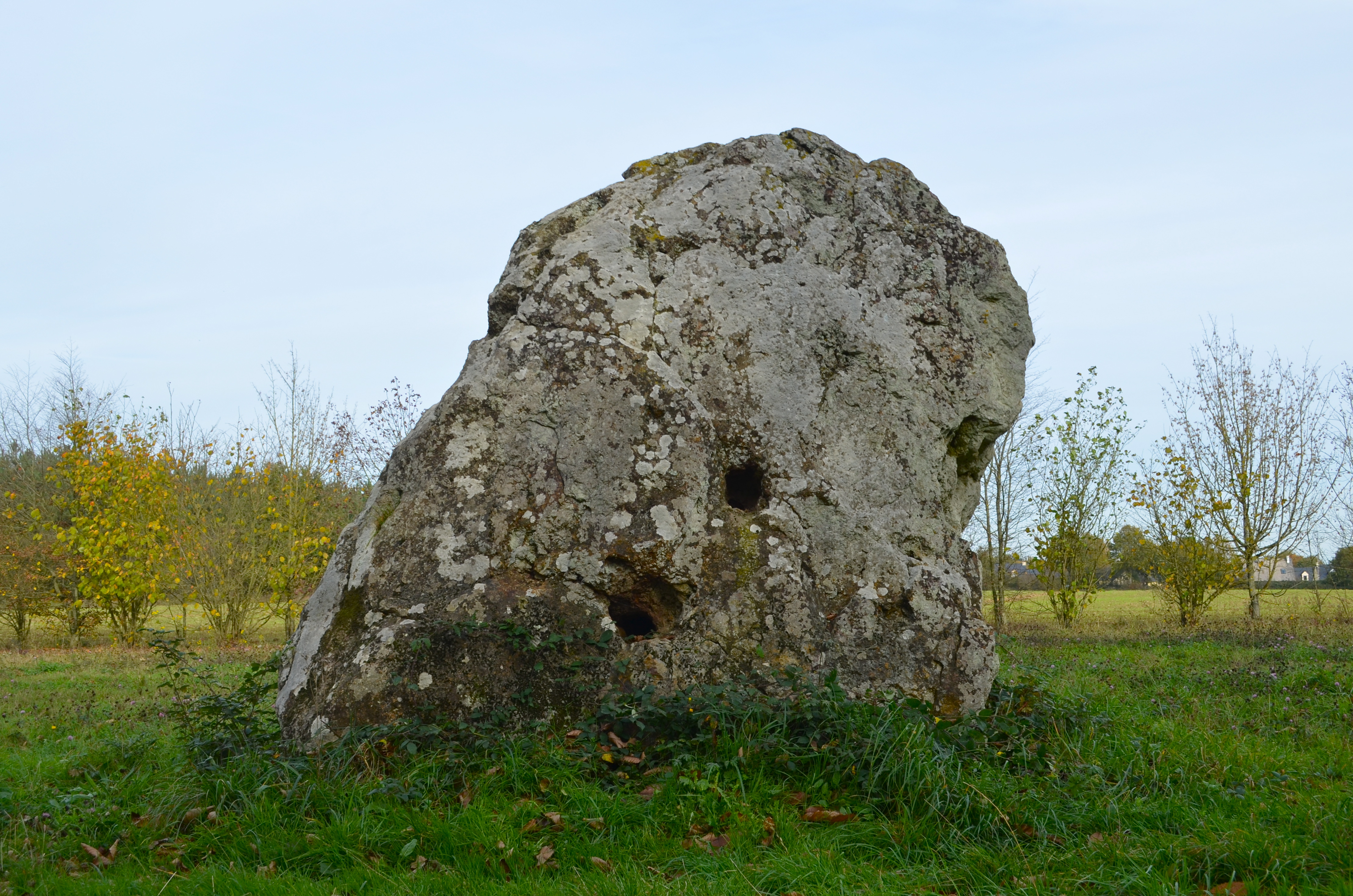
A menhir in Saint-Aubin-des-Châteaux.

Several menhirs are visible around Châteaubriant, notably on the communes of Rougé, Treffieux, Lusanger and Saint-Aubin-des-Châteaux. In Châteaubriant itself, Neolithic axes were found around the suburb of Béré. This suburb was probably founded by Gauls who exploited the small iron ore which can be found there. Their ethnicity is unknown, because the region is located at the border between several Gallic people, such as the Andecavi, the Redones and the Namnetes. Remains of Roman buildings were discovered in Béré in 1876, and the suburb was at the crossroads between the Roman roads linking Candé, Nantes and Rennes.

The region is invaded by the Breton people during the 6th century. It is then a part of the Breton kingdom. Béré remains an important location, with a mint, a Christian sanctuary, forges and a market.

=== Foundation ===
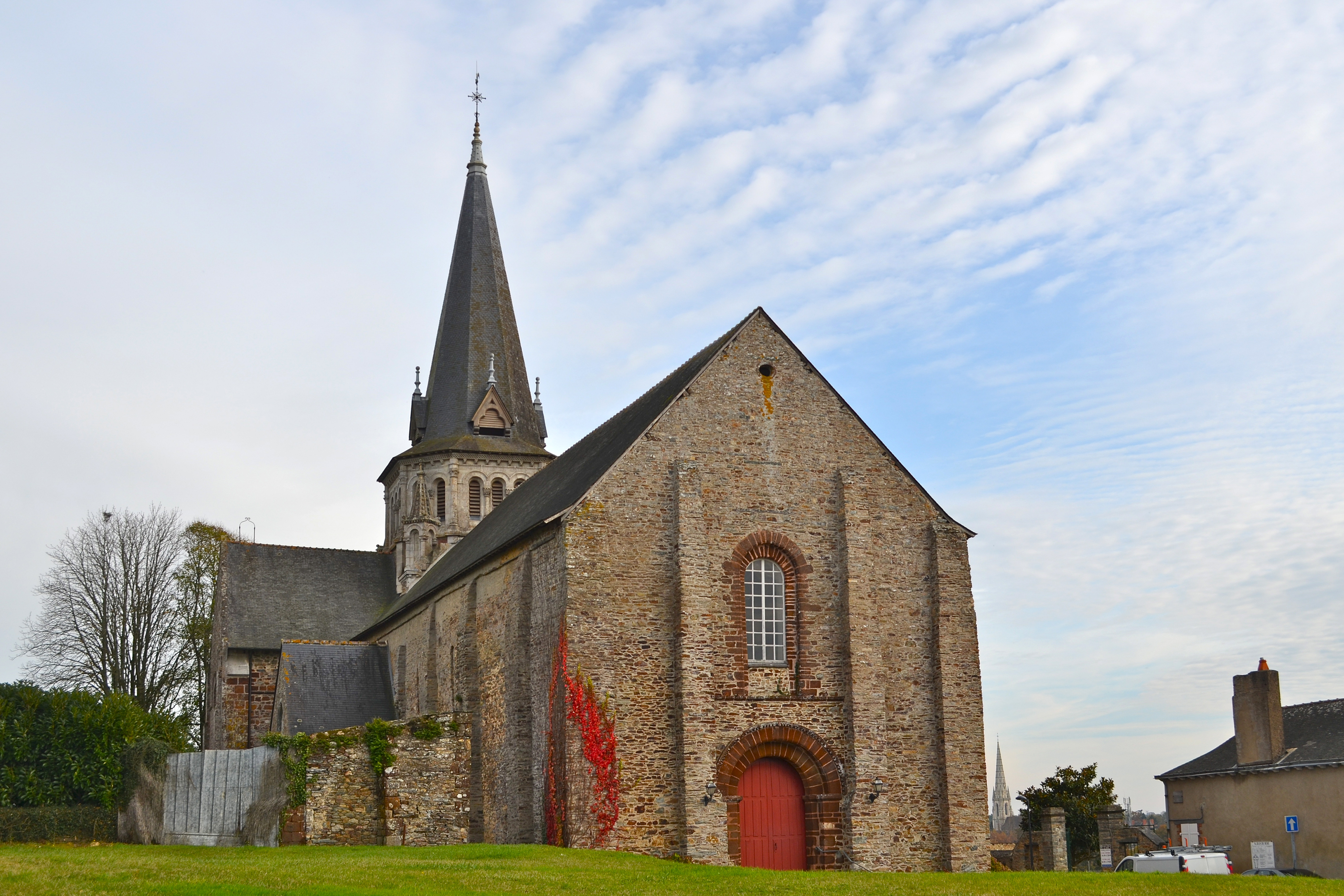
The Saint-Jean-de-Béré church, founded in the 11th century

The history of Châteaubriant itself began in the 11th century when Brient (an envoy of the Count of Rennes) built a castle on a motte bordering the Chère and Rollard rivers. Later, he also founded the priory Saint-Sauveur-de-Béré and a fair in the Béré suburb.

The fortress of Châteaubriant was then a part of eastern Brittany's defensive line, known as the Marches of Brittany, along with the other walled towns of Vitré and Fougères (both in Ille-et-Vilaine) and Ancenis and Clisson (both in Loire Atlantique), which formed the first line of defense against the French Kingdom. Later in the 12th century the town developed around the western flank of the castle. This new town overwhelmed the old Béré suburb, which nonetheless remained a distinct parish.

=== Middle Ages ===
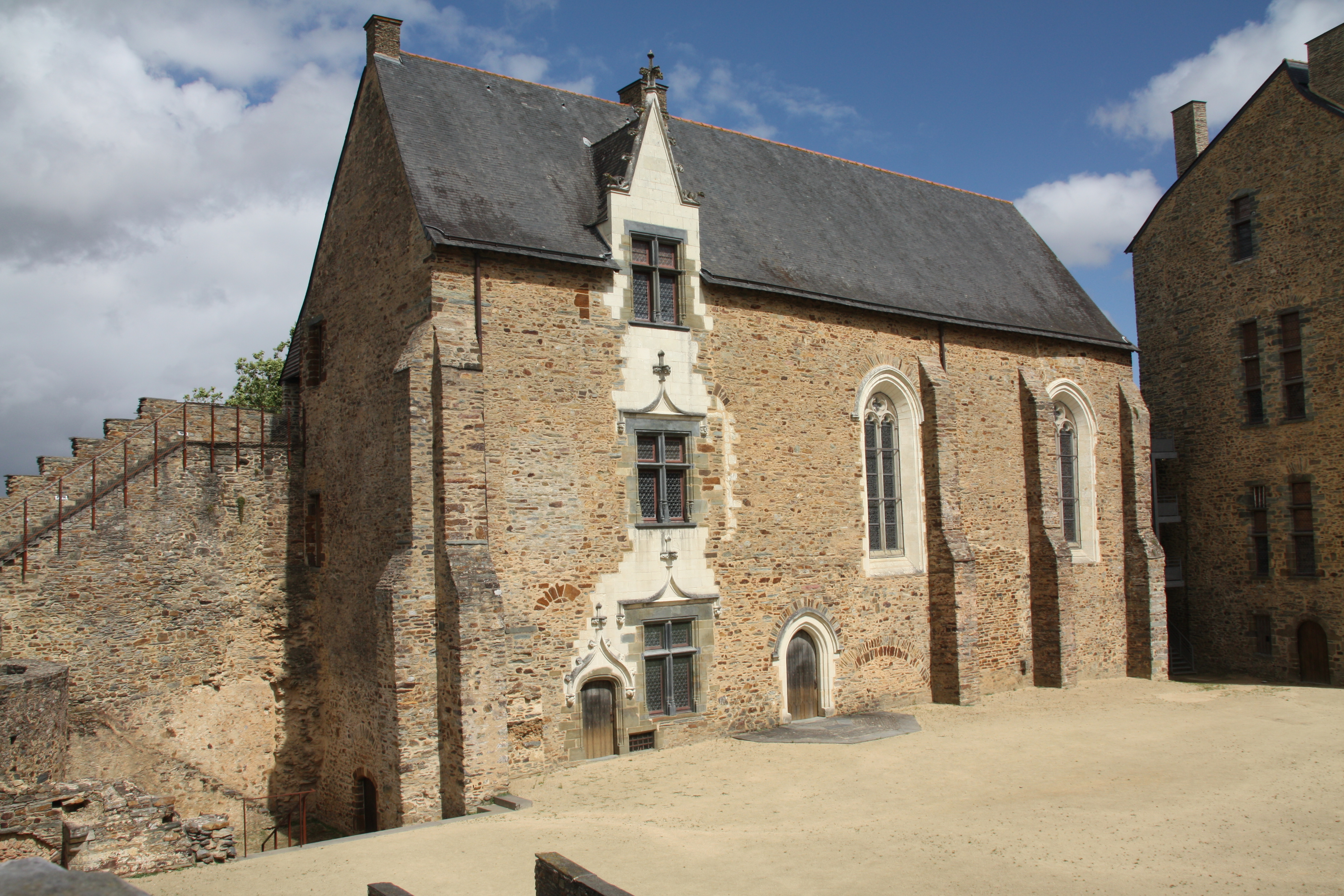
The chapel of the castle

As the castle was in a very strategic location, the town was subject to several battles and invasions during the Middle Ages. One of the largest sieges was commissioned by Louis IX of France in 1235. Insecurity led the lords to raise city walls during the 13th century. The walls were improved and extended several times and were finally completed in the 15th century.Bouvet, Christian (2002). Histoire et patrimoine du pays de Châteaubriant (ed.). Châteaubriant histoires. p. 75. The moat was fed by the Chère on the north and by the Rollard on the south. This stream was also crossing the inner town by the east, until it was covered during the 19th century. The walls had five gates of which only one still exists today.

The primitive House of Châteaubriant, whose founder was Brient, became extinct in the 14th century. One of the best known family members was Jeanne Louise de Belleville, Jeanne de Clisson also known as the Lioness of Brittany who married her first husband, 19-year-old Geoffrey de Châteaubriant VIII and had two children.

The barony of Châteaubriant was inherited by the House of Dinan, another Breton noble family. After the Dinan became themselves extinct, the barony went to the House of Laval.

In 1486, the baroness of Châteaubriant, Françoise de Dinan, opposed Francis II of Brittany and signed the "Châteaubriant treaty" by which barons of Brittany asked the King of France to settle a Breton internal dispute. The treaty, which betrayed the authority of Francis II, was one of the reasons of the Mad War, and showed the weakness of the Duchy of Brittany as a political entity. Brittany and France went to war, Breton castles were taken one after the other by the French. Châteaubriant was besieged in 1488 and surrendered after one week.

=== Renaissance ===
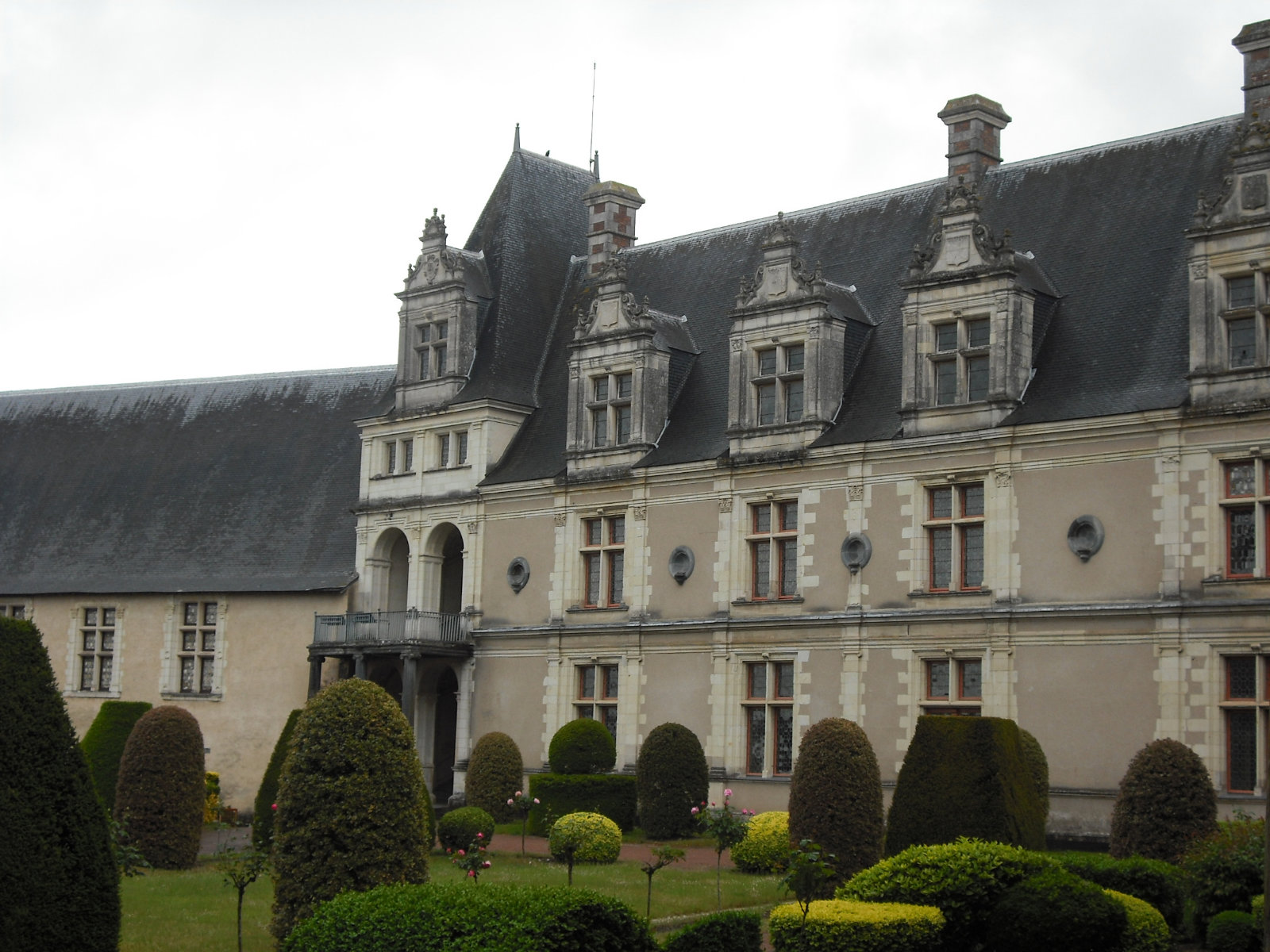
The Renaissance château

After the war, the castle was upgraded to fit the new military techniques, and it was redecorated in the First Renaissance style. During the 16th century, Jean de Laval, governor of Brittany from 1531 to 1542, built a new Renaissance palace inside the old castle for his wife, Françoise de Foix. At his death, Jean de Laval went on to bequeath his barony to Anne de Montmorency. During the Renaissance, Brittany was annexed to France, and three Kings of France visited Châteaubriant: Francis I, Henry II and Charles IX.

During the French Wars of Religion, Châteaubriant was one of the headquarters of the Catholic League, because the Montmorency family which owned the barony was on the Catholic side. At the beginning of the 17th century, the last Montmorency was executed for betrayal and his possessions were given to the House of Condé.

=== Revolution ===
During the French Revolution, Châteaubriant was the scene of violent fighting between Republicans and Royalists. It is at this period that Victor Hugo's parents met in the town. They were Brutus Hugo, a young Republican lieutenant, and a local, Sophie Trébuchet.

=== 19th century ===
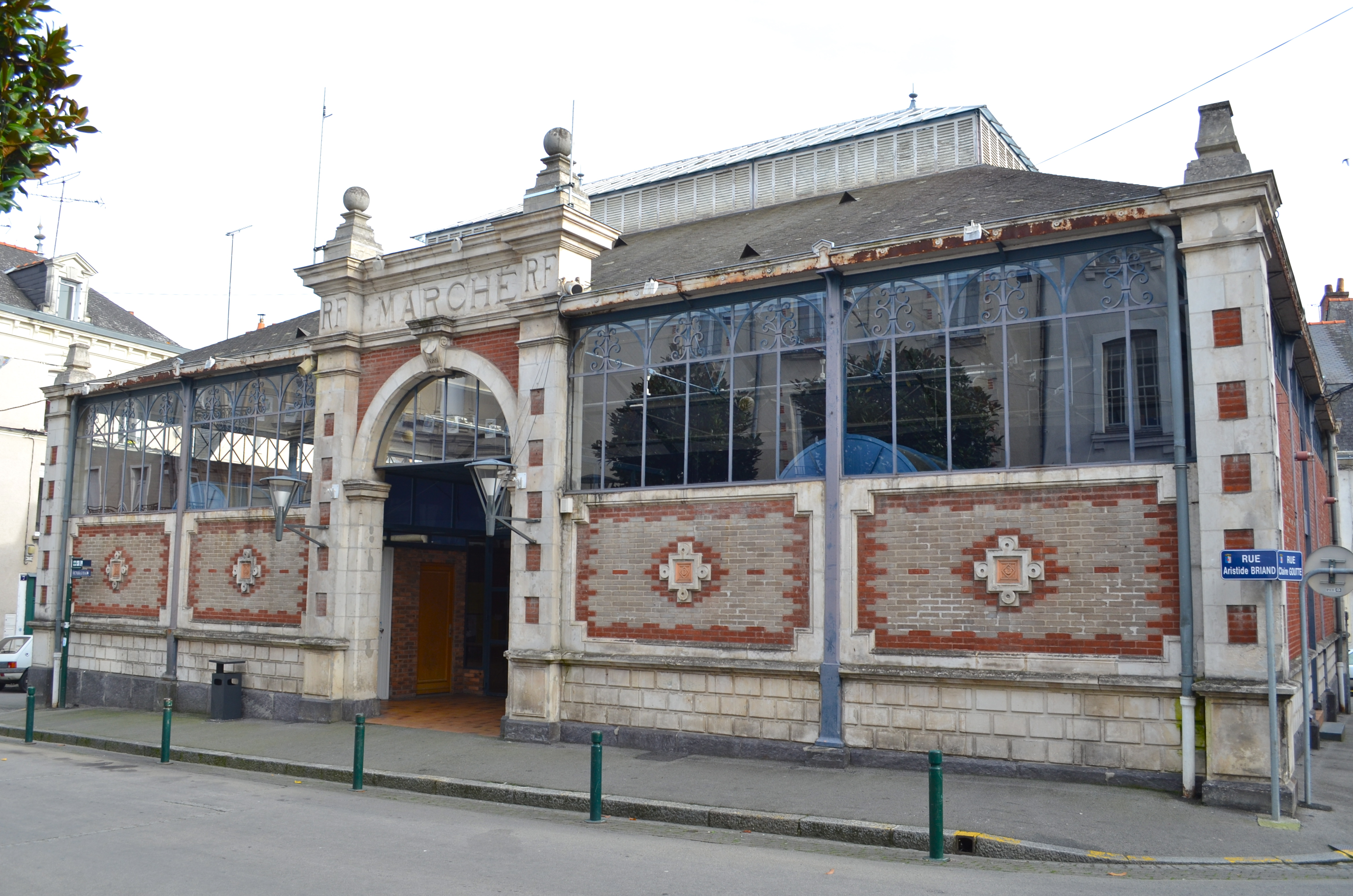
The covered market, built in 1900

During the 19th century, the town was modernized. Most of the city walls were destroyed, new streets were built and the parish church was reconstructed. A new town hall and a covered market were also built, and the castle became a courthouse and the seat of the sous-préfecture. Several factories were founded in the suburbs, such as a foundry in 1856 and a plough manufacture. Several iron mines were opened in the region, for example in Rougé, Teillay and Sion. Three railroads were built between 1877 and 1887 linking Châteaubriant with Nantes, Sablé-sur-Sarthe, Redon, Rennes and Ancenis. A gas supply system was opened in 1876.

=== Second World War ===
The concentration camp of Choisel opened in 1940. Some 45,000 war prisoners, mainly French but also British, were interned there. In 1941, the prisoners were sent to Germany, and replaced by Gypsies, black market traffickers, prostitutes, and finally political activists, mostly Communists, treated as hostages. Following the death of Karl Hotz, Feldkommandant of the Feldgericht of Nantes, killed by Resistants, 27 hostages were shot in a stone-pit outside the town on 22 October 1941. 21 other hostages were executed outside Nantes the same day. Among the Châteaubriant hostages was Guy Môquet, a 17-year-old boy who became a symbol of the French Resistance.

In 1944, the town was bombed by the Allies. They were targeting the foundries, but the bombs also destroyed a part of the castle and the town centre.

After the war, Châteaubriant was quickly rebuilt and extended towards the southwest, with the construction of a new industrial zone during the 1960s.

== Administration ==
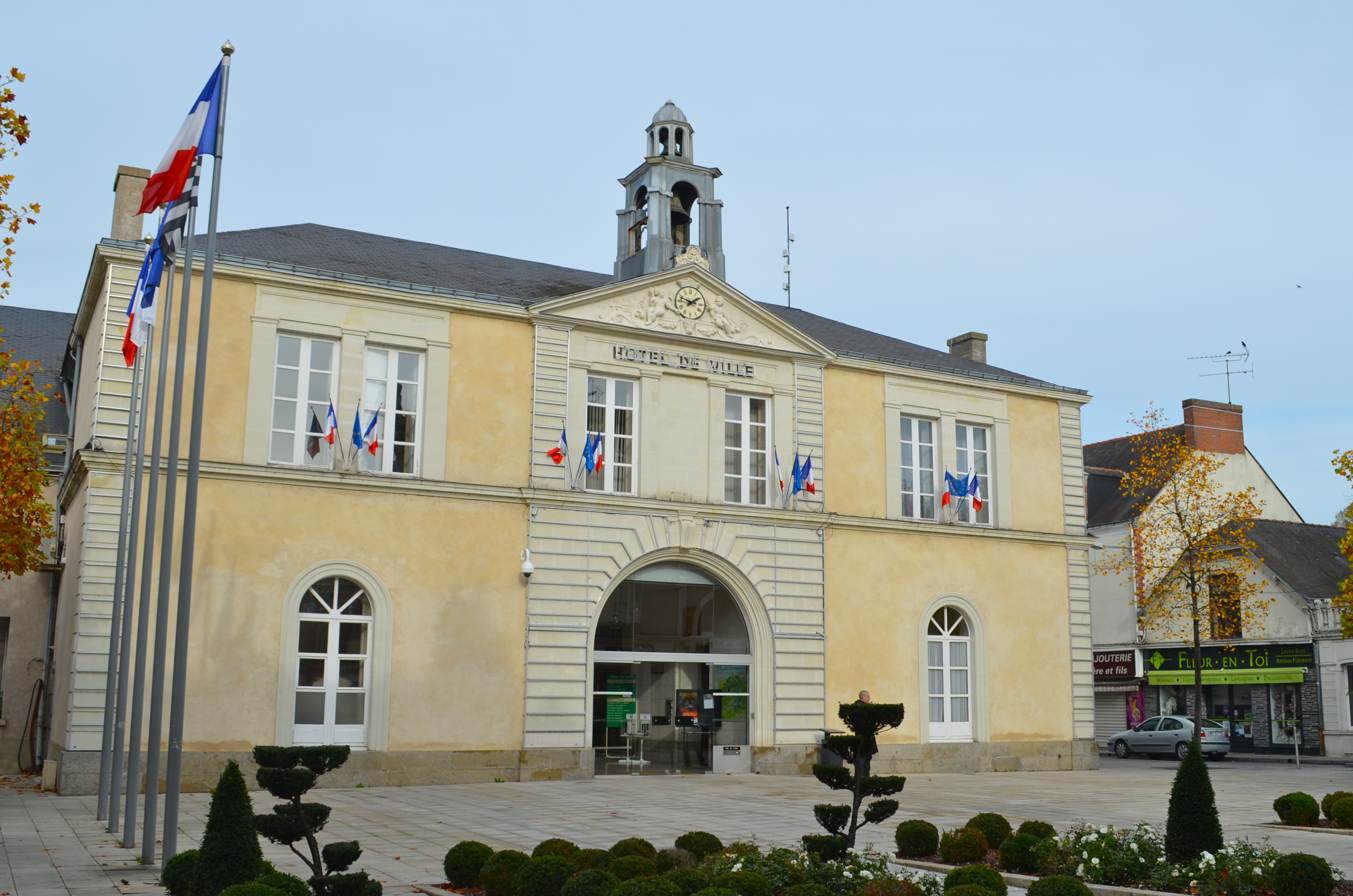
The town hall

Châteaubriant is located in the Pays de la Loire region, and in the sixth circonscription of the Loire-Atlantique département. It is a sous-préfecture, and the chief town of a canton.

The election results of Châteaubriant do not show a clear political orientation. The town has been governed by left and right-wing mayors and if the citizens favored Nicolas Sarkozy as president in 2007, they massively voted for François Hollande in 2012.

Châteaubriant had a court until 2009. Since then, the nearest court is in Nantes.

List of successive mayors
Period	Name	Party
2001–	Alain Hunault	UMP
1995–2001	Martine Buron	PS
1989–1995	Martine Buron	PS

== Population ==
In 2018, the functional area (aire d'attraction), which encompasses Châteaubriant plus 19 surrounding communes (636 km^{2} in total), had 33,961 inhabitants.

The population of Châteaubriant is aging, 29.1% of the population being older than 60 (22.7% on the French national level).

Historical population

Year	Pop.	±% p.a.
1793	3,324	—
1800	3,049	−1.23%
1806	2,768	−1.60%
1821	3,274	+1.13%
1831	3,709	+1.26%
1841	3,732	+0.06%
1846	3,867	+0.71%
1851	4,064	+1.00%
1856	4,287	+1.07%
1861	4,636	+1.58%
1866	4,834	+0.84%
1872	5,111	+0.93%
1876	5,228	+0.57%
1881	5,564	+1.25%
1886	6,177	+2.11%
1891	6,523	+1.10%
1896	7,001	+1.42%
1901	7,234	+0.66%

Year	Pop.	±% p.a.
1906	7,169	−0.18%
1911	7,479	+0.85%
1921	7,692	+0.28%
1926	7,989	+0.76%
1931	8,112	+0.31%
1936	8,271	+0.39%
1946	9,276	+1.15%
1954	9,284	+0.01%
1962	10,852	+1.97%
1968	11,986	+1.67%
1975	13,231	+1.42%
1982	14,023	+0.83%
1990	12,783	−1.15%
1999	12,065	−0.64%
2007	12,466	+0.41%
2012	11,905	−0.92%
2017	11,974	+0.12%
2023	12,260	+0.39%

Source: EHESS and INSEE (1968-2023)

== Economy ==
Châteaubriant, which is located in a vast rural area, offers many services not available in villages. The town centre comprises many shops and a vast shopping centre is located on the western outskirts. The town has 1105 firms, of which 76 specialise in industry, 96 in construction, 236 in trade and 697 in services. Industry is mainly represented by food processing, with the second biggest cattle market in France and an important slaughterhouse. Metallurgy is also important, with plough and rail-material production, but plastic production is replacing it.

The foire de Béré, which has taken place every September since 1050, is one of the oldest fairs in Europe. It is a big event for the region, with furniture, leisure and car displays, and agricultural shows. A funfair is always held at the entrance. The fair itself welcomes 55,000 visitors every year, but the funfair is more successful, with 100,000 visitors.

== Culture ==
=== Sights ===
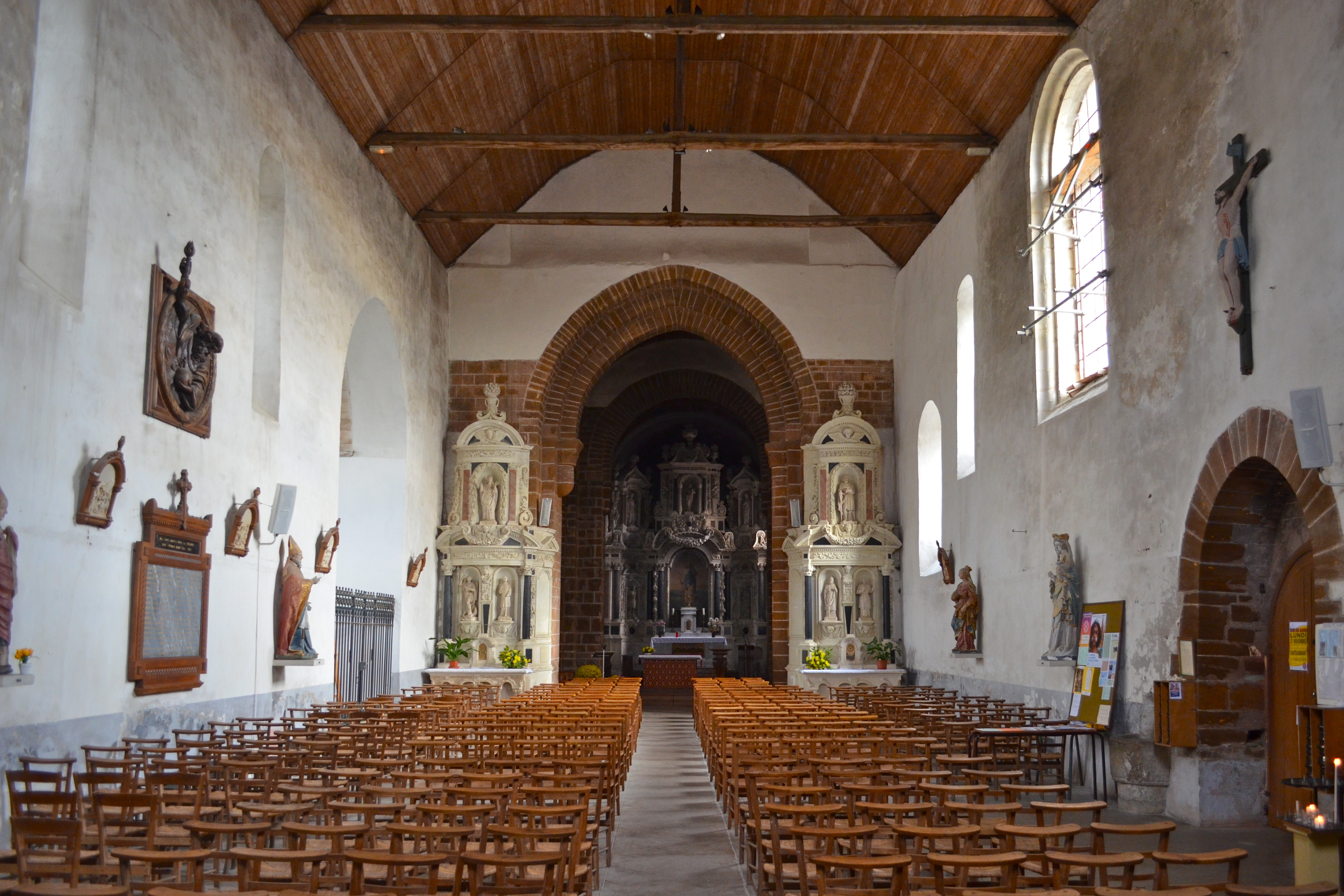
Inside Saint-Jean-de-Béré church.

The château de Châteaubriant is an important testimony to French medieval and Renaissance architecture. It combines an upper and a lower bailey encircled by walls and towers mostly dating from the 13th century. In the upper bailey are located the 12th century chapel and the 14th century keep and two halls. These halls and keep, where the lord was living, are built on the location of the older motte-and-bailey castle. The Renaissance palace, made of three wings and a long gallery, is built in the lower ward.

The little town centre dates back to the Middle Ages, and several half-timbered houses are visible. They mostly date back to the 15th century. The city walls were destroyed during the 19th century, but the 16th century Porte Neuve ("new gate") and some towers are preserved. The covered market, built in 1900, is an exhibition venue. The Saint-Nicolas parish church was rebuilt after 1850. It is a small replica of the Saint-Nicolas church in Nantes.

The Saint-Jean-de-Béré church is located outside the centre. The church was built around 1100, and still has its original wooden ceiling. Later, during the 16th century, the three baroque altarpieces were set in the choir. The bell-tower was destroyed by a storm in 1705 and only rebuilt in 1889. This monument is one of the rare medieval churches that are still visible in Loire-Atlantique. See The works of Jean Fréour Sculptor of statue of St Rita.

The quarry at the Sablière is where 27 hostages were executed in 1941. It is now a memorial.

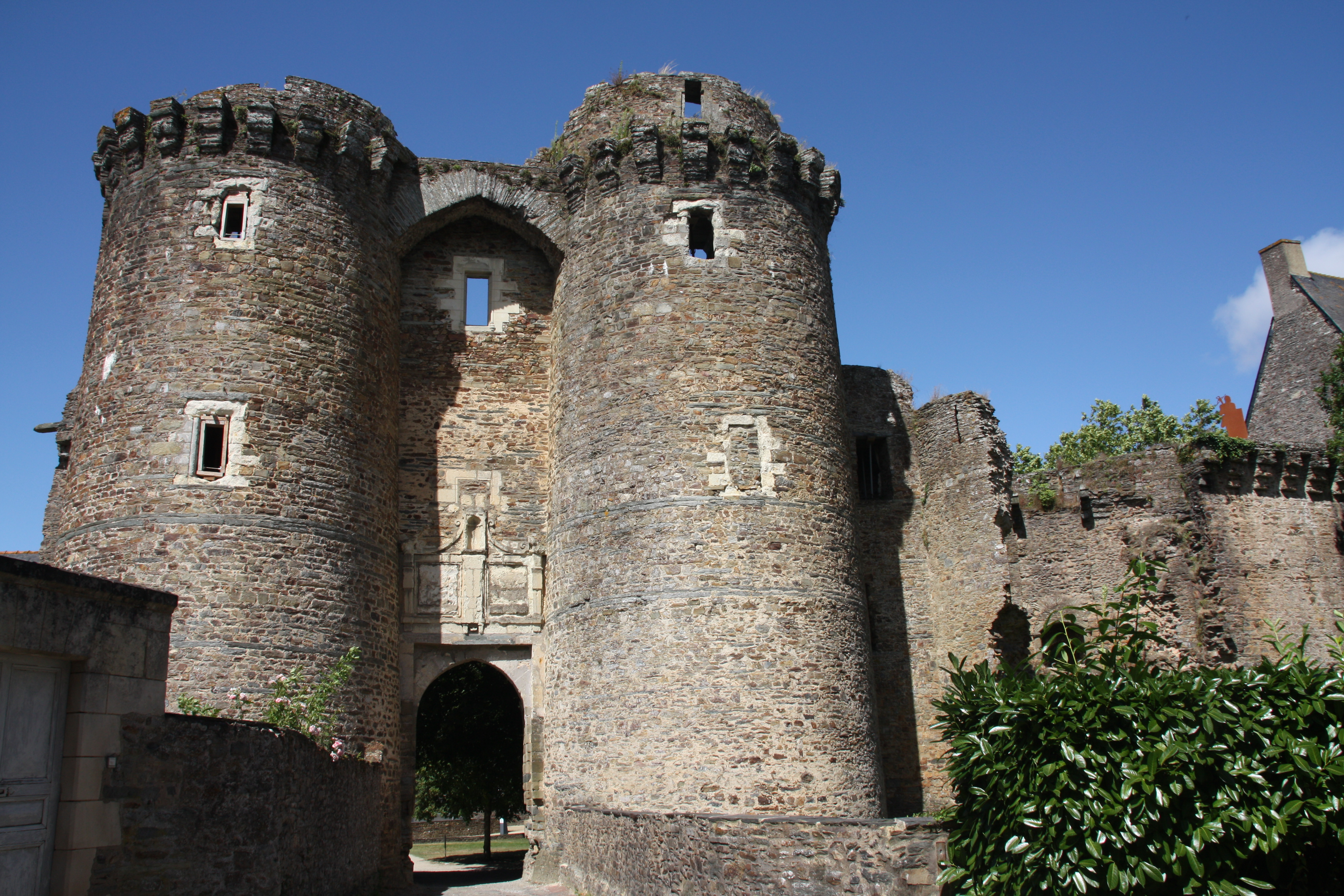
A gate in the castle.

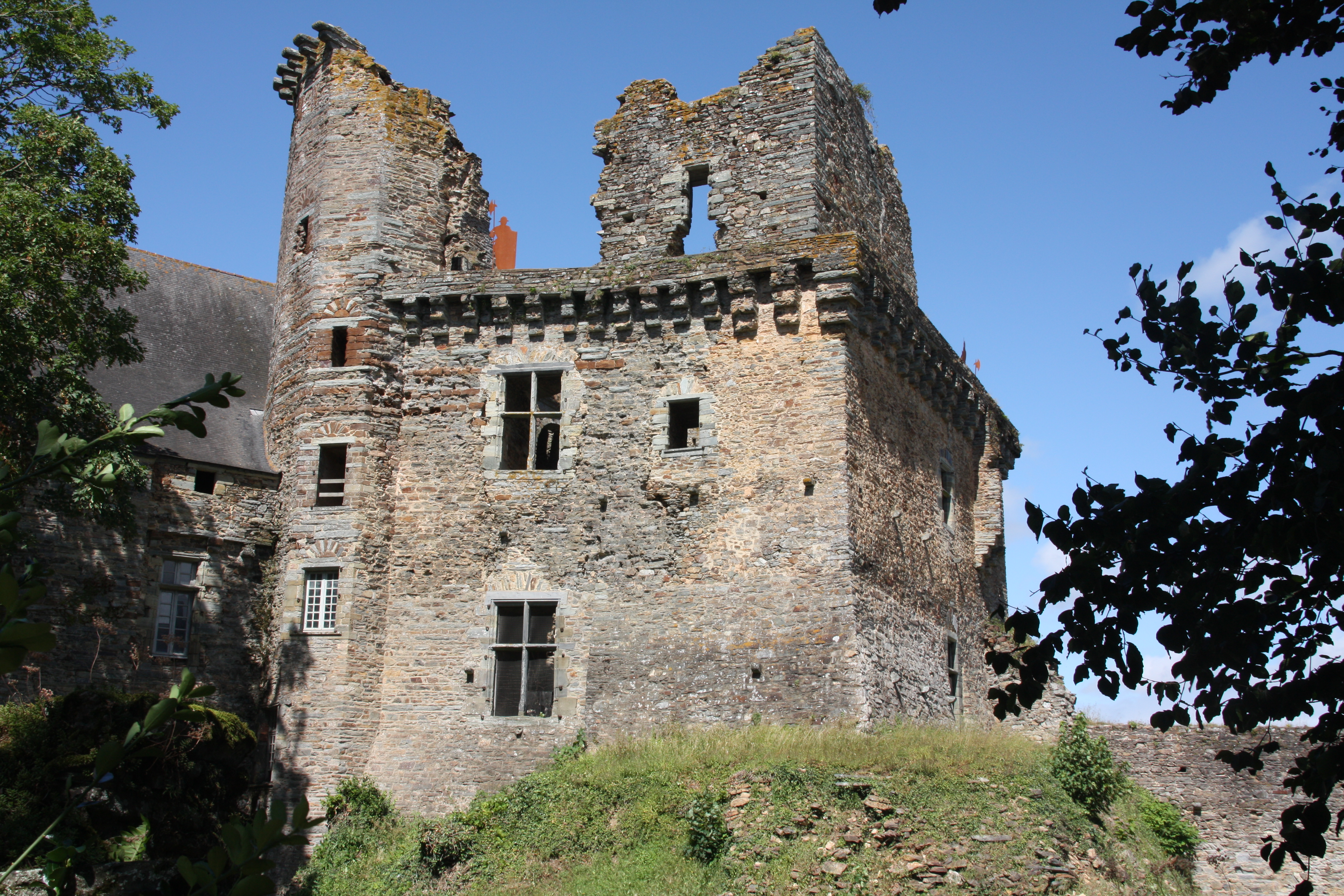
The keep of the castle.

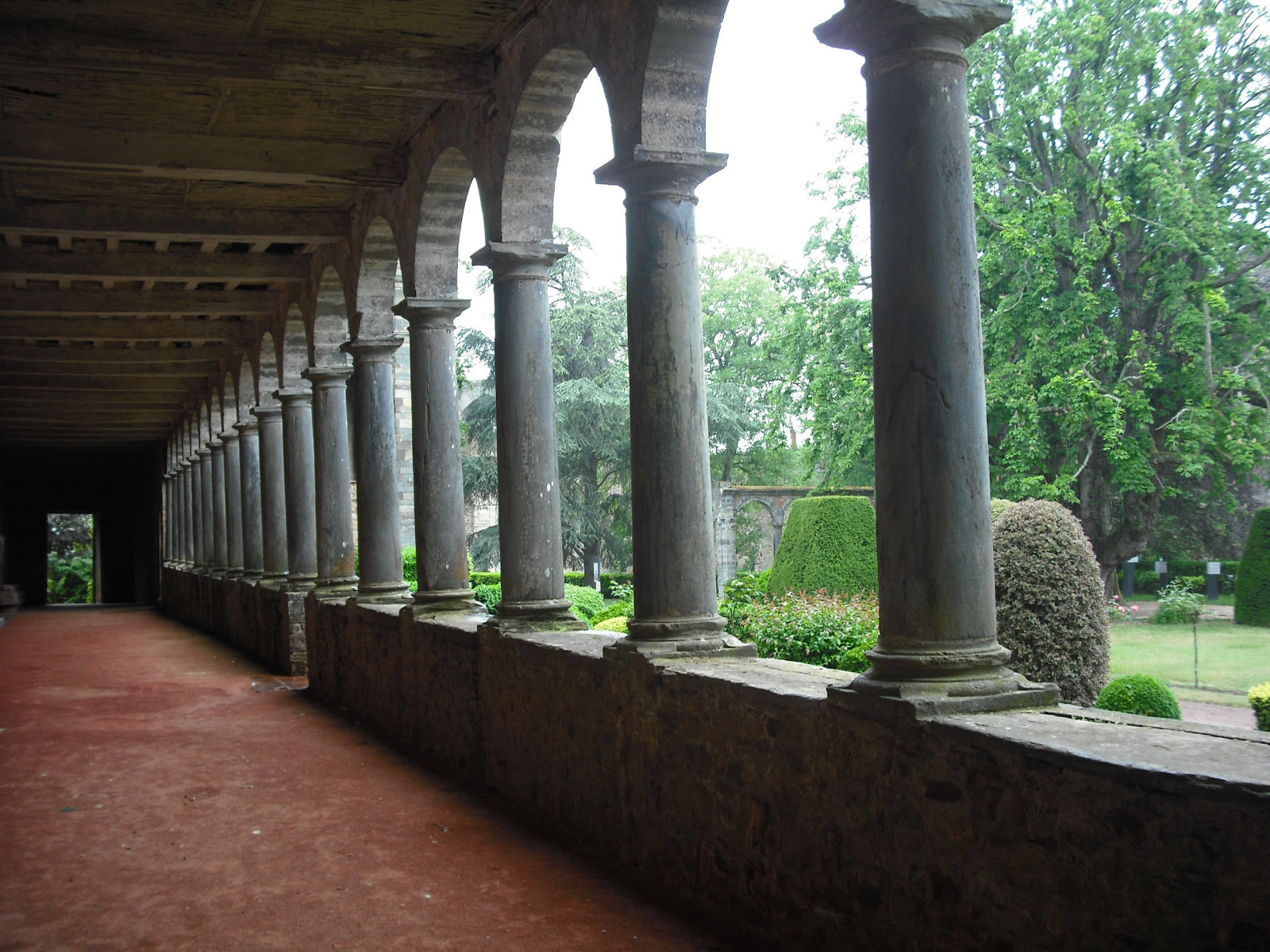
The Renaissance gallery.

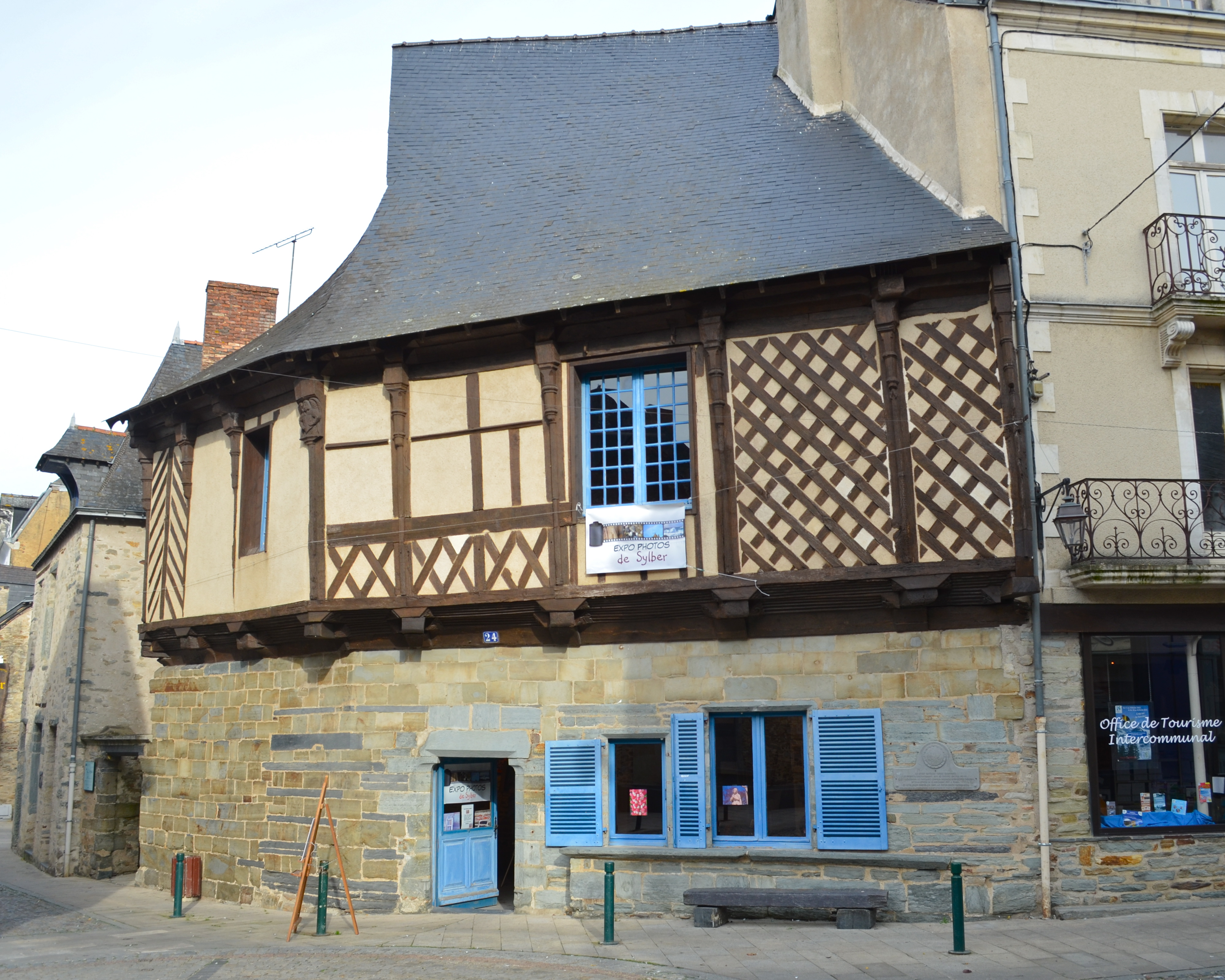
The Maison de l'Ange.

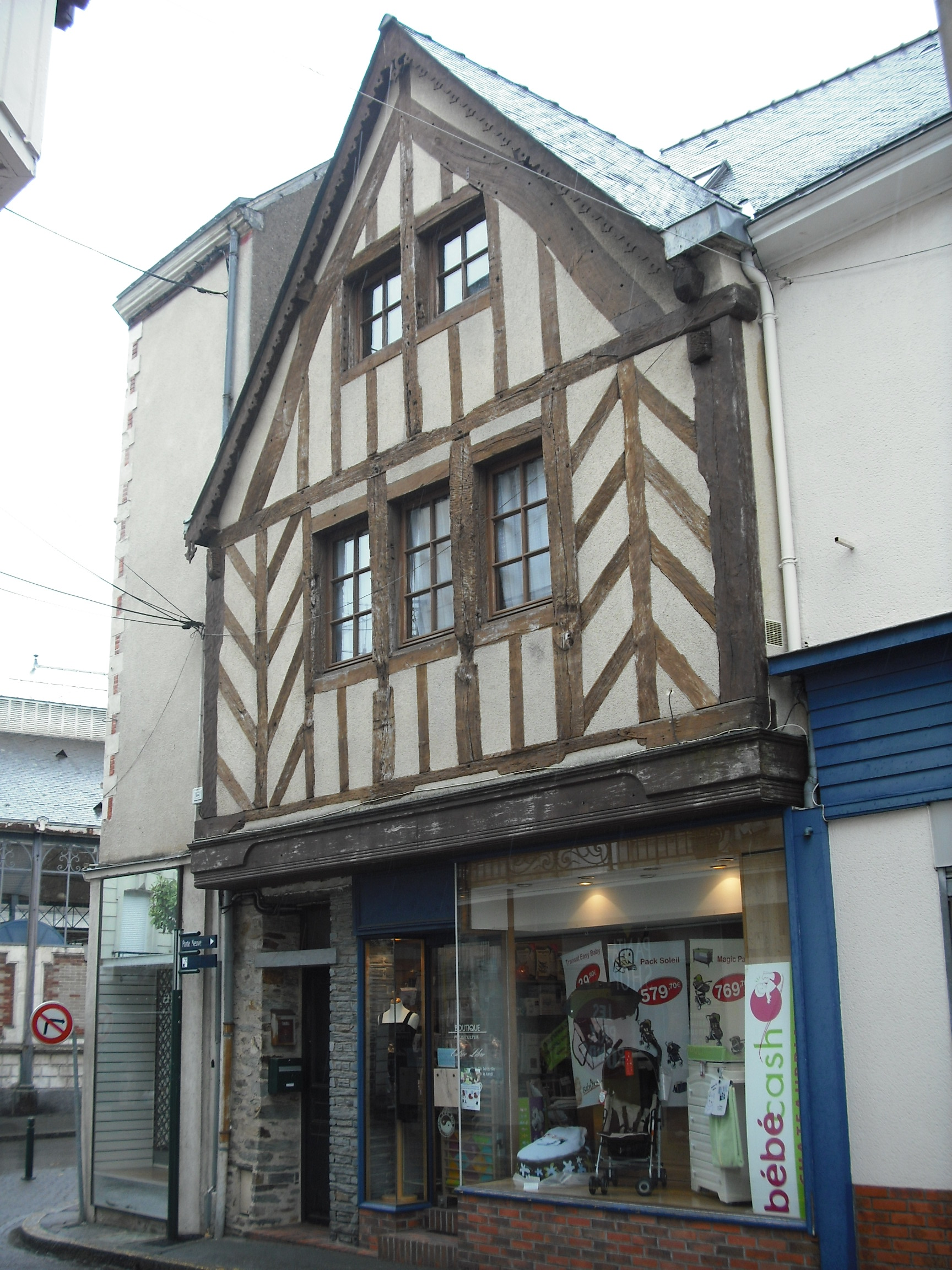
Half-timbered house.

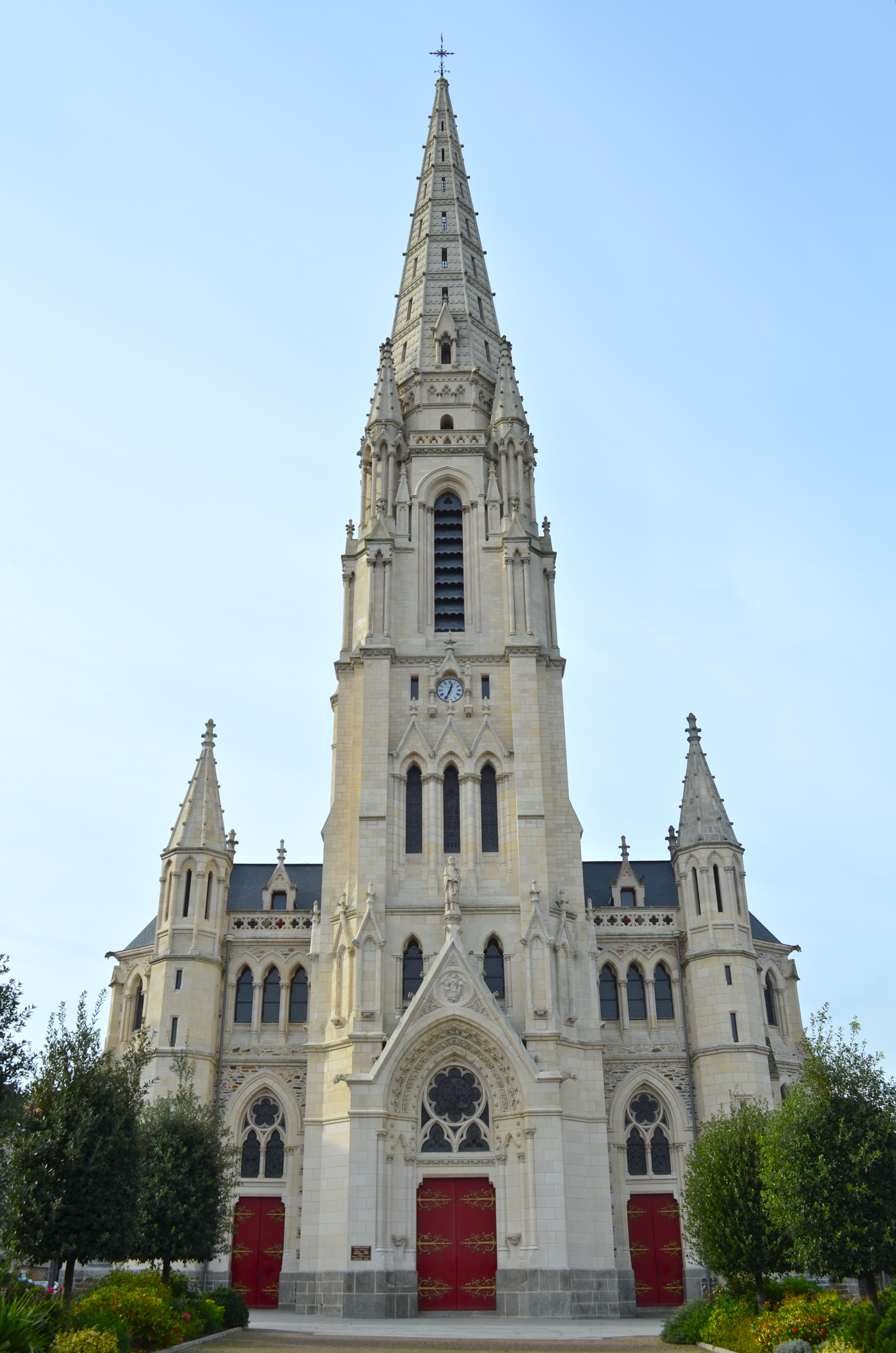
Saint-Nicolas church.

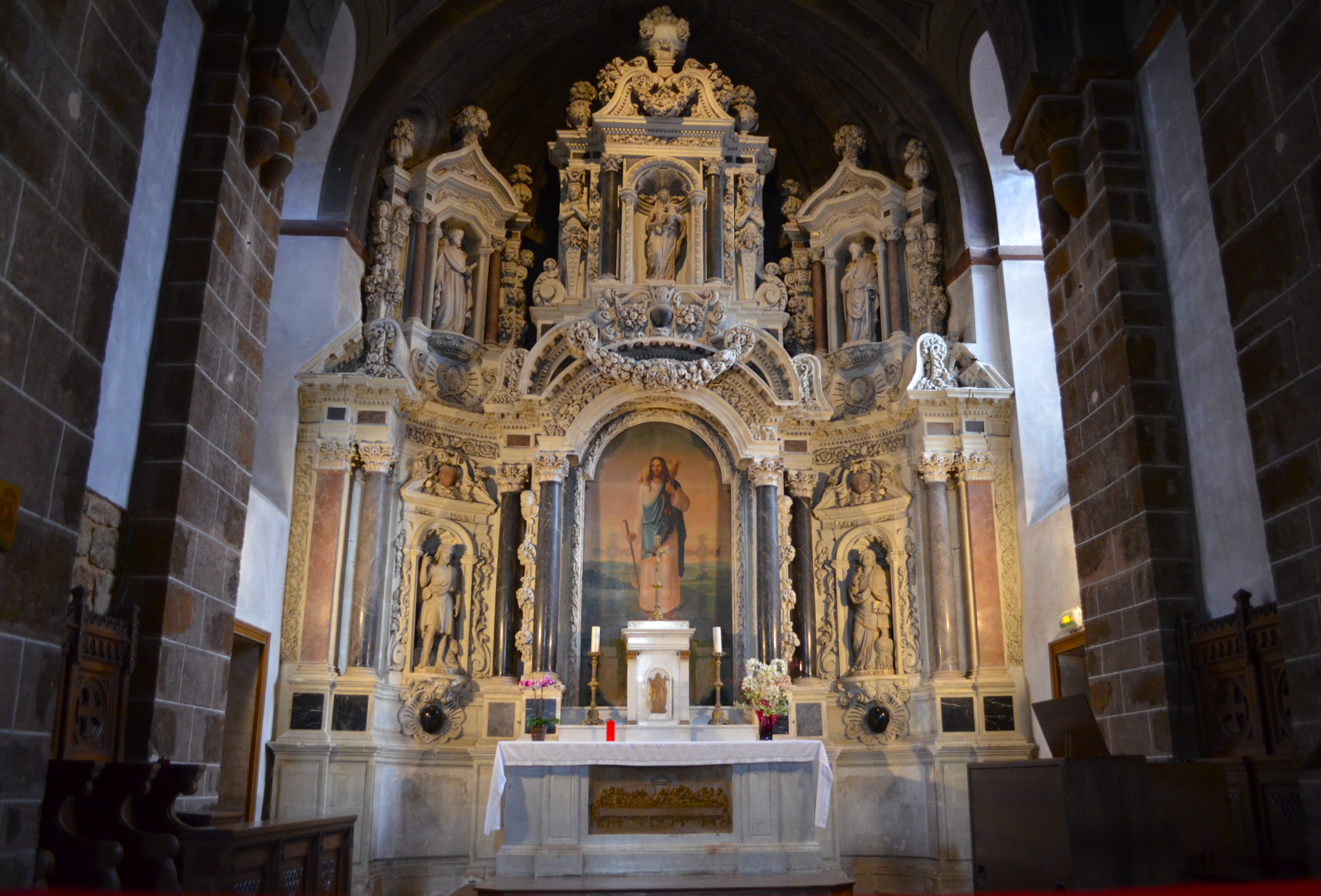
A baroque altar in Saint-Jean-de-Béré church.

=== Performing arts ===
The Théâtre de Verre ("glass theatre") is the main venue for concerts and theatre. Châteaubriant also has a four-screen cinema and a school for music, dance and drama ().

The town has a Celtic circle and a bagad (Breton traditional band).

=== Local legends ===
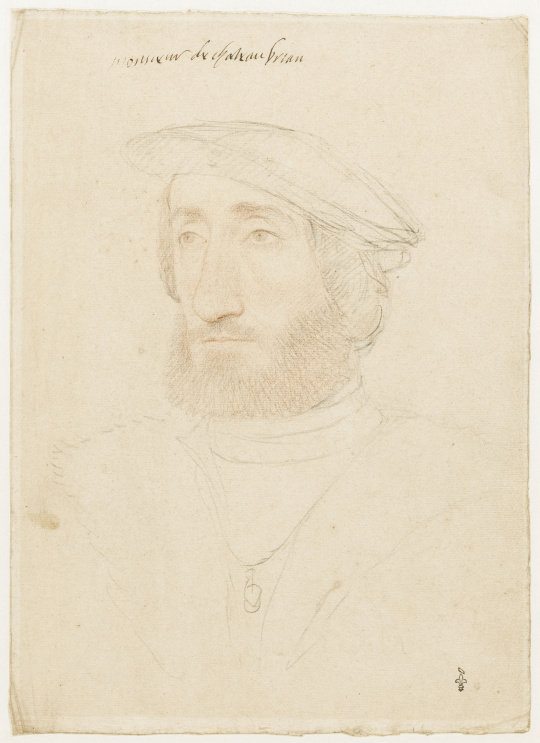
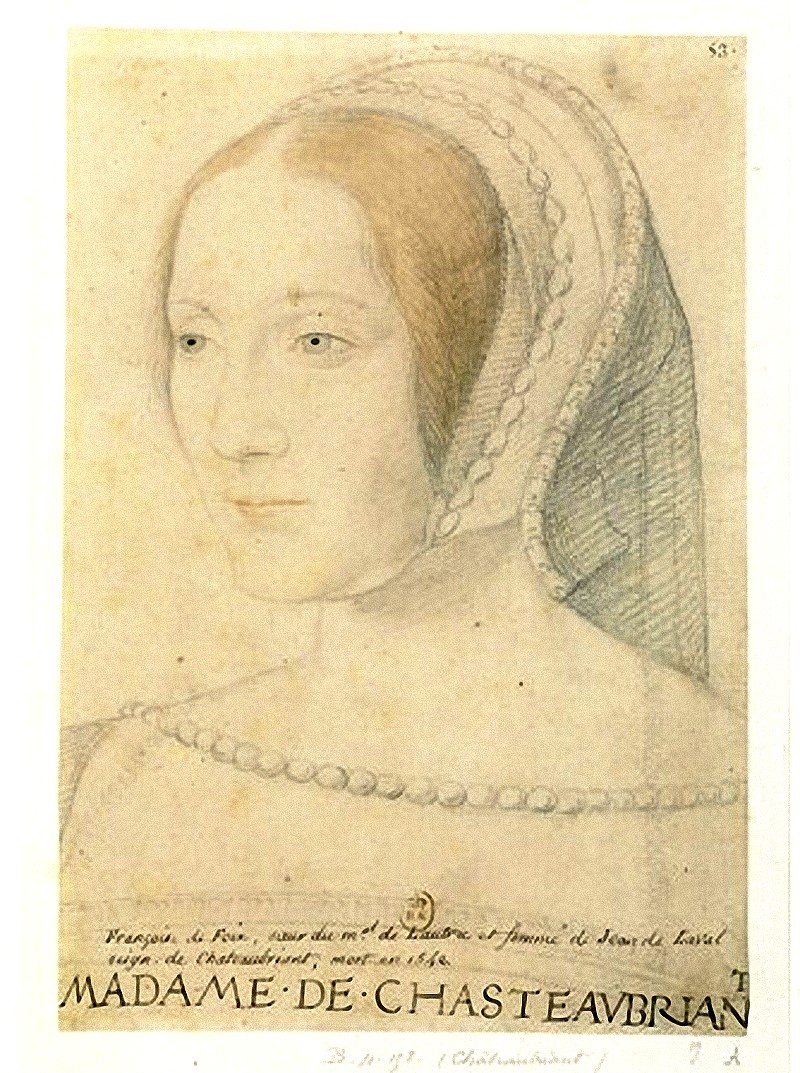
Jean de Laval and his wife Françoise de Foix

Several legends are linked with Châteaubriant. The most famous one is the Bête de Béré ("Béré beast"), known in the whole Pays de la Mée. According to the legend, a beast, looking like a wolf, a pig or a big cat, prowls every night in the Béré suburb to protect a young maid who has been locked for centuries under the priory.

Another legend is built around Jean de Laval and his wife Françoise de Foix, mistress of Francis I of France, who died in 1537 in the castle. At that time, a rumour said that she was killed by her jealous husband, who did not approve of her relationship with the King. Since then, a ghostly procession would walk in the castle at the death anniversary, every 16 October at midnight.

== Twin cities ==
Châteaubriant is twinned with:

- Radevormwald, Germany, since 1981
- (Republic of Ireland) Athlone, Ireland, since 1985
- Brabova, Romania, since 1990
- Tigzirt, Algeria (in process).

== See also ==
- Communes of the Loire-Atlantique department
- Edict of Châteaubriant
- Château de Châteaubriant
