= Pays de la Mée =

Coordinates: 47°42′N 1°24′W

Location of the Pays de la Mée on the eastern border of the Duchy of Brittany.

Modern flag of the Pays de la Mée.

The Pays de la Mée (French pronunciation: [pei də la me], lit. 'Land de la Mée' or 'Land de the Mée'; Breton: Bro-Vez; Gallo: Paeyi de la Mée) is a historical region of Brittany (now France) which was part of the Duchy of Brittany before the French Revolution. It was then split between Loire-Atlantique and Ille-et-Vilaine department. Its capital is Châteaubriant. The dialect traditionally spoken in the Pays de la Mée is Gallo, which is a Romance language, as opposed to the Celtic language of Breton.

== Geography ==
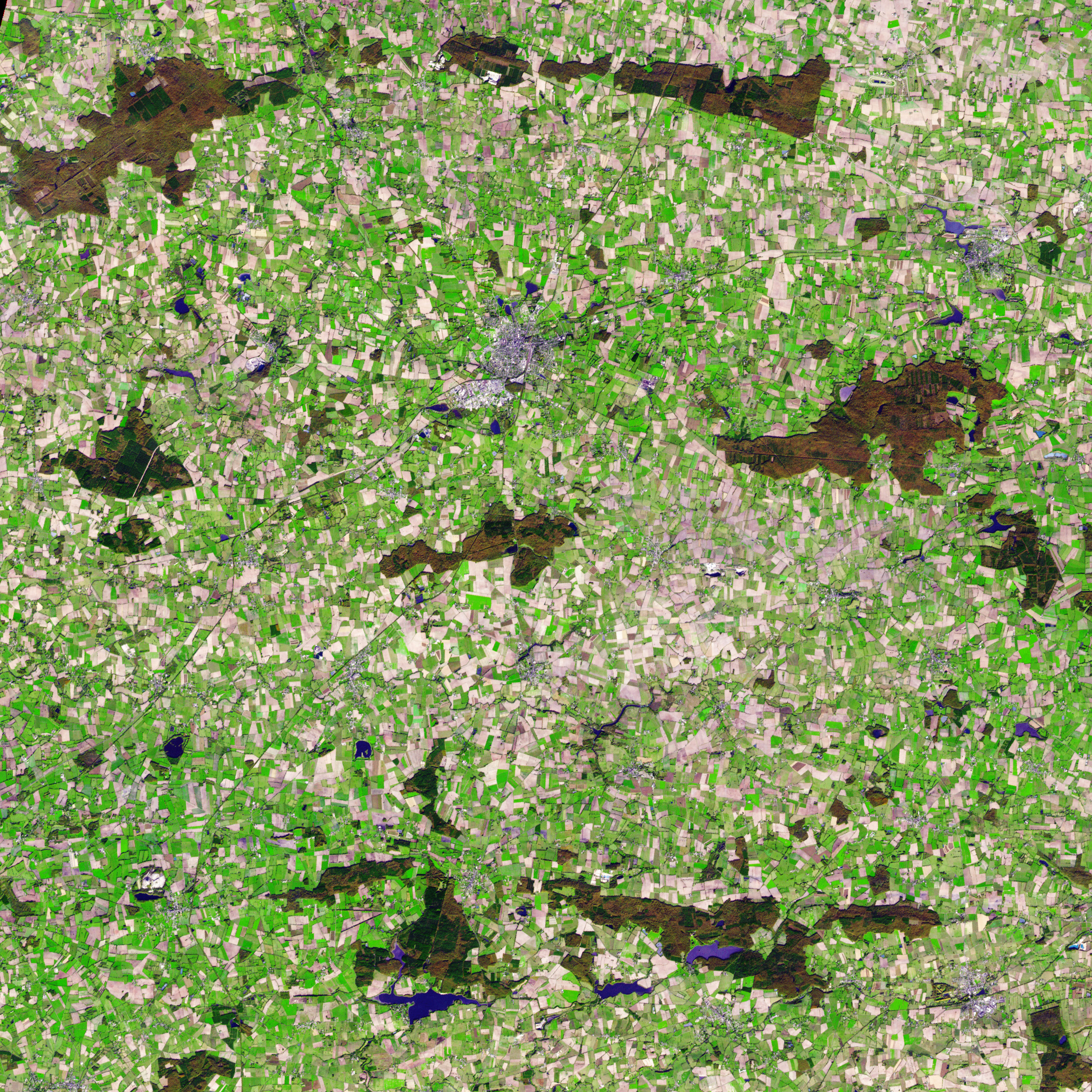
Areal view of the Pays de la Mée, with fields, forests and pounds

The area lies on the eastern border of Brittany, facing Anjou (now Maine-et-Loire). Most of the territory is part of Loire-Atlantique, but several villages in Ille-et-Vilaine are usually included in the Pays de la Mée. Moreover, its limits are not very clear; for example, Candé, a small town in Anjou, was named Candé-en-la-Mée during the Middle Ages.

The landscape of the Pays de la Mée is hilly because it is on the eastern side of the Armorican Massif. The ground is mostly made of schist and contains small amounts of iron ore, which was particularly exploited during the 19th century. The area is also crossed by several small rivers, such as the Don, and watermills used to be numerous. The area is mainly devoted to agriculture, especially cattle breeding.

== History ==
Pays de la Mée, literally translated to Land of la Mée, means "pays du milieu" ("middle-country") in French. The area is located between Angers, Nantes, and Rennes. Around the 10th century, it was a buffer zone when the counts of each city were fighting. It also has an old mercantile tradition—the fair at Châteaubriant was founded in 1049. The Pays de la Mée is first mentioned in 1055. It disappeared as an administrative unit around 1270, when the counties of Nantes and Rennes merged into one single state.

The name "Pays de la Mée" saw a revival during the 1970s, and several institutions bear this name, such as a theatre. Its limits also corresponds to the Pays de Châteaubriant, a group of 33 communes.

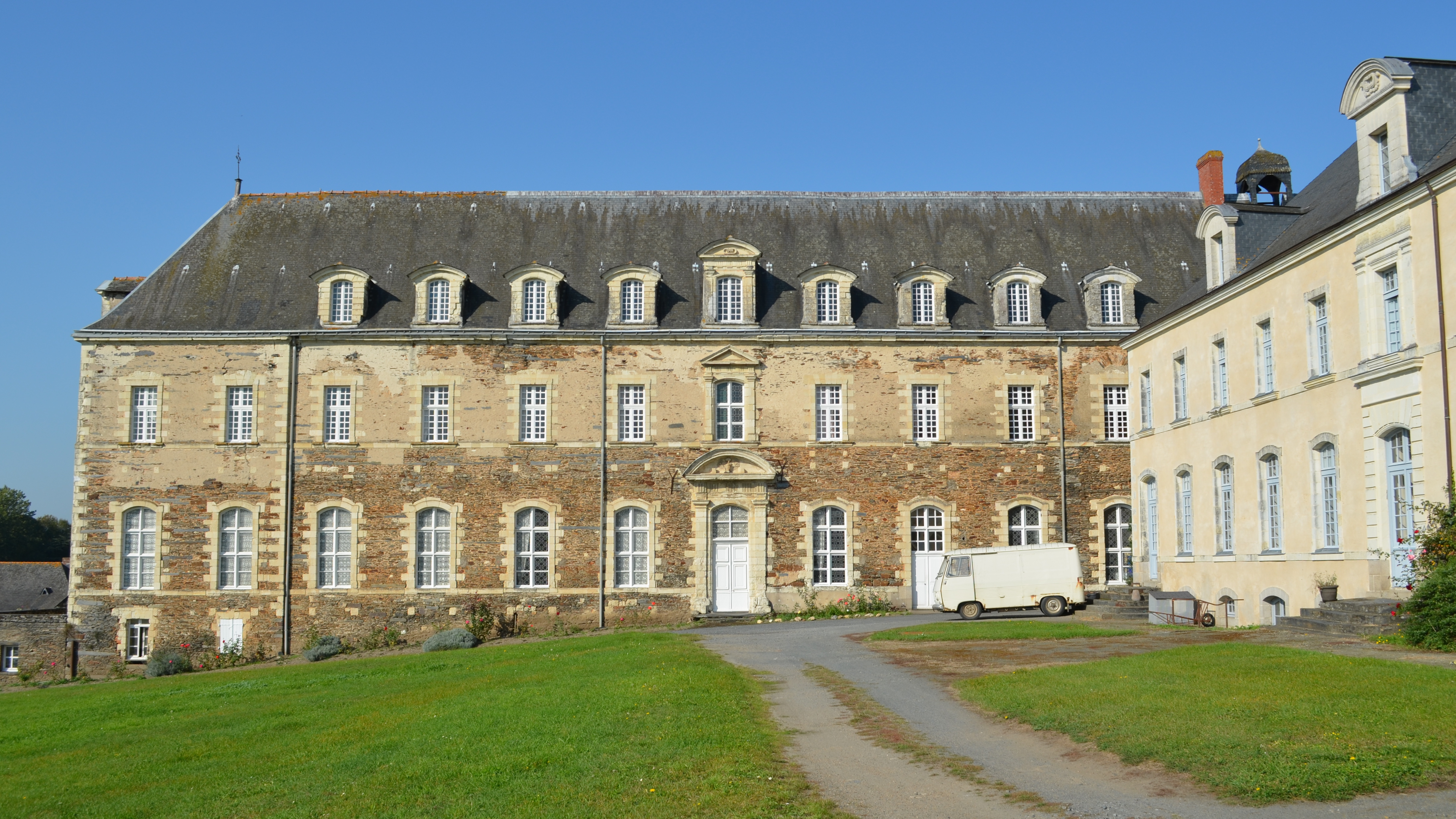
The Abbaye de Melleray.

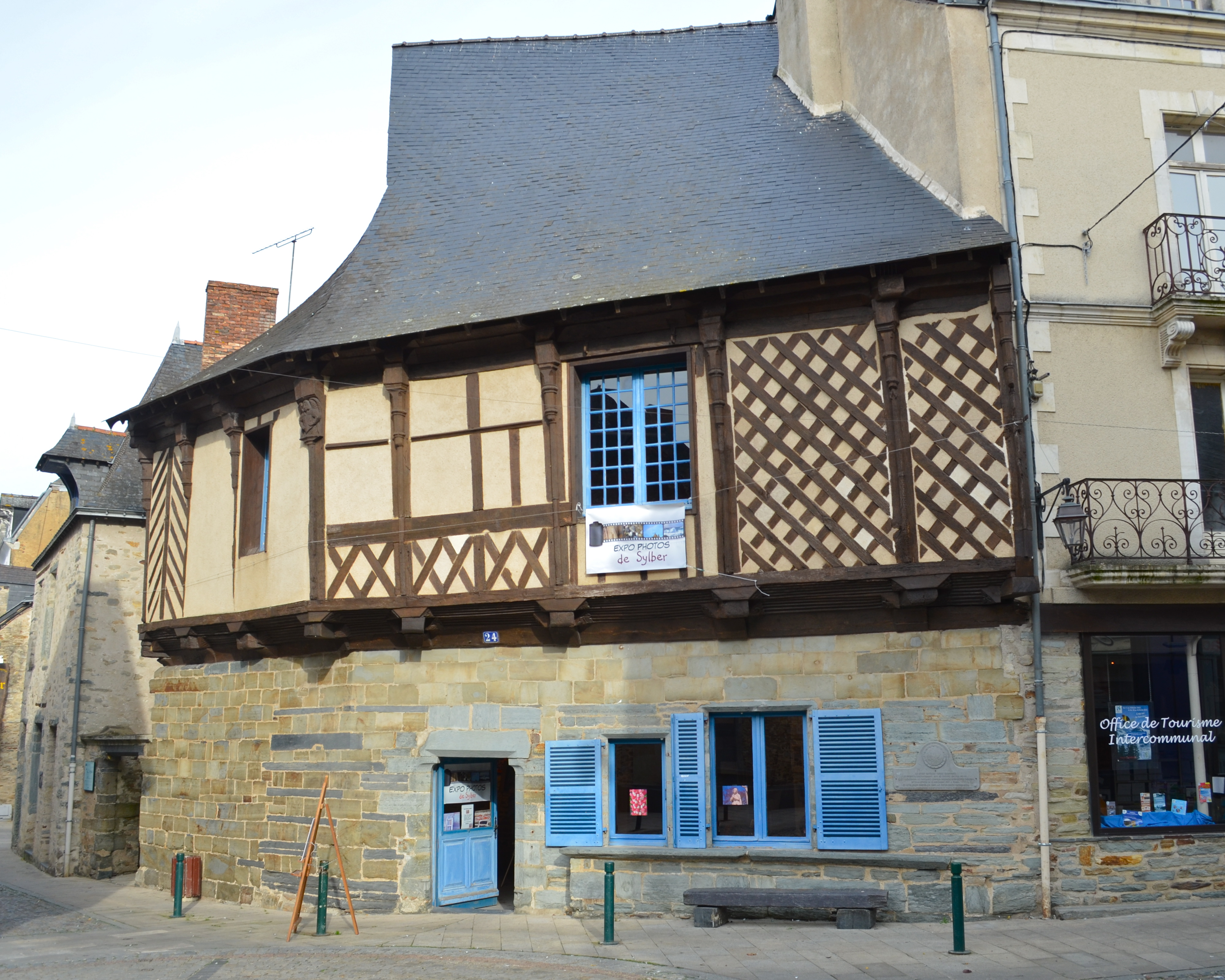
Half-timbered house, Châteaubriant.

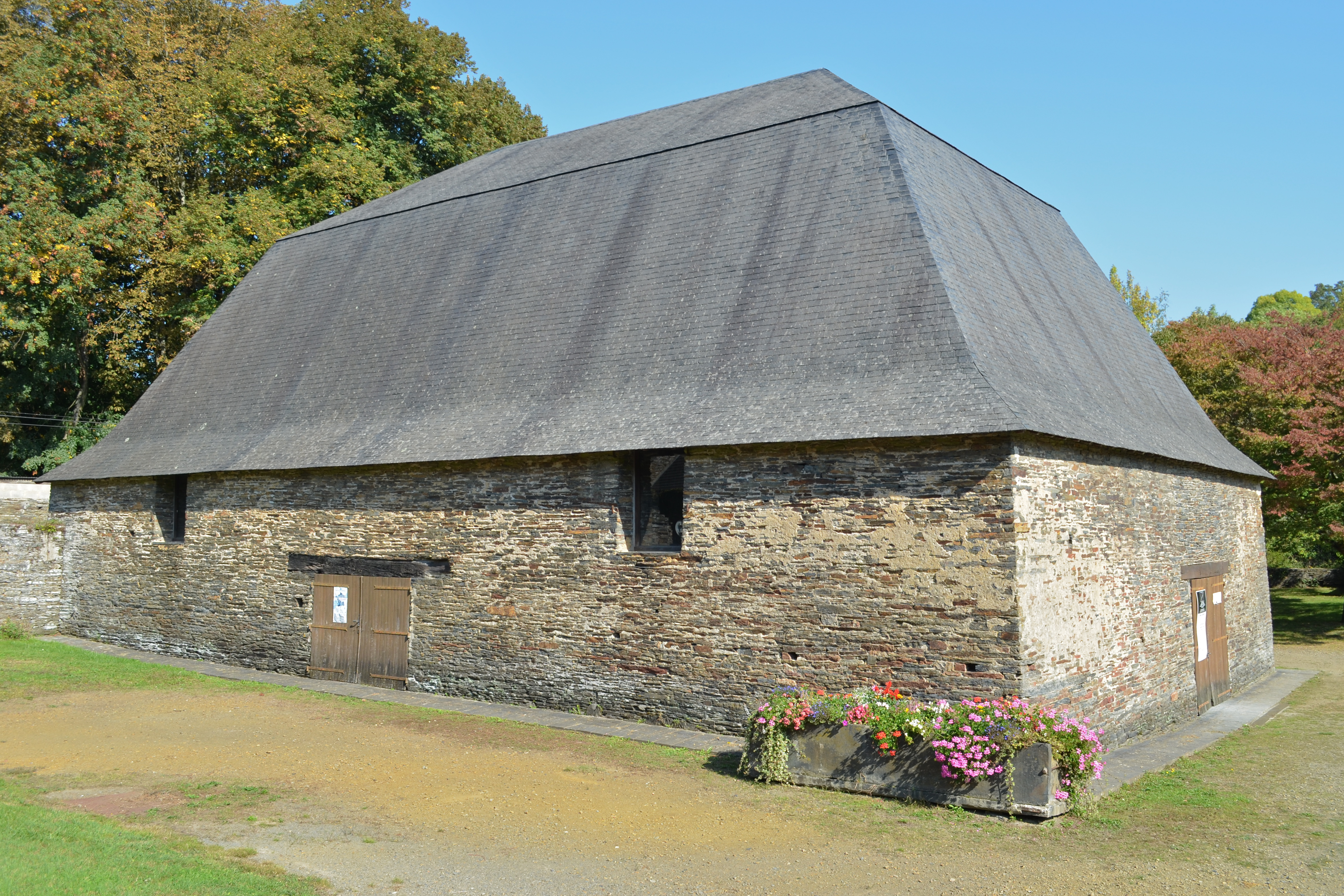
Old forge in Moisdon-la-Rivière.

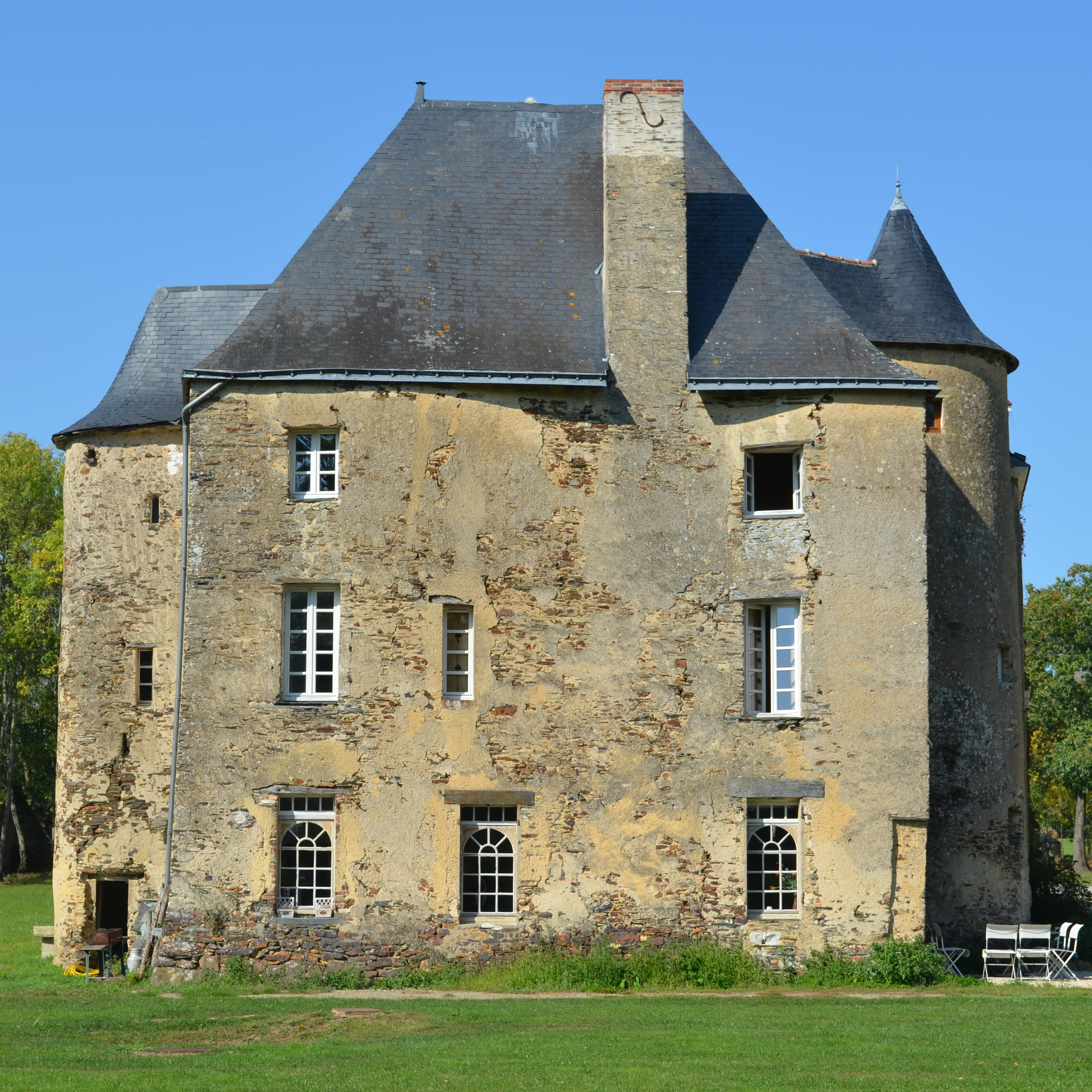
A manor in Abbaretz.

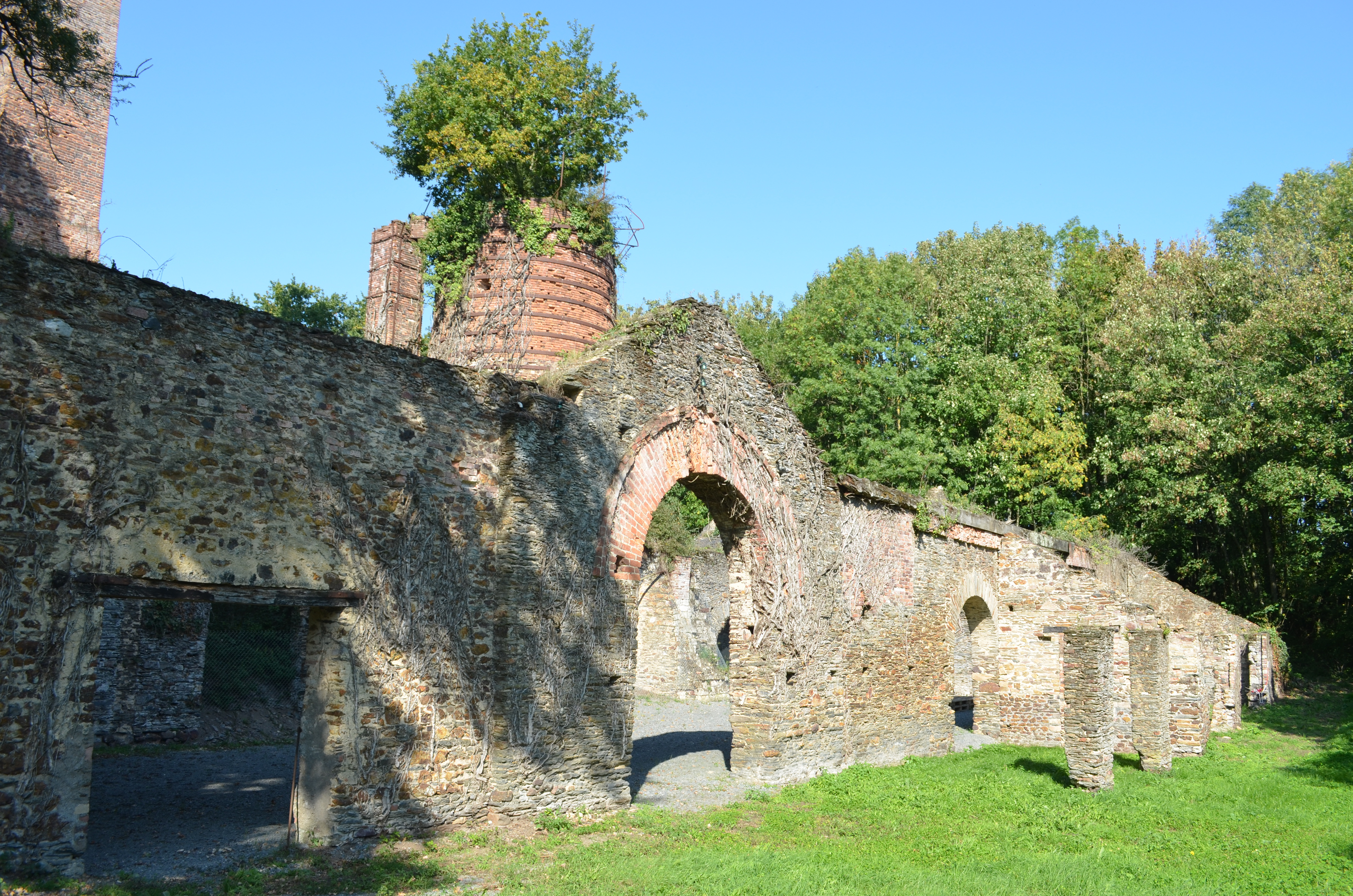
Ruins of a forge in Abbaretz.
