= Saint-Aubin-des-Châteaux =

- Commune
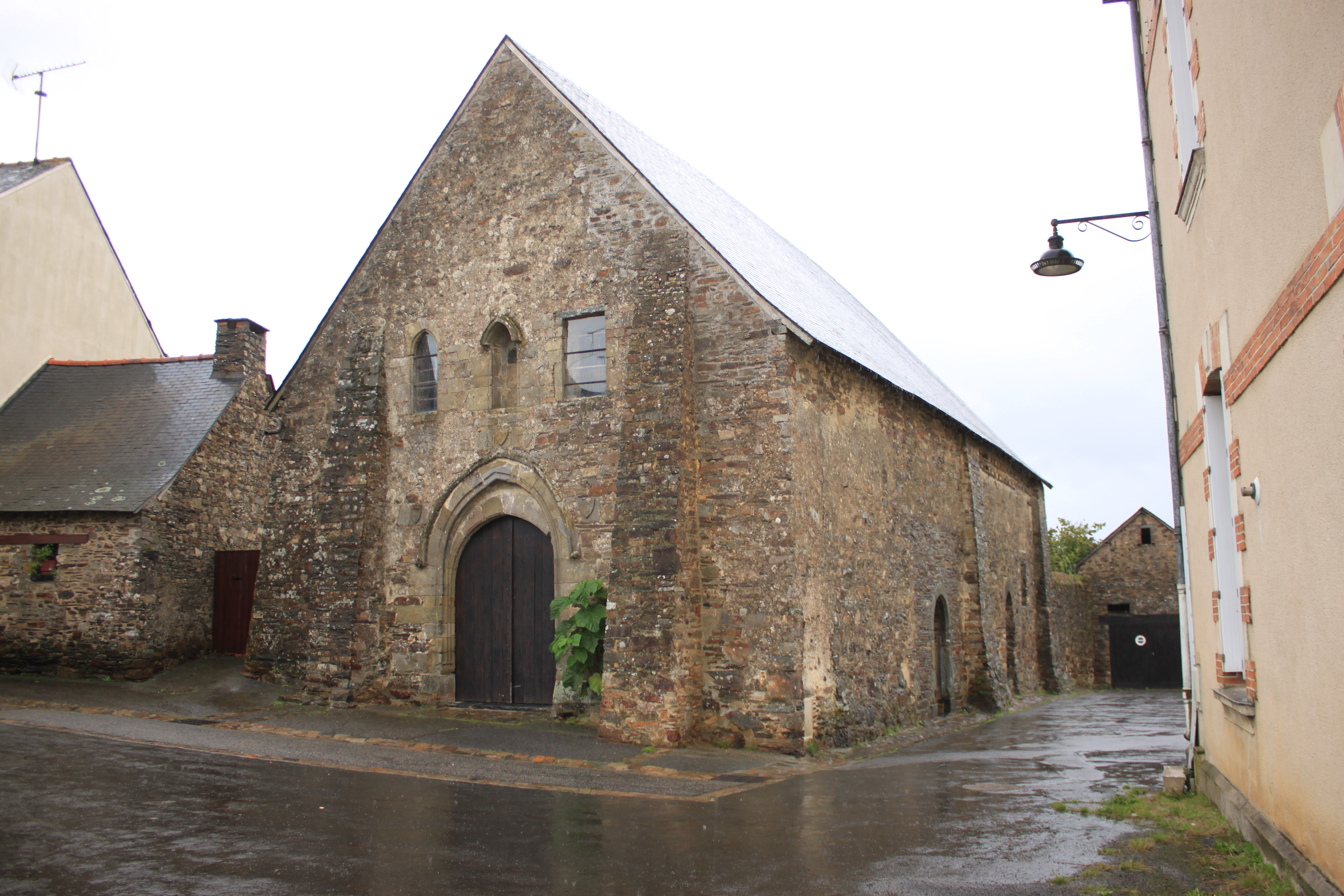
- Chapel of the Templars

- Coat of arms
- Location of Saint-Aubin-des-Châteaux
- Location within France Location within Pays de la Loire
- Coordinates: 47°43′15″N 1°29′06″W
- Country: France
- Region: Pays de la Loire
- Department: Loire-Atlantique
- Arrondissement: Châteaubriant-Ancenis
- Canton: Châteaubriant
- Intercommunality: Châteaubriant-Derval

Government
  - Mayor (2020–2026): Daniel Rabu
- Area^{1}: 47.56 km^{2} (18.36 sq mi)
- Elevation: 65 m (213 ft)
- Highest elevation: 92 m (302 ft)
- Lowest elevation: 32 m (105 ft)
- Population (2023): 1,744
  - Density: 36.67/km^{2} (94.97/sq mi)
- Time zone: UTC+01:00 (CET)
  - Summer (DST): UTC+02:00 (CEST)
- INSEE/Postal code: 44153 /44110
- ^{1} French Land Register data, which excludes lakes, ponds, glaciers > 1 km^{2} (0.386 sq mi or 247 acres) and river estuaries.

Saint-Aubin-des-Châteaux (French pronunciation: [sɛ̃.t‿obɛ̃ de ʃato]; Breton: Sant-Albin-ar-C'hestell) is a commune in the Loire-Atlantique department in western France.

== Geography ==
The village is located in the northwestern part of the commune on the right bank of the river Chère, which flows southwest through the commune.

== Population ==
Historical population
Year	Pop.	±% p.a.
1968	1,472	—
1975	1,387	−0.85%
1982	1,351	−0.37%
1990	1,346	−0.05%
1999	1,312	−0.28%
2007	1,502	+1.70%
2012	1,649	+1.88%
2017	1,795	+1.71%
2023	1,744	−0.48%
Source: INSEE

== See also ==
- Communes of the Loire-Atlantique department
