= Abbaretz =

Abbaretz Abarèt (Gallo) Abarrez (Breton)
- Commune
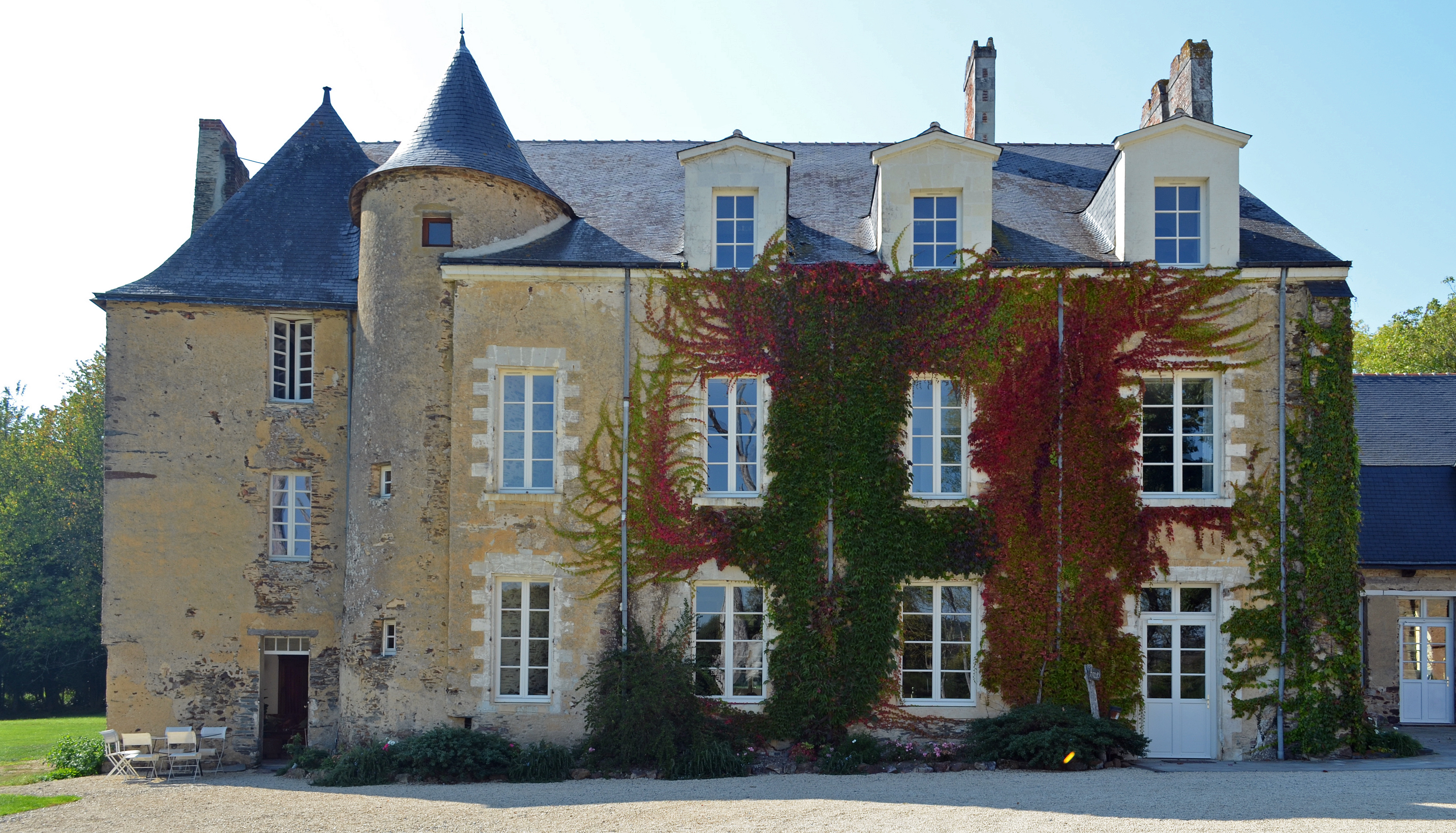
- Le Manoir de la Jahotiere Hotel

- Coat of arms
- Location of Abbaretz
- Location within France Location within Pays de la Loire
- Coordinates: 47°33′12″N 1°31′50″W
- Country: France
- Region: Pays de la Loire
- Department: Loire-Atlantique
- Arrondissement: Châteaubriant-Ancenis
- Canton: Guémené-Penfao
- Intercommunality: Nozay

Government
  - Mayor (2023–2026): Simone Buron
- Area^{1}: 61.76 km^{2} (23.85 sq mi)
- Highest elevation: 91 m (299 ft)
- Lowest elevation: 26 m (85 ft)
- Population (2023): 2,073
  - Density: 33.57/km^{2} (86.93/sq mi)
- Demonym(s): Abbarois, Abbaroises
- Time zone: UTC+01:00 (CET)
  - Summer (DST): UTC+02:00 (CEST)
- INSEE/Postal code: 44001 /44170
- ^{1} French Land Register data, which excludes lakes, ponds, glaciers > 1 km^{2} (0.386 sq mi or 247 acres) and river estuaries.

Abbaretz (French pronunciation: [abaʁɛ]; Gallo: Abarèt, Breton: Abarrez) is a commune in the Loire-Atlantique department in the Pays de la Loire region of western France.

== Geography ==
Abbaretz is located 20 km south-west of Châteaubriant and 20 km north-east of Blain. Access to the commune is by the D2 road from Nozay in the west passing through the village and continuing east to La Meilleraye-de-Bretagne. The D1 road comes from Treffieux in the north passing through the village and continuing south. The D35 road comes from Issé in the north-east passing through the village and continuing south-west to Puceul. The D24 road branches from the D1 just south of the village and goes south-east to Joué-sur-Erdre. The D69 road from Issé to Nort-sur-Erdre passes through the east of the commune. Apart from the village there are also the hamlets of:

- Les Breils-Clement
- La Chauvelaie
- La Chauvelais
- Le Chene Trouy
- Coulouine
- La Gleminiere
- La Godardais
- La Hazardiere
- Le Houx
- Le Maffay
- La Placiere
- La Rainais
- La Riviere
- Rozay
- Villeneuve

=== Etymology ===
Abbaretz has been previously known by the following names:

- Abbaretiacum (1123)
- Abbaret (1230)
- Abbarez (1270 and 1278)
- Abbarrez (1341)
- Abbaretz (1456)
- Abbaret (1489)
- La Baretz (1539)
- Abbareium (1650)
- Abbaretz (today).

The name Abbaretz originates from the Gallo language which is the language of Upper Brittany: Abarèt in Gallo (as per ELG)

== History ==
Until the 8th century the parish of Abbaretiacum had its own Lord Bishop under the Bishops of Nantes. Following the invasion of Normandy and civil wars in Brittany in the 11th and 12th centuries Abbaretz ceased to be a feudal state. During the 10th century the lords of Chateaubriand took effective possession of the territory of Abbaretz: to enter Abbaretz was a privilege they gave to one of their younger sons, known by the name of Le Boeuf who was First Lord of Nozay and Issé. In 1123, however, the Duke Conan confirmed the church of Nantes as the owner of the church at Abbaretz.

In June 1230 Brient Le Boeuf, called "The Old Man", Lord of Issé, donated to the Cistercian Abbey of Notre Dame de Melleray, for the salvation of his soul, some land he owned at Abbaretz. The monks of this monastery built a barn and a chapel dedicated to St. Margaret. At the same time, Geoffroy de Trent abandoned his portion of Melleray Abbey and two-thirds of all the tithes of the land of the Abbaretz forest ("decimas terre sue de foresta de Abbaret").

In 1242, Guégon Le Gruc and his wife Agathe of Trent (daughter of Olivier and niece of Geoffroy of Trent) confirmed this pious donation. The parishioners of Abbaretz tried to oppose the increase in their tithes by the monks at Melleray. From the documents in the process, it can be seen that the area called the Forest of Abbaretz was inhabited in 1235 by Daniel and Bernard de Rozé, Guy Lague, Robin Daniel, Guillaume Robin, Riwallon Le Duc, Guillaume Robert, Pierre Constanz, Geffroy Grimaut, Guillaume Raffrey, and Judicaël Troynel who were all vassals of Geoffroy Trent.

When the diocese of Nantes was divided into archdeaconries and deaneries, the parish of Abbaretz was included in the deanery of Chateaubriand, a member of the archdeaconry of Mee.

The fiefs component of the Lordship of Abbaretz was composed of several parts:

- the income from Nozay (Note: (fiefs of Fief-Racaud or Fief-Rouzay, la Hardière, la Gueffraye, la Houssaye, la Rouaudière, les Hauts-Chemins, Galhard, la Pierre, la Chaussee, la Rabardière, Montbaron, Coulouine, la Guilminière, la Bonnaudière, les Rivières, Maffay, la Belaudaye, la Chevrollière, la Pommeraye, la Mollière, la Vennerie, la Placière, la Pourprise, Guillote-Ouairie, la Fouaye, la Forest, Pillet-Morel, Bouzay, Bourdon, Chesne-Trouit, la Chesnaye, la Raimbaudière, la Rabaudière, Rebuffé, Tournel de Hameline, Helland, le bourg d'Abbaretz, etc.))
- the income from Issé (Note: (fiefs de la Minière, du Houx, de la Trahannière, de la Herminière et de la Torraye, ...))
- the income from Vioreau (Note: (fiefs de la Liraye, d'Estival et de la Bouchetière, ...))
- the barony of Derval
- The Melleray Abbey (Note: (the Barn Abbaretz, the farms of Sainte-Marguerite and Féchetaye the Guichardaye the Rouaudière the Herminière ...))

The headquarters of the most important Lordship was located at the Chateau de La Riviere which originally belongs to the Briant (or Brient) family and then passed into the hands of the lords of Chateaubriant, then the House of Montmorency, and then the Prince of Condé.

== Heraldry ==
Arms of Abbaretz	The ermine evokes the emblem of Brittany, recalling past inclusion of the town with the Duchy of Brittany. The arms were designed by Mr. Le Rossignol and have been in use since 1983. Blazon: Gules, a cross sable, cantoned with: the first gules a pyramid argent; the second, gules an Ox's head cabossed in sable; the third, gules a garb of or; the fourth, of ermine, overall an inescutcheon argent with a crescent in gules and three crampons, 2 and 1, the senestre turned.

== Administration ==
List of Successive Mayors of Abbaretz

From	To	Name
1843		René Suraud
1870	1871	François Marchand
1871	1891	Julien Bauchene
1891	1904	Pierre Herbert
1904	1937	Yvonnic Guillotin
1937	1971	Jean Brehier
1971	1989	Maurice Cadot
1989	2008	Robert Bommé
2008	2023	Jean-Pierre Possoz
2023	Current	Simone Buron

== Population ==
The inhabitants of the commune are known as Abbarois or Abbaroises in French.

Historical population

Year	Pop.	±% p.a.
1793	1,135	—
1800	829	−4.39%
1806	1,266	+7.31%
1821	1,505	+1.16%
1831	1,671	+1.05%
1836	1,729	+0.68%
1841	1,814	+0.96%
1846	2,274	+4.62%
1851	2,363	+0.77%
1856	2,454	+0.76%
1861	2,493	+0.32%
1866	2,623	+1.02%
1872	2,694	+0.45%
1876	2,727	+0.30%
1881	2,693	−0.25%
1886	2,706	+0.10%
1891	2,775	+0.50%
1896	2,803	+0.20%
1901	2,732	−0.51%

Year	Pop.	±% p.a.
1906	2,730	−0.01%
1911	2,763	+0.24%
1921	2,523	−0.90%
1926	2,392	−1.06%
1931	2,345	−0.40%
1936	2,277	−0.59%
1946	2,087	−0.87%
1954	2,183	+0.56%
1962	2,020	−0.97%
1968	2,007	−0.11%
1975	1,828	−1.33%
1982	1,647	−1.48%
1990	1,572	−0.58%
1999	1,509	−0.45%
2007	1,782	+2.10%
2012	1,956	+1.88%
2017	2,088	+1.31%
2023	2,073	−0.12%

Source: EHESS (1793-1999) and INSEE

== Languages ==
French and the local language of Gallo are spoken in the area. The Gallo language is in danger of extinction according to a study by Serge Jouin in his thesis: "The Gallo speech of Abbaretz and elsewhere ...", published in two volumes in 1982 and 1984. Abbaretz is also a point of survey for the linguistic atlas (ALBRAM) by Messrs. Guillaume and Chauveau.

== Sights ==
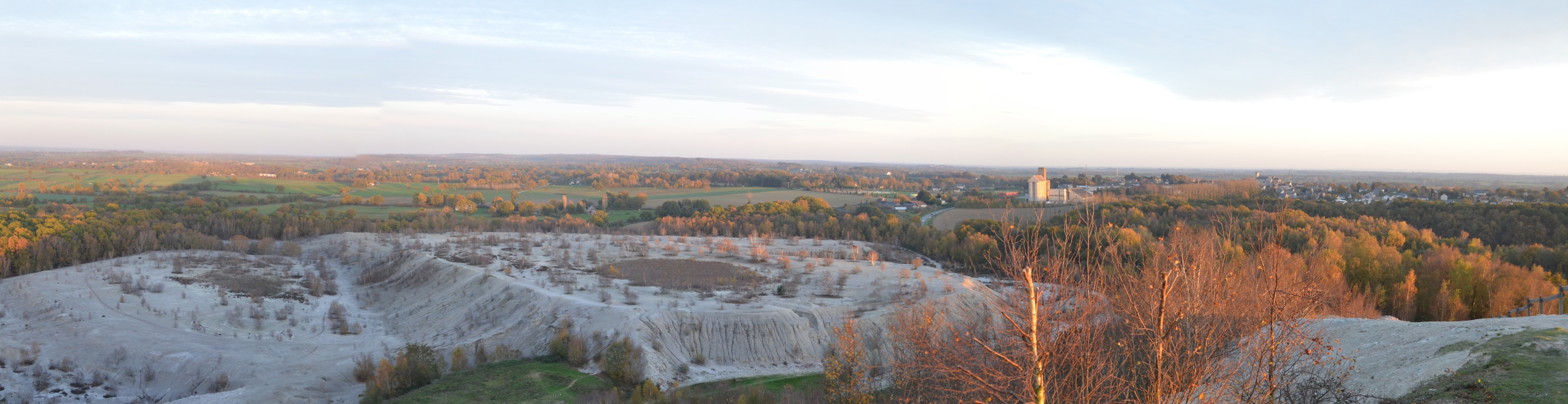
View of Abbaretz from the top of the slag heap.

- Site of the tin mine. The area was known for its tin production into the 1960s but it has now been converted to recreational purposes.
  - The lake that was produced from tin extraction has an area of 15 hectares and is used for water skiing.
  - The slag heap is 121 metres high (which is 5 metres higher than the highest hill in the department - Breteche hill) provides a scenic view with hiking and para-sailing opportunities.
- Chestnut tree of the Nonneries: this is a classified tree 800 years old.
- Old Forges of the Jahotière which has now been converted into a hotel and function centre.
- The parish Church of Saint-Pierre has a Chalice which is registered as an historical object.
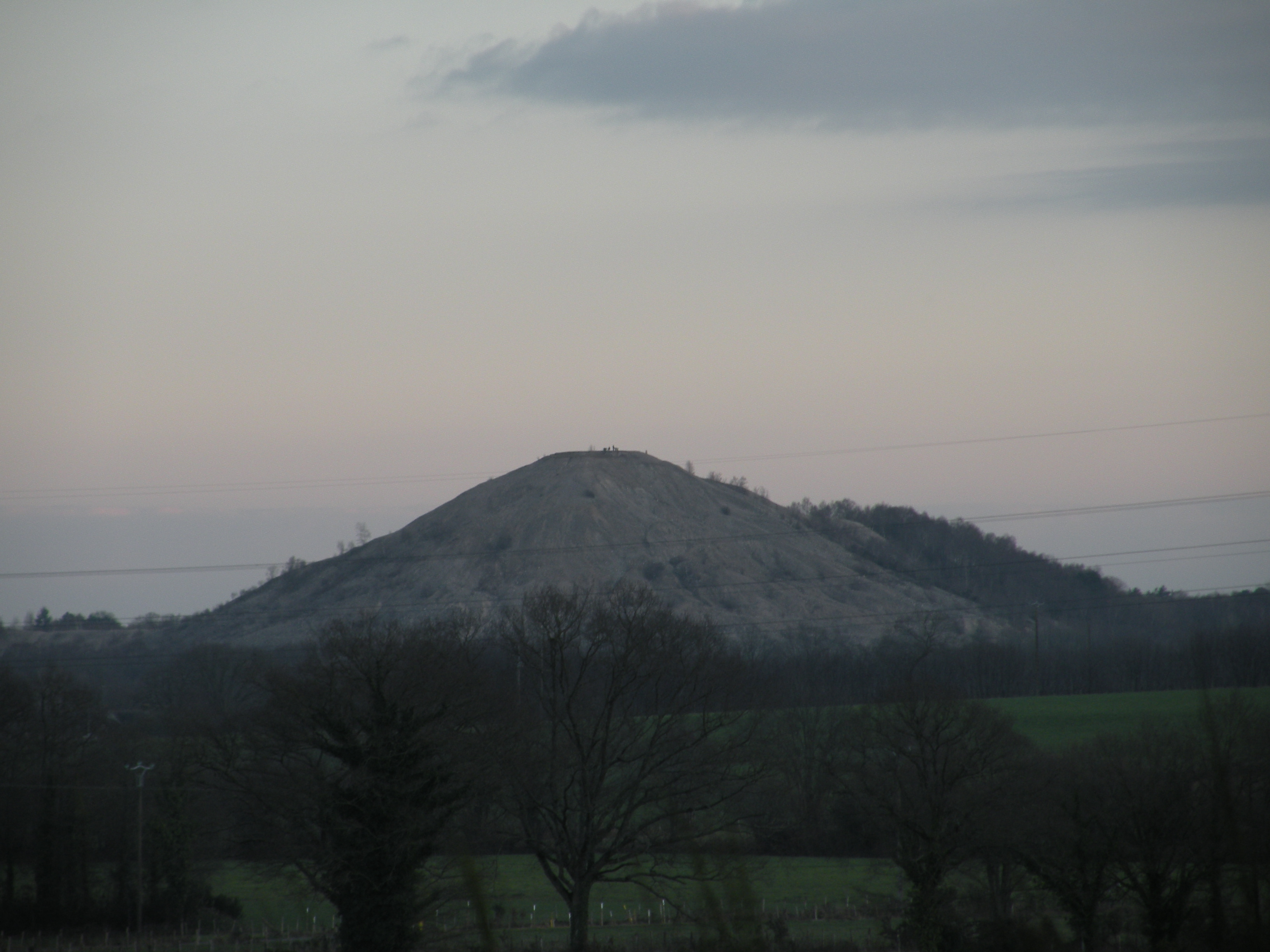
The slag heap of the old tin mine.

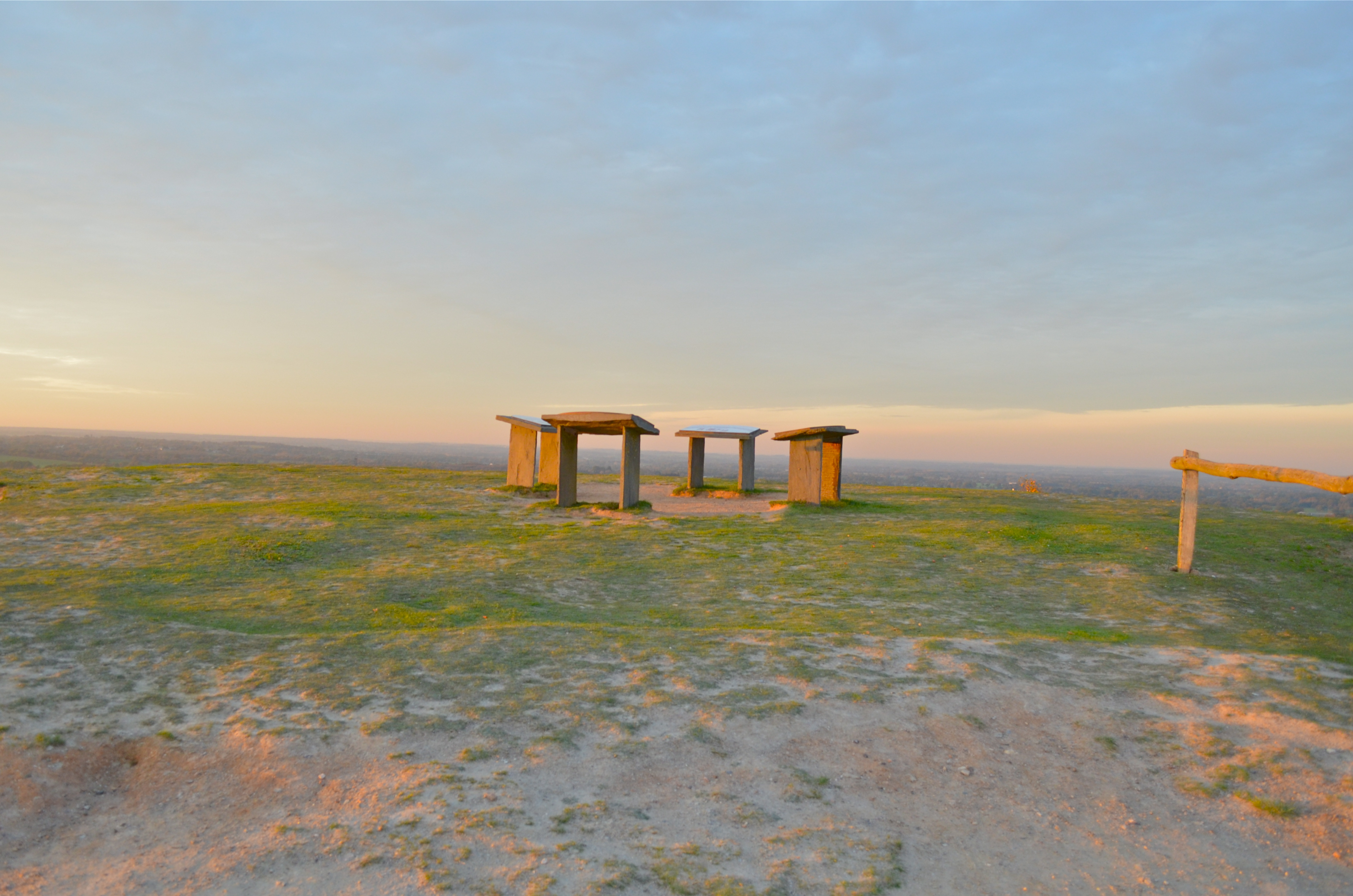
The top of the slag heap.

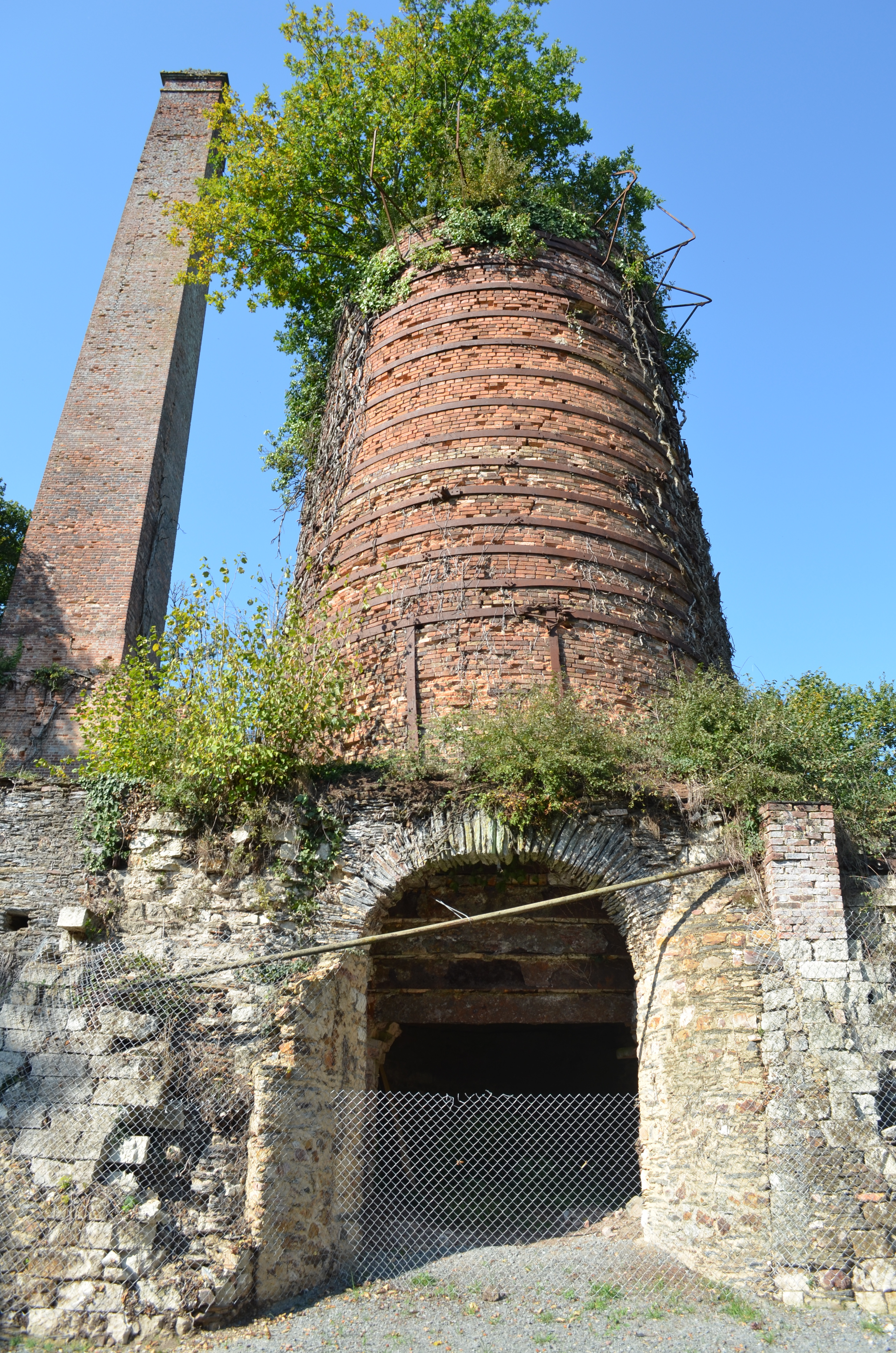
Ruins of the old forge.

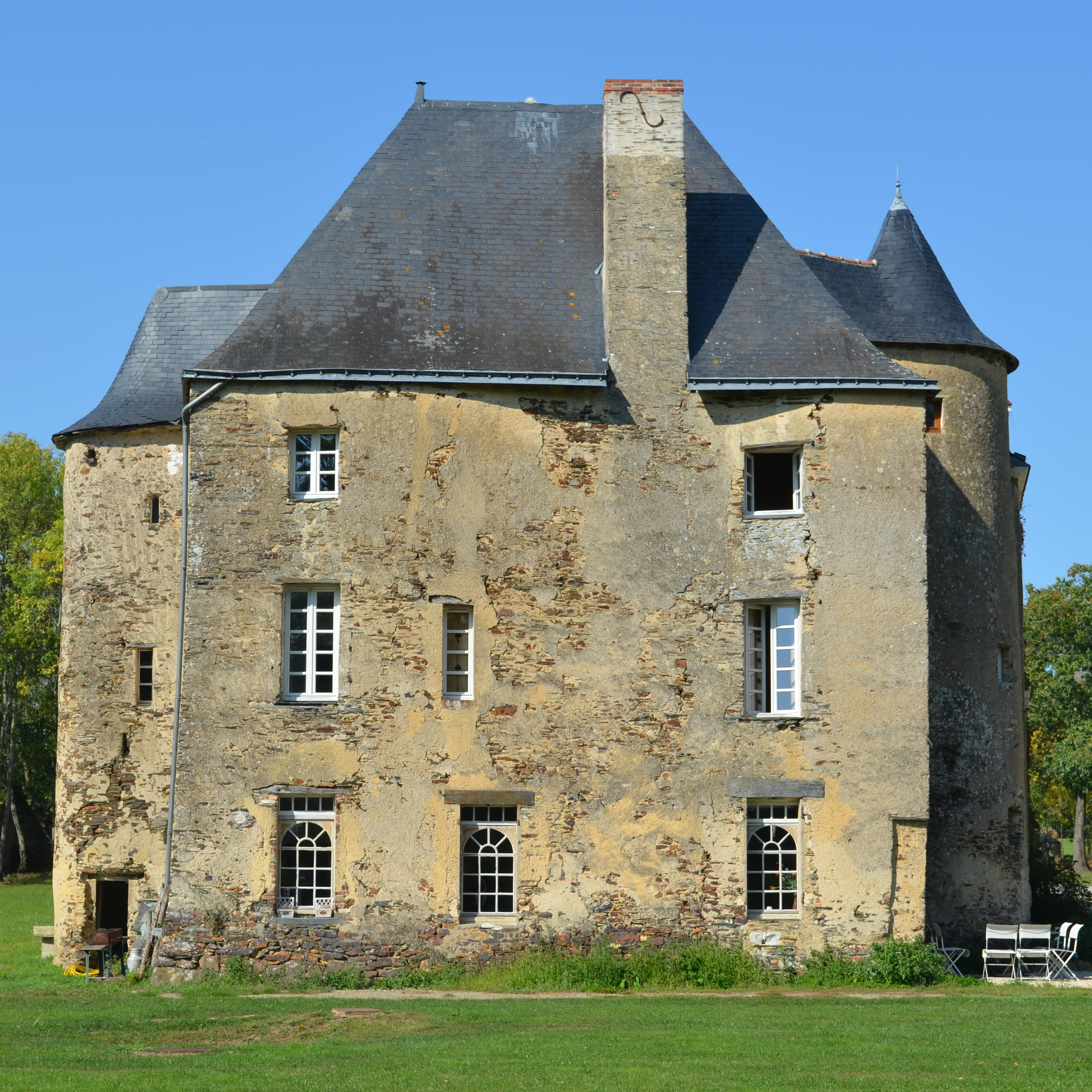
Old forge building at Jahotière.

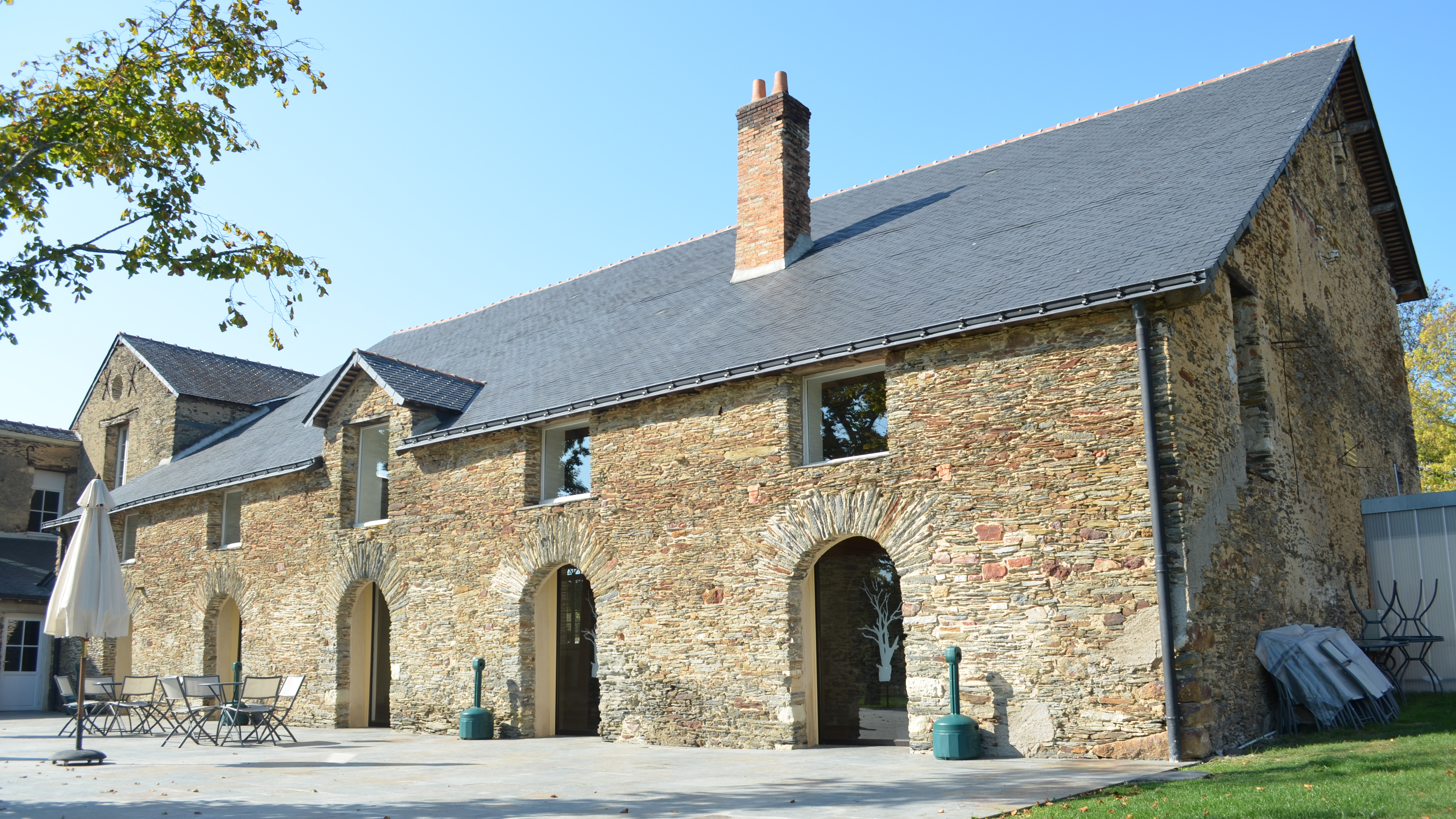
Buildings at the old forge at Jahotière.

== See also ==
- Narrow gauge railway Issé–Abbaretz
- Communes of the Loire-Atlantique department
