= Issé =

Issé Isae (Gallo) Izeg (Breton)
- Commune
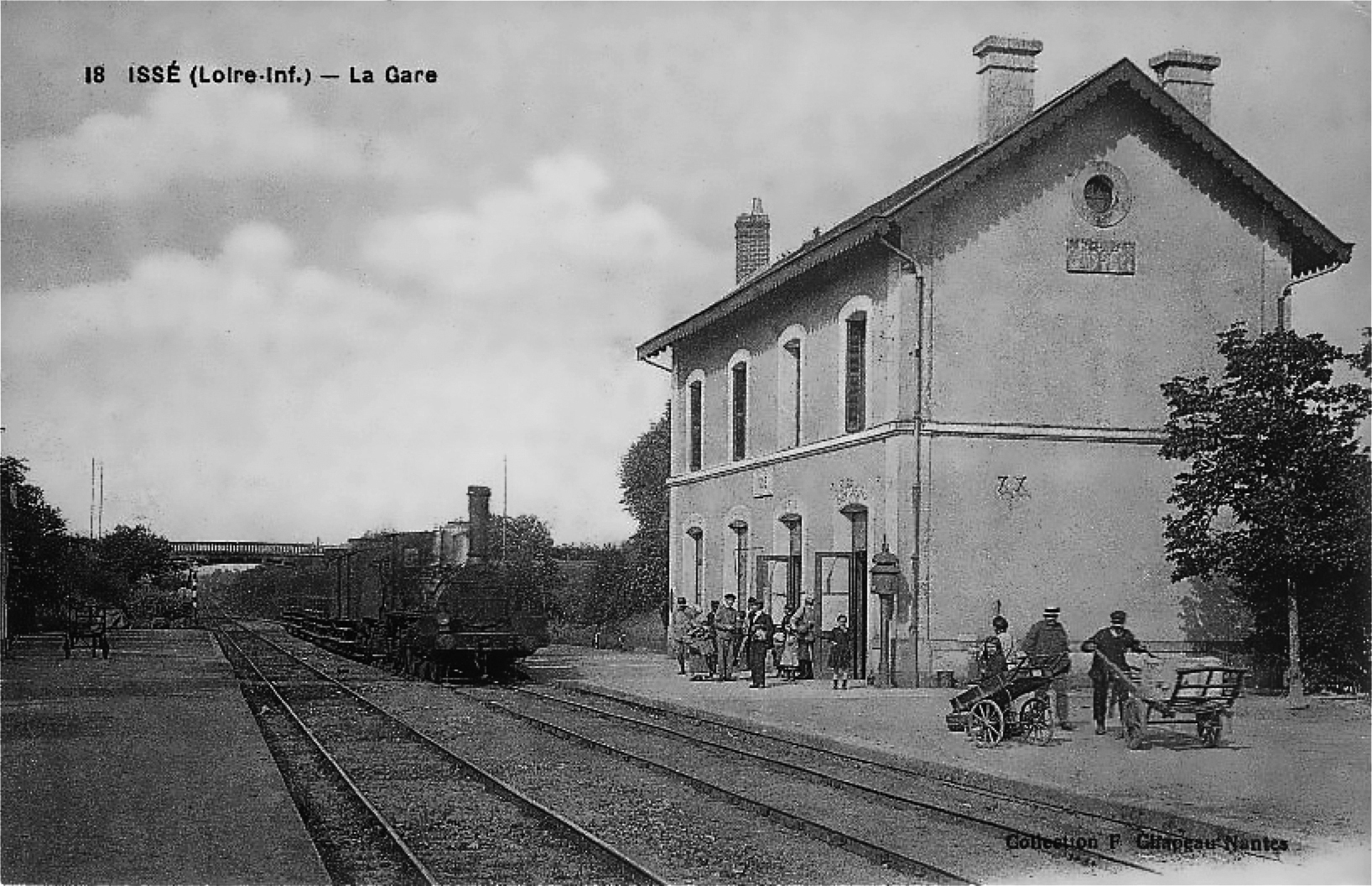
- Old train station in the early 20th century

- Coat of arms
- Location of Issé
- Location within France Location within Pays de la Loire
- Coordinates: 47°37′29″N 1°27′00″W
- Country: France
- Region: Pays de la Loire
- Department: Loire-Atlantique
- Arrondissement: Châteaubriant-Ancenis
- Canton: Châteaubriant
- Intercommunality: Châteaubriant-Derval

Government
  - Mayor (2020–2026): Jean-Marc Lalloué
- Area^{1}: 38.66 km^{2} (14.93 sq mi)
- Highest elevation: 76 m (249 ft)
- Lowest elevation: 22 m (72 ft)
- Population (2023): 1,856
  - Density: 48.01/km^{2} (124.3/sq mi)
- Time zone: UTC+01:00 (CET)
  - Summer (DST): UTC+02:00 (CEST)
- INSEE/Postal code: 44075 /44520
- Website: www.isse.fr
- ^{1} French Land Register data, which excludes lakes, ponds, glaciers > 1 km^{2} (0.386 sq mi or 247 acres) and river estuaries.

Issé (French pronunciation: [ise]; Gallo: Isae, Breton: Izeg) is a commune on the banks of the river Don in the Loire-Atlantique department in western France. It is situated 10 km southeast of Châteaubriant.

== Population ==
Historical population
Year	Pop.	±% p.a.
1968	1,898	—
1975	1,909	+0.08%
1982	1,896	−0.10%
1990	1,821	−0.50%
1999	1,776	−0.28%
2007	1,815	+0.27%
2012	1,846	+0.34%
2017	1,833	−0.14%
2023	1,856	+0.21%
Source: INSEE

== Transport ==
The train station reopened in 2014, serving tram-trains from the Pays de la Loire. The narrow gauge railway Issé–Abbaretz was an approximately 20 km (12 mi) long Decauville railway with a gauge of 600 mm (1 ft 11 5/8 in) between the open-cast iron ore mines near Le Houx and the railway stations of Issé and Abbaretz, which was mainly in operation 1913–1922 and 1928–1930.

== See also ==
- Communes of the Loire-Atlantique department
