= Narrow gauge railway Issé–Abbaretz =

Coordinates: 47.62134°N 1.45298°W

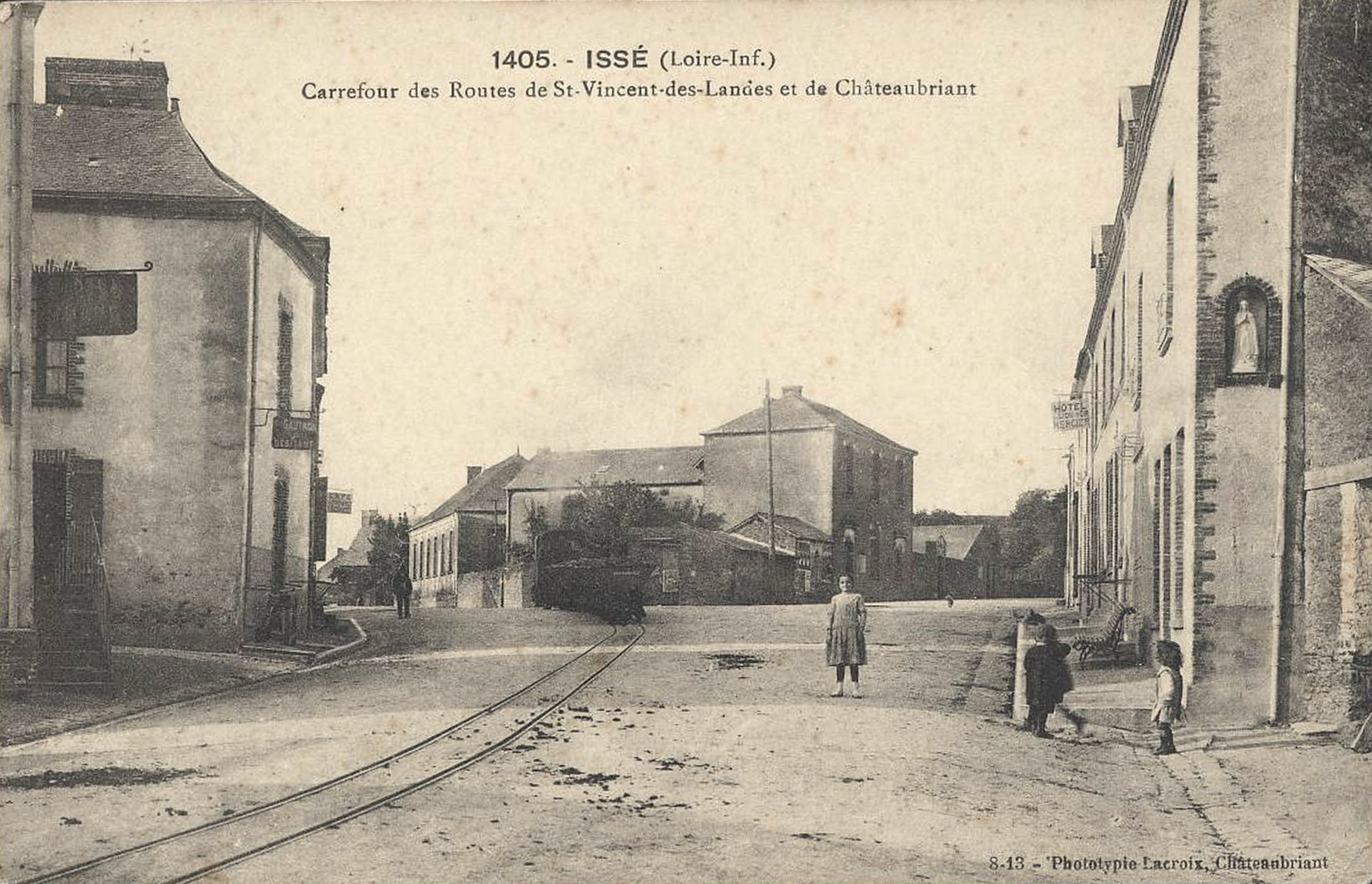
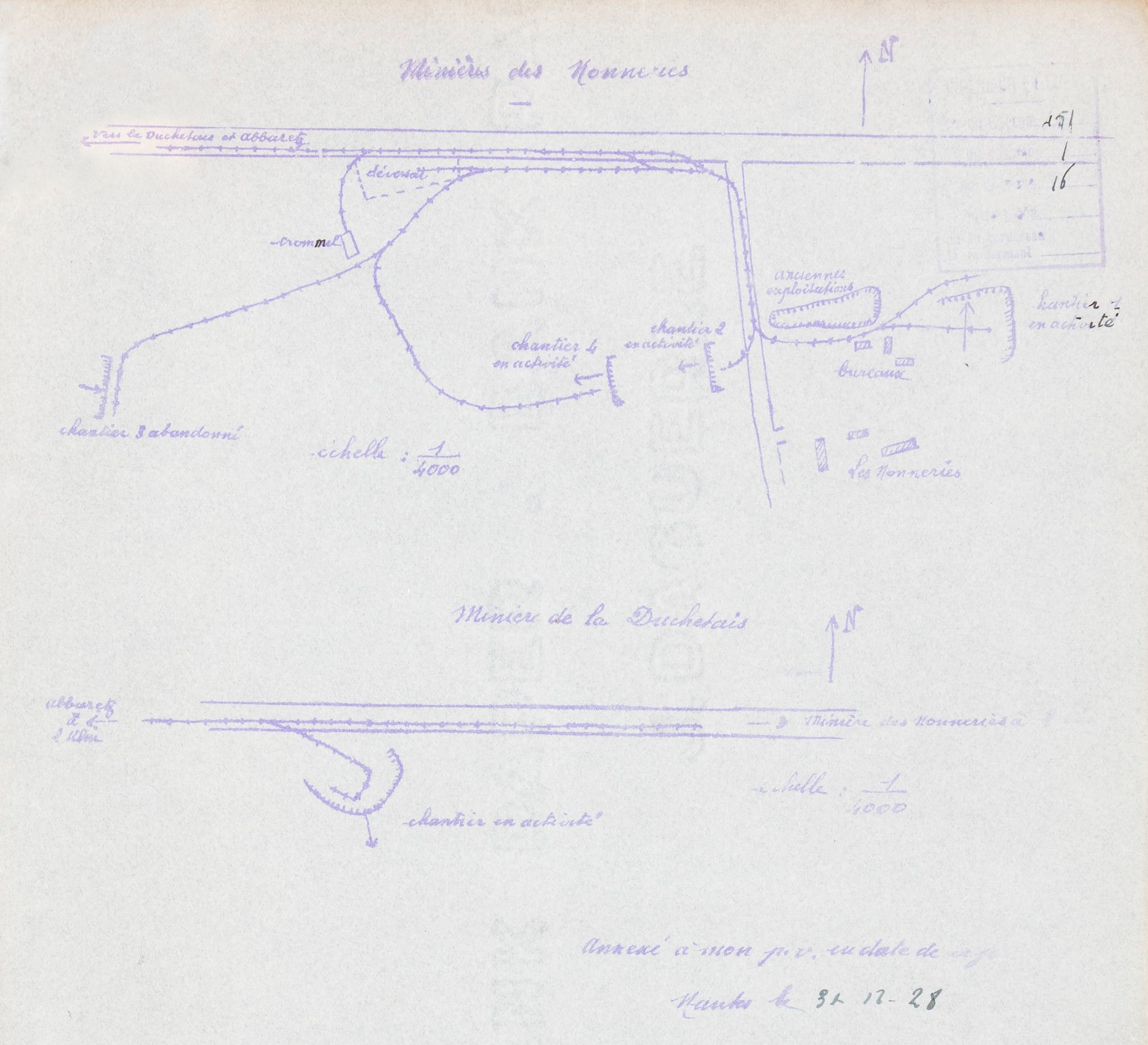
- Steam locomotive with Decauville V skip wagons in Issé at the intersection of the roads to Saint-Vincent-des-Landes and Châteaubriant. Route maps near Les Nonneries and La Duchetais

Technical
- Line length: 20 km (12 mi)
- Track gauge: 600 mm (1 ft 11 5/8 in)

The narrow gauge railway Issé–Abbaretz was an approximately 20 km (12 mi) long Decauville railway with a gauge of 600 mm (1 ft 11 5/8 in) between the open-cast iron ore mines near Le Houx and the railway stations of Issé and Abbaretz in the French département of Loire-Atlantique in the Pays de la Loire region, which was mainly in operation 1913–1922 and 1928–1930.

== Location ==
At Abbaretz was an underground iron ore deposit that formed a lens 30 to 50 metres wide and 5 to 6 kilometres long (approx 45 × 6000 yards). There were several mining sites:

- La Jahotière
- Les Nonneries
- Le Houx
- La Placière
- La Duchetais
- La Lirais
- La Chevrolière
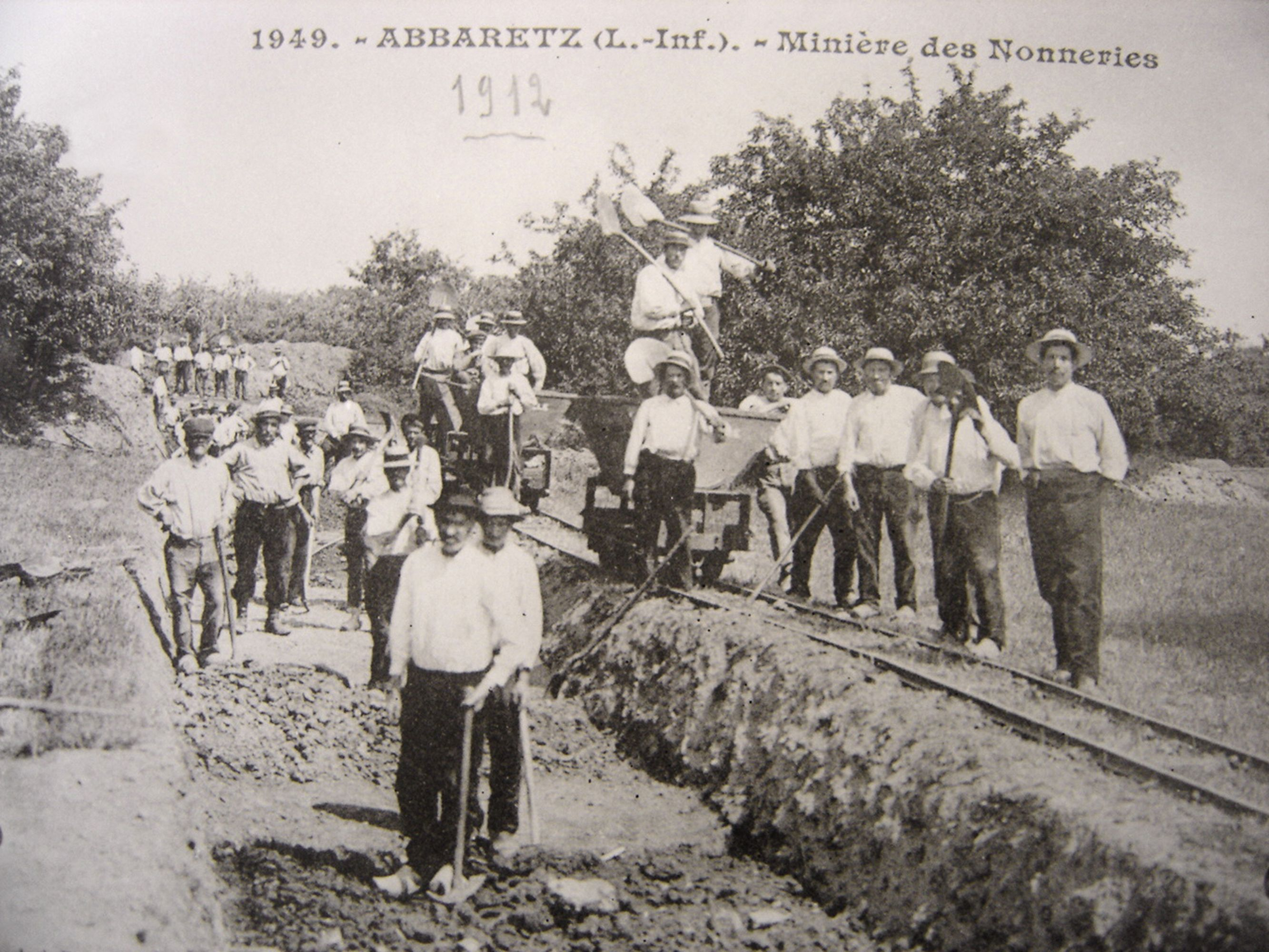
Les Nonneries

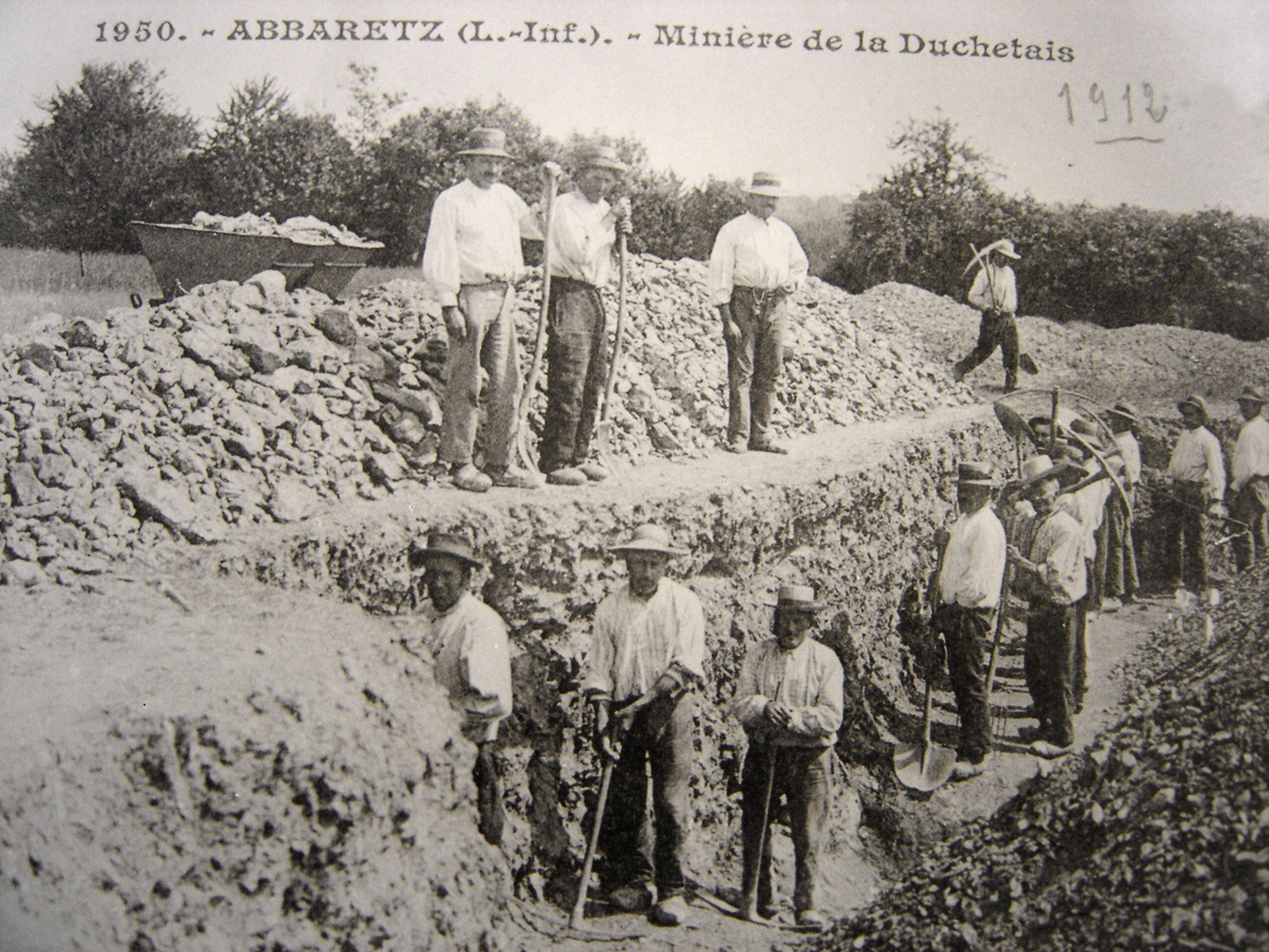
La Duchetais

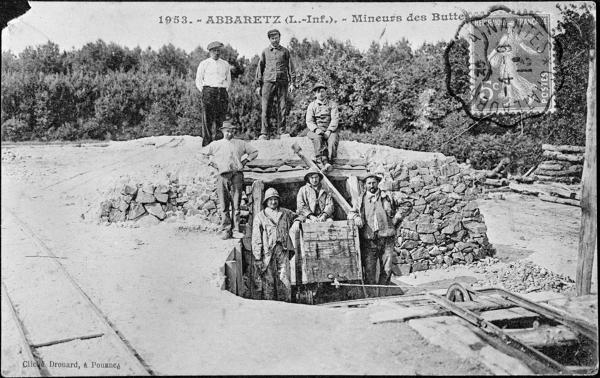
La Butte

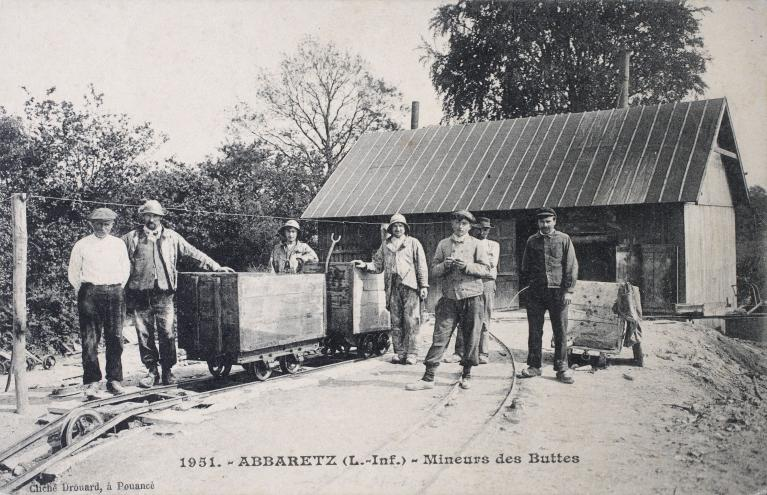
La Butte

== Operation of the mines ==
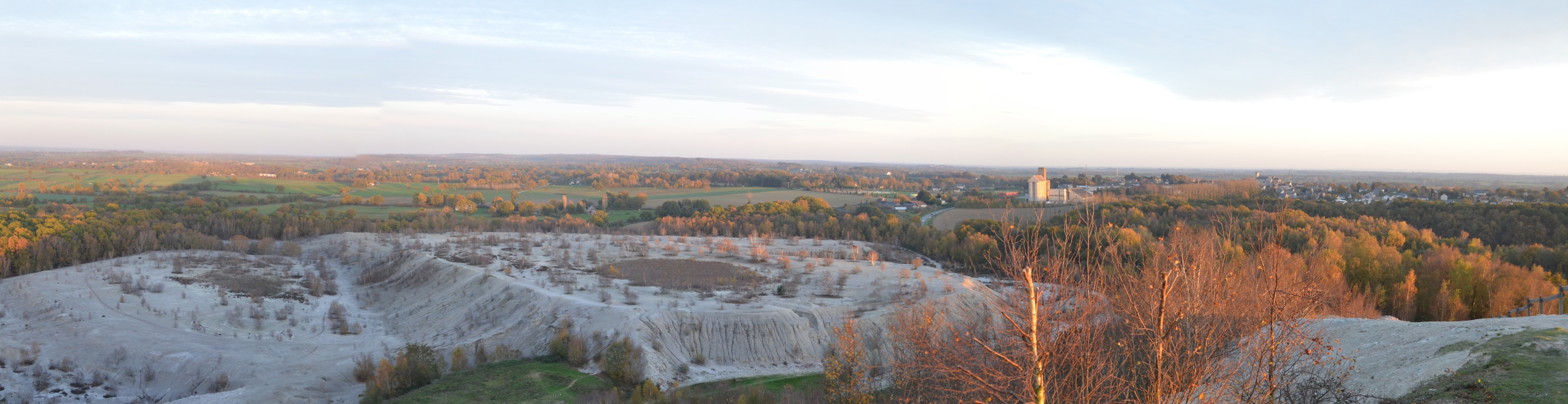
Panorama of the former mines at Abbaretz, 2011

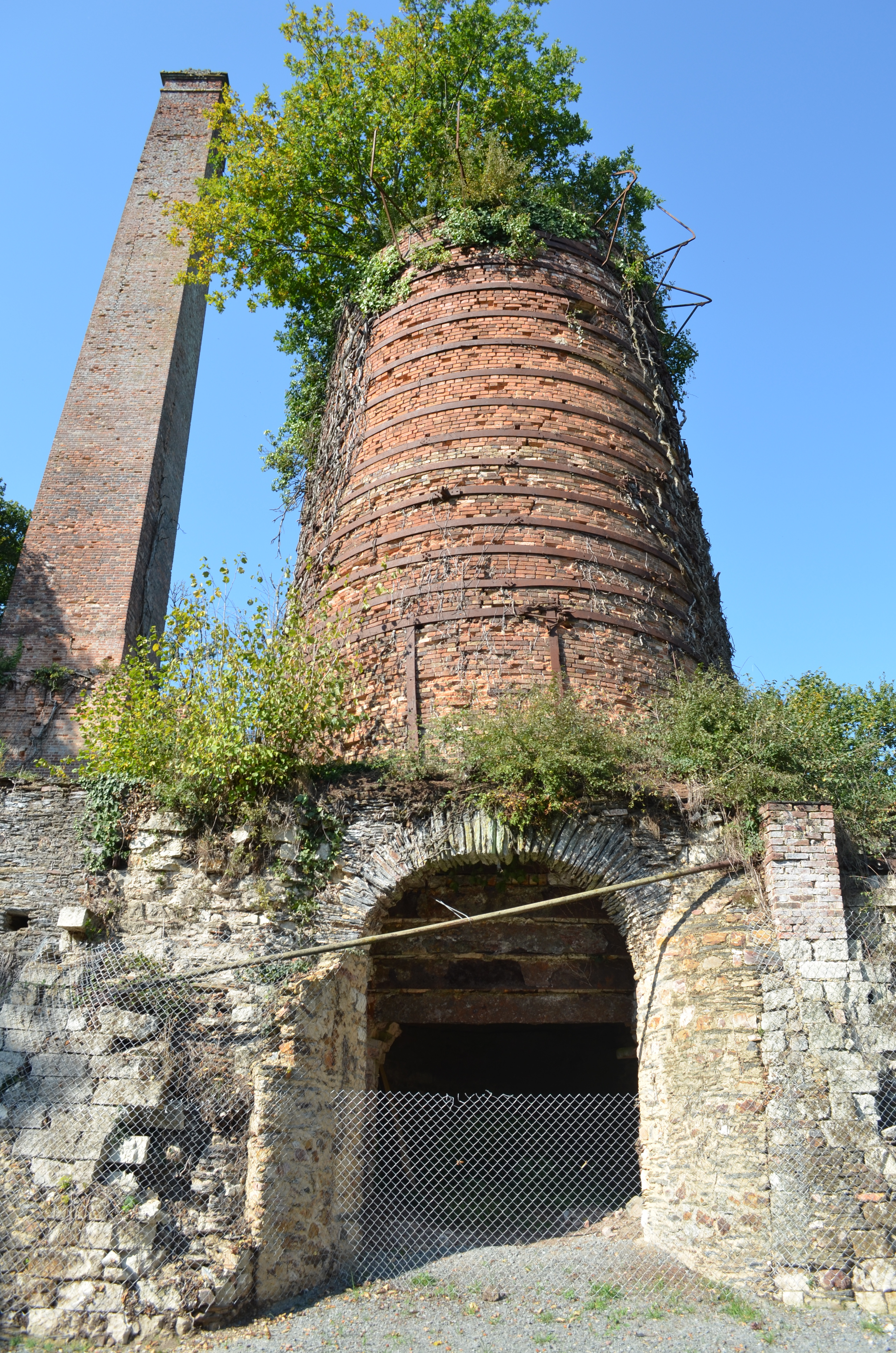
Old blast furnace at La Jahotière, 2011

Iron ore was mined in stages from the beginning of the 19th century until 1931, with two important phases between 1913 and 1922 and 1928 and 1930. The sites were operated by several companies:

- Mines de fer de l'Anjou et des forges de Saint-Nazaire (1882, Le Houx)
- Honorat Borie (1911, Les Placières)
- Mines de fer de Segré (1913, Le Houx, La Duchetais, Les Placières)
- Compagnie minière armoricaine devenue les mines de fer de Bretagne (1913, Les Nonneries)
- Société métallurgique de Basse-Loire (1920, Le Houx, Les Placières)
- Château-Rouge (1927, Le Houx, Les Nonneries, La Duchetais)

In 1912, a total of 118 workers extracted 27,282 tonnes of ore. The iron ore was transported by light railway via a Decauville track laid on the road linking the Abbaretz and Issé railway stations and by lorry to one of the two railway stations and from there by standard gauge railway to Nantes, Chantenay and Saint-Nazaire to the Trignac factories. The abandonment of the mines is explained by the high silicon content, which sometimes exceeded 20 to 25%, and the excessively high transport costs.

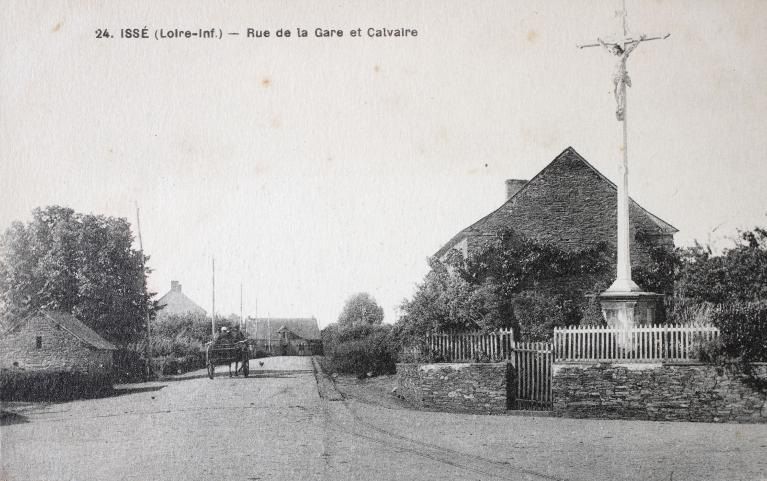
Issé, railway station and calvary

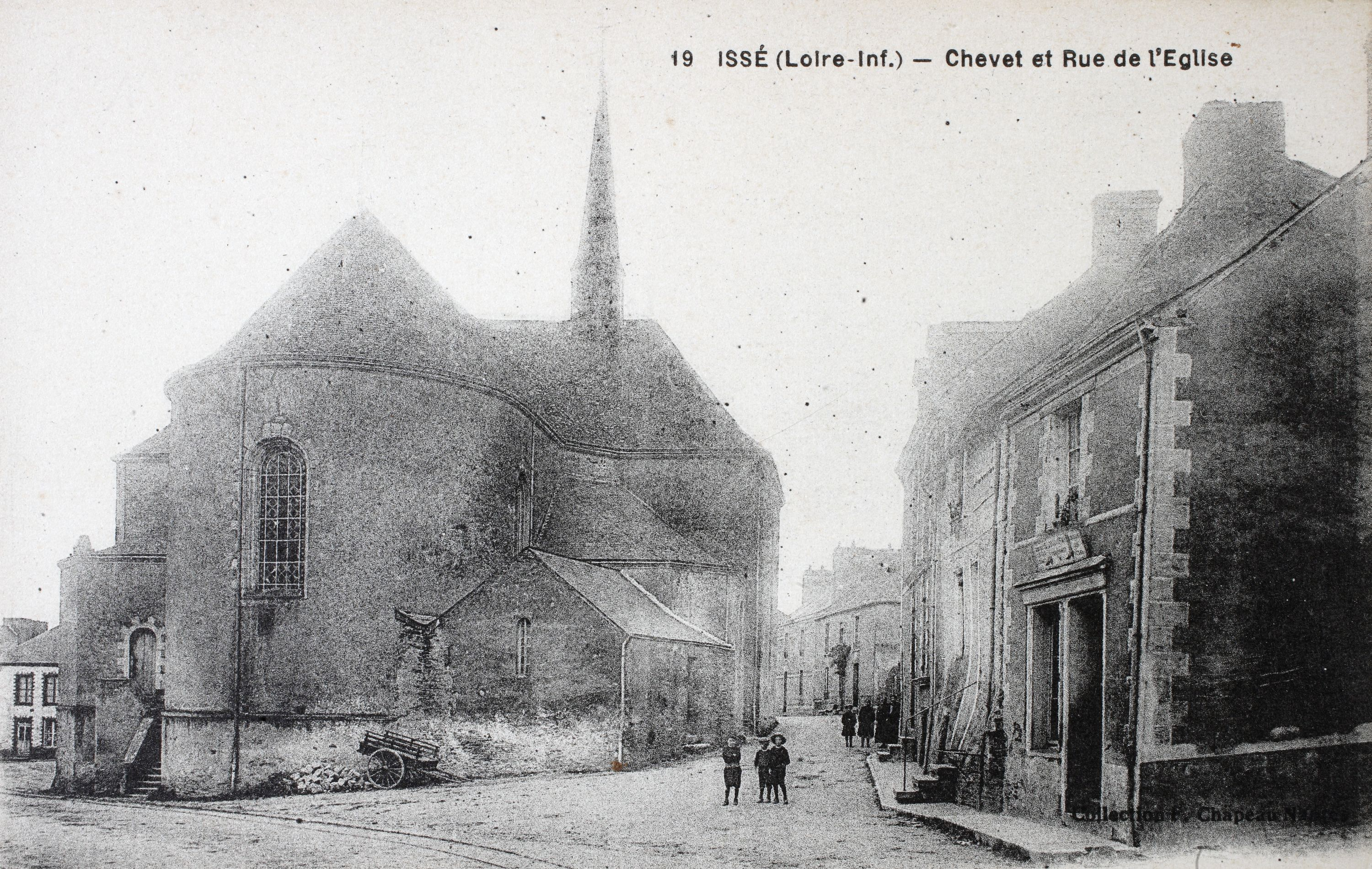
Issé, narrow gauge track at apsis of the church

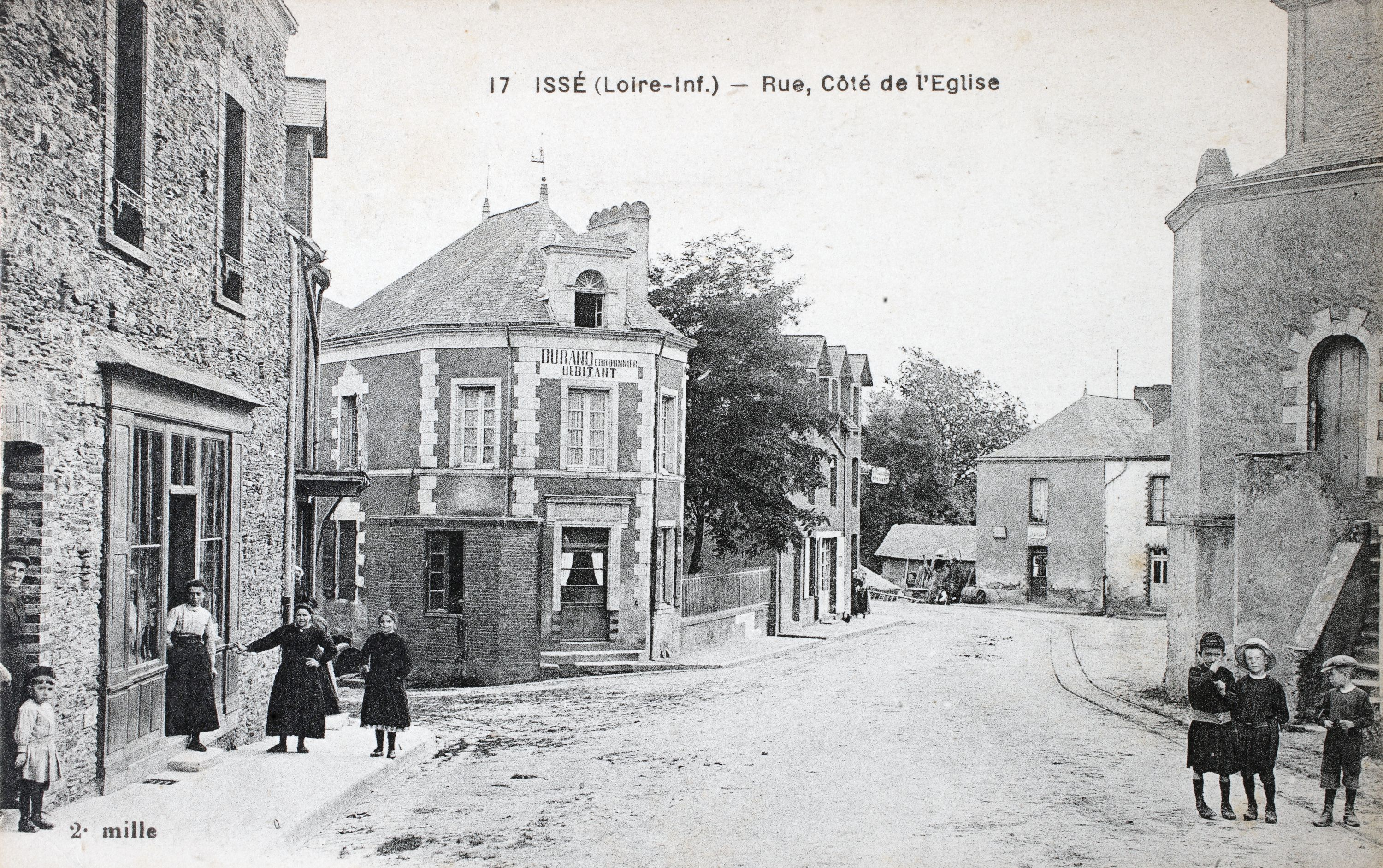
Issé, narrow gauge track at sacristy of the church

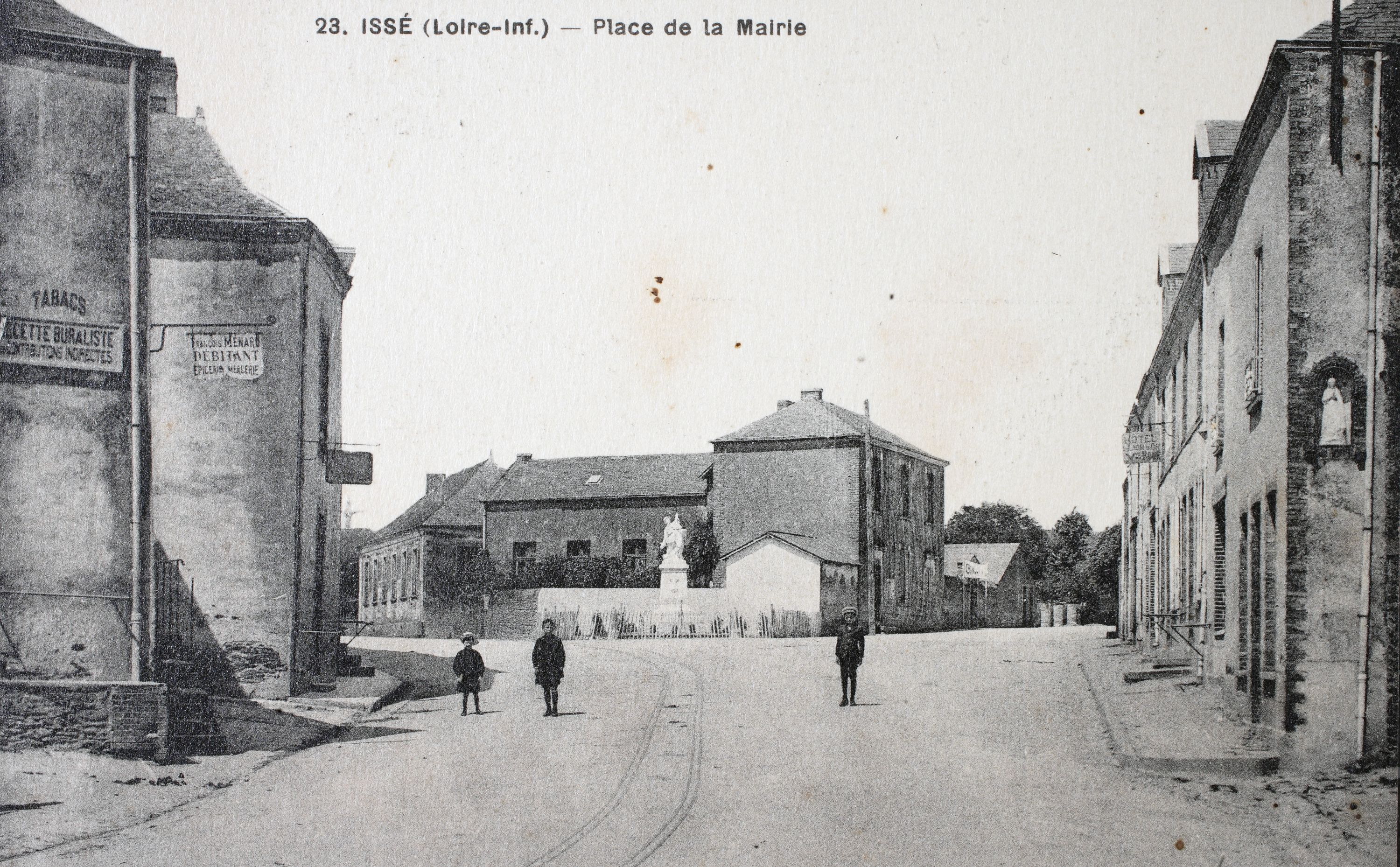
Issé, narrow gauge track at mayor's office
