= Confederate War Memorial (Cape Girardeau, Missouri) =

Memorial to Confederate soldiers in Cape Girardeau, Missouri

Coordinates: 37.3052°N 89.5205°W

- Location: Cape Girardeau, Missouri
- Type: Sculpture
- Opening date: 1931
- Dedicated to: Confederate soldiers

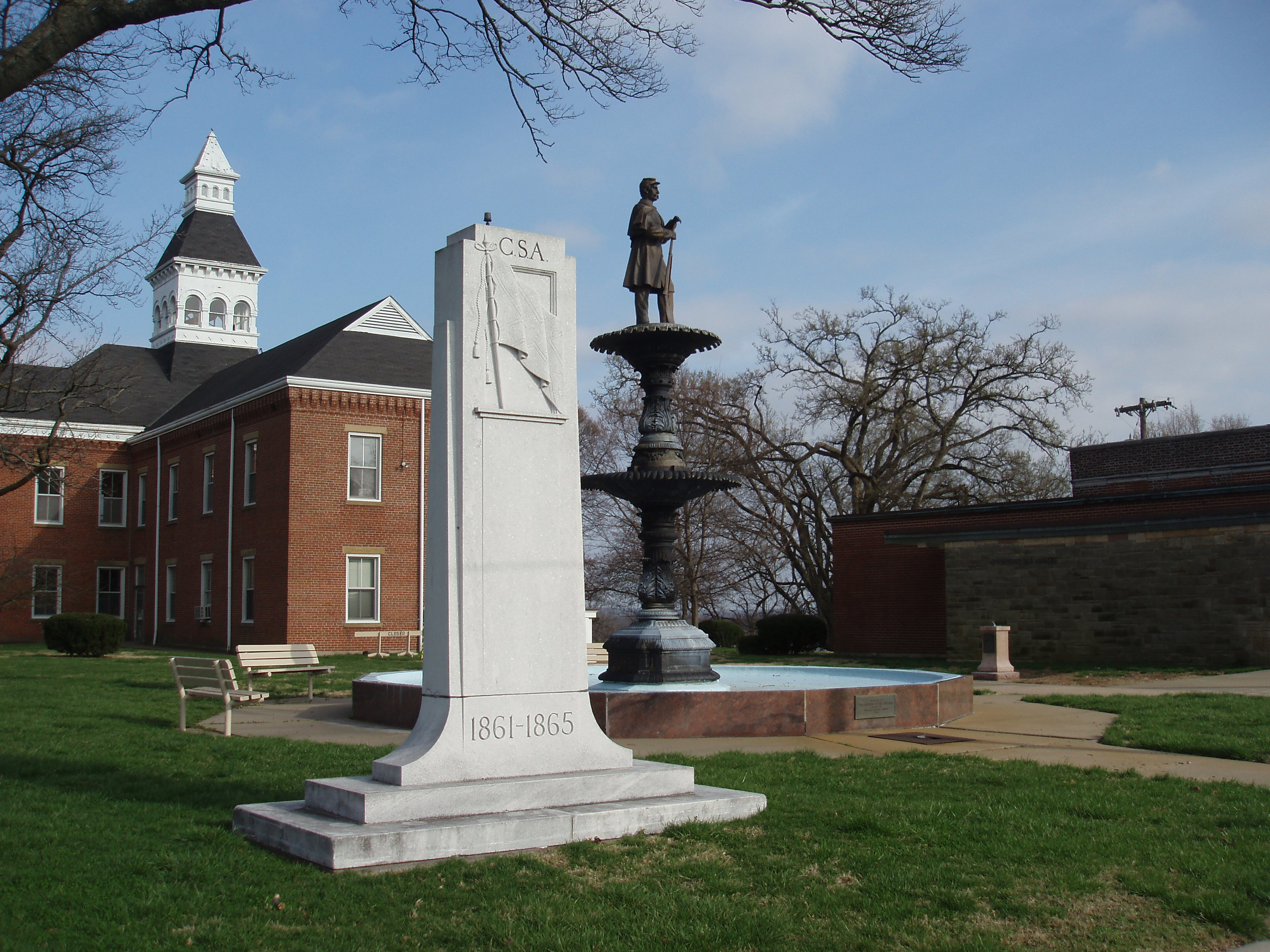
Confederate War Memorial, 2008.

The Confederate War Memorial is a memorial to Confederate soldiers located behind the Common Pleas Courthouse in Cape Girardeau, Missouri. It was erected by the Cape Girardeau United Daughters of the Confederacy in 1931. It was moved to its current location in 1995. Beside it is a fountain and statue erected in 1911 by the Women's Relief Corps. This latter Union monument is dedicated "[i]n memory of the soldiers of the Civil War."

Weighing about 12.5 short tons (11.3 t), or 25,000 pounds (11,000 kg), the memorial depicts the Confederate Battle Flag, the initials "C.S.A." (Confederate States of America), and the years 1861–1865.

On October 10, 2011, the Confederate monument was vandalized with spray paint.

In the summer of 2020 during the height of the Black Lives Matter movement, Cape Girardeau's mayor Bob Fox asked the Cape Girardeau Historic Preservation Commission for advice on what to do with the memorial, as many people had submitted petitions for and against the structure's removal. On June 23, 2020, the Commission unanimously voted to remove and store the monument. On July 6, 2020, the Cape Girardeau City Council unanimously voted to remove the memorial and place it in storage until a suitable place could be found for its relocation. Some city councilors suggested Old Lorimier Cemetery as a possibility, as up to 1200 Confederate and Union soldiers are buried there.
