= Mary Hagan-Harrell =

American politician

Mary M. Hagan-Harrell is a former American Democratic politician from Ferguson, Missouri, who served in the Missouri House of Representatives.

Born in Cape Girardeau, Missouri, she attended Chaffee High School and graduated from Southeast Missouri State University with a bachelor's degree in education and from George Peabody University, now part of Vanderbilt University, in Nashville with a master's degree in legal studies. She previously worked as teacher and librarian for the Riverview Gardens School District from 1960 until 1986. Her husband Stanley A. Harrell who worked for McDonnell-Douglas Aircraft died in 2013.
