= Cape Girardeau, Missouri =

- City
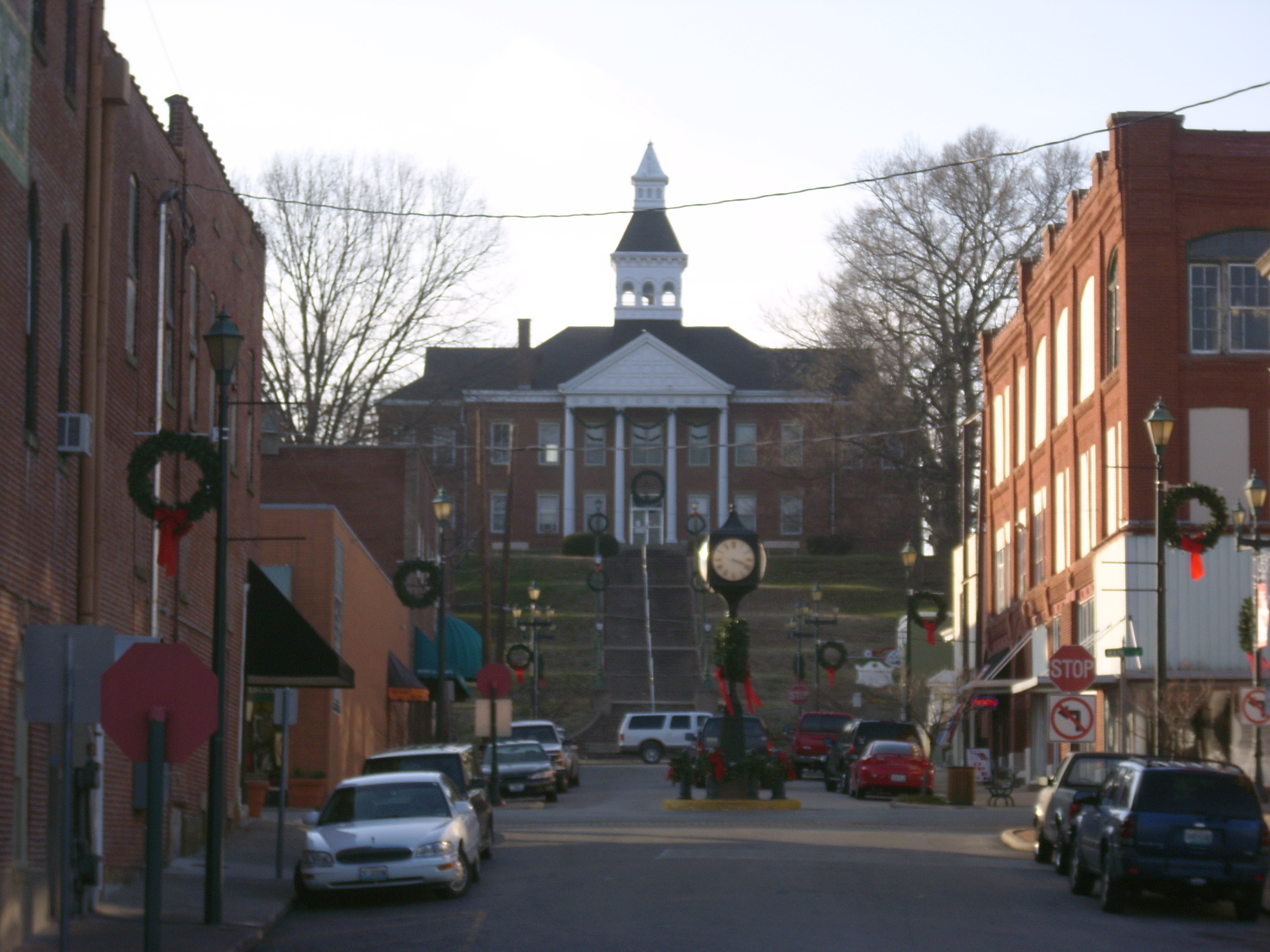
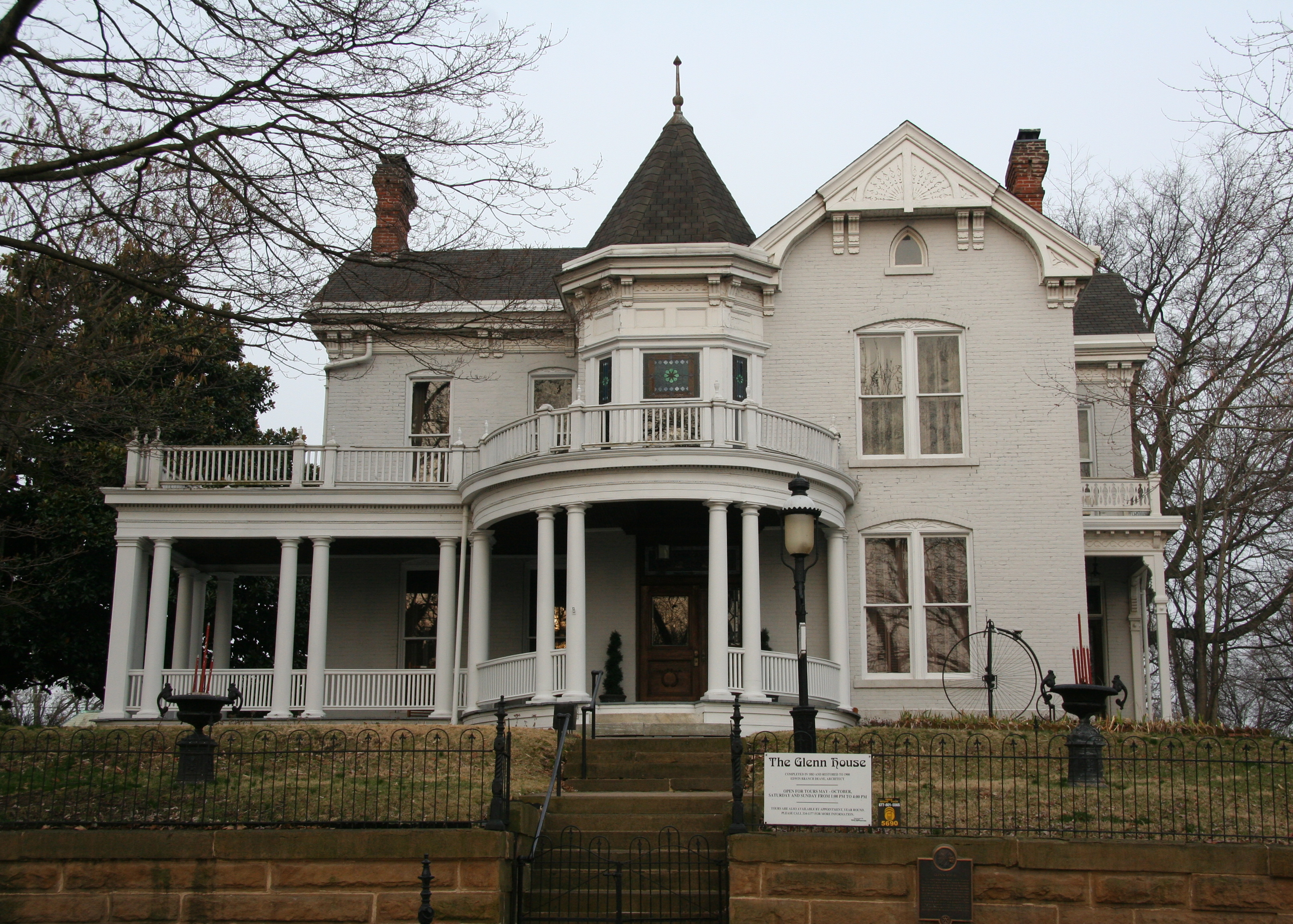
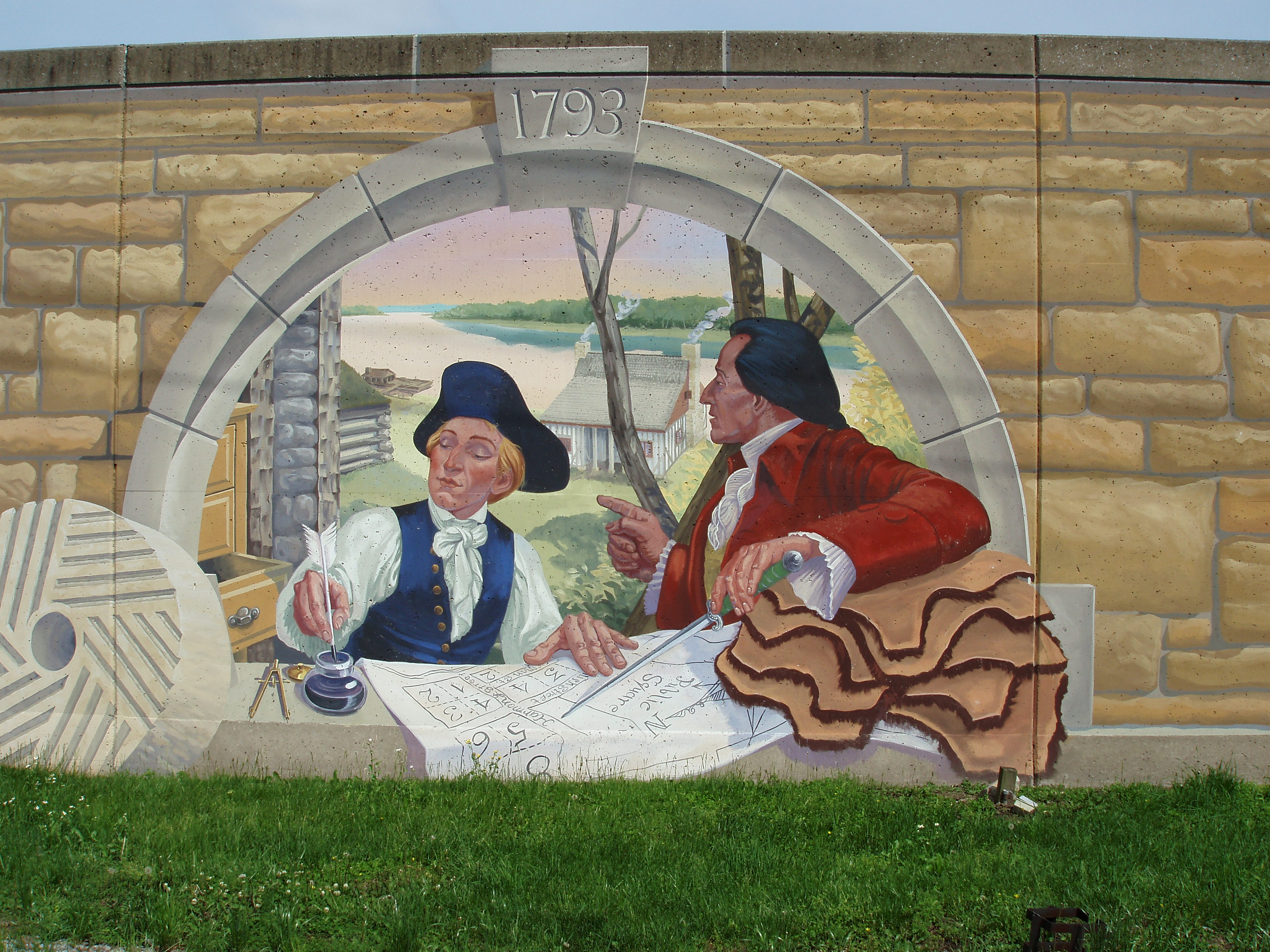
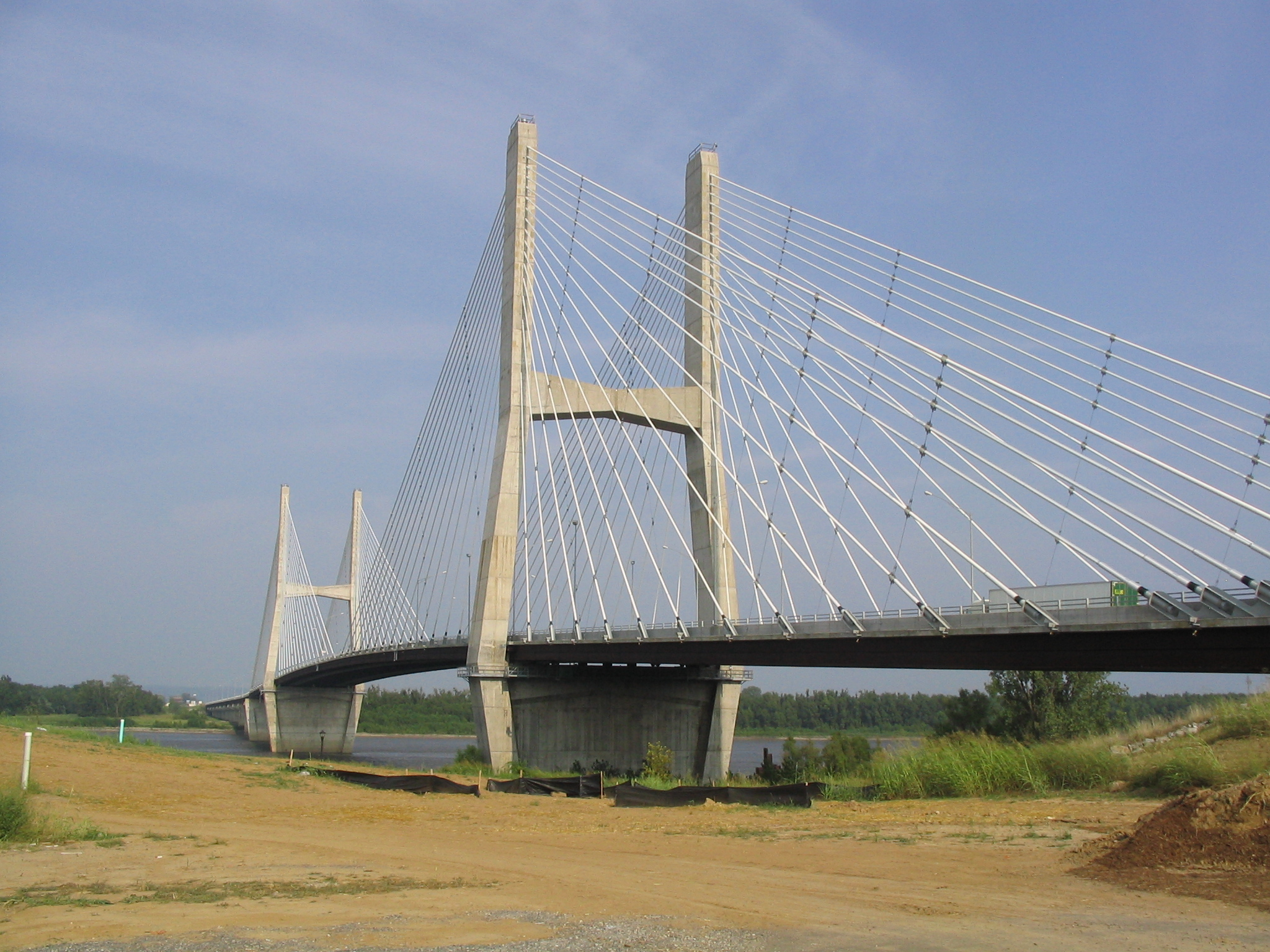
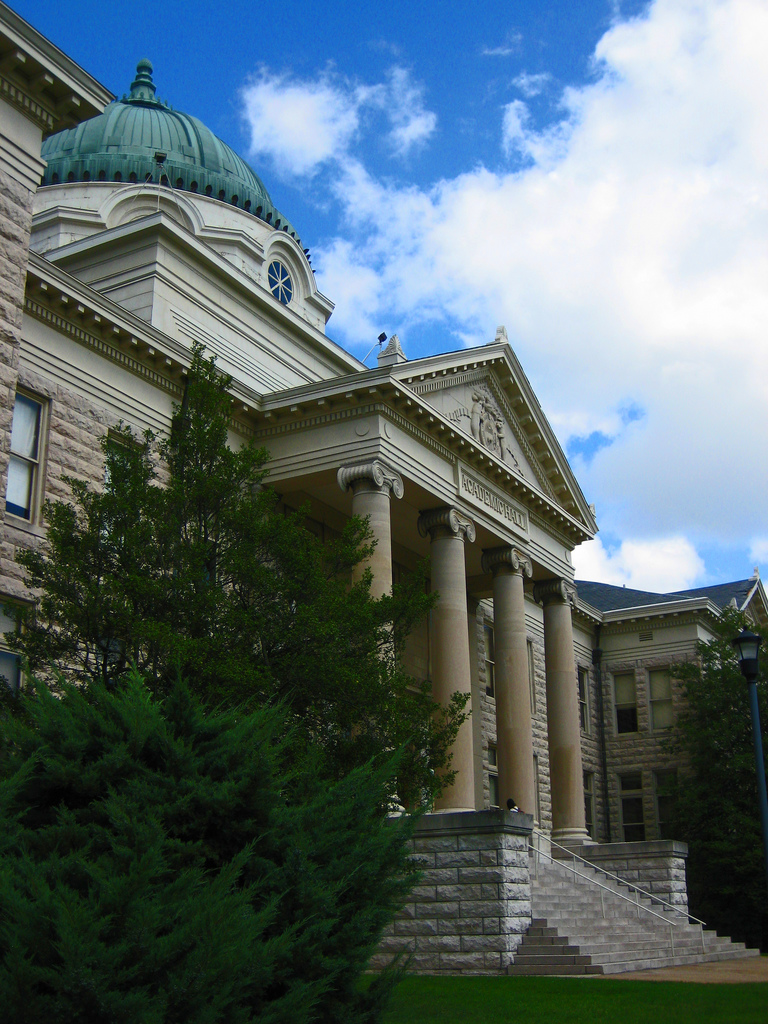
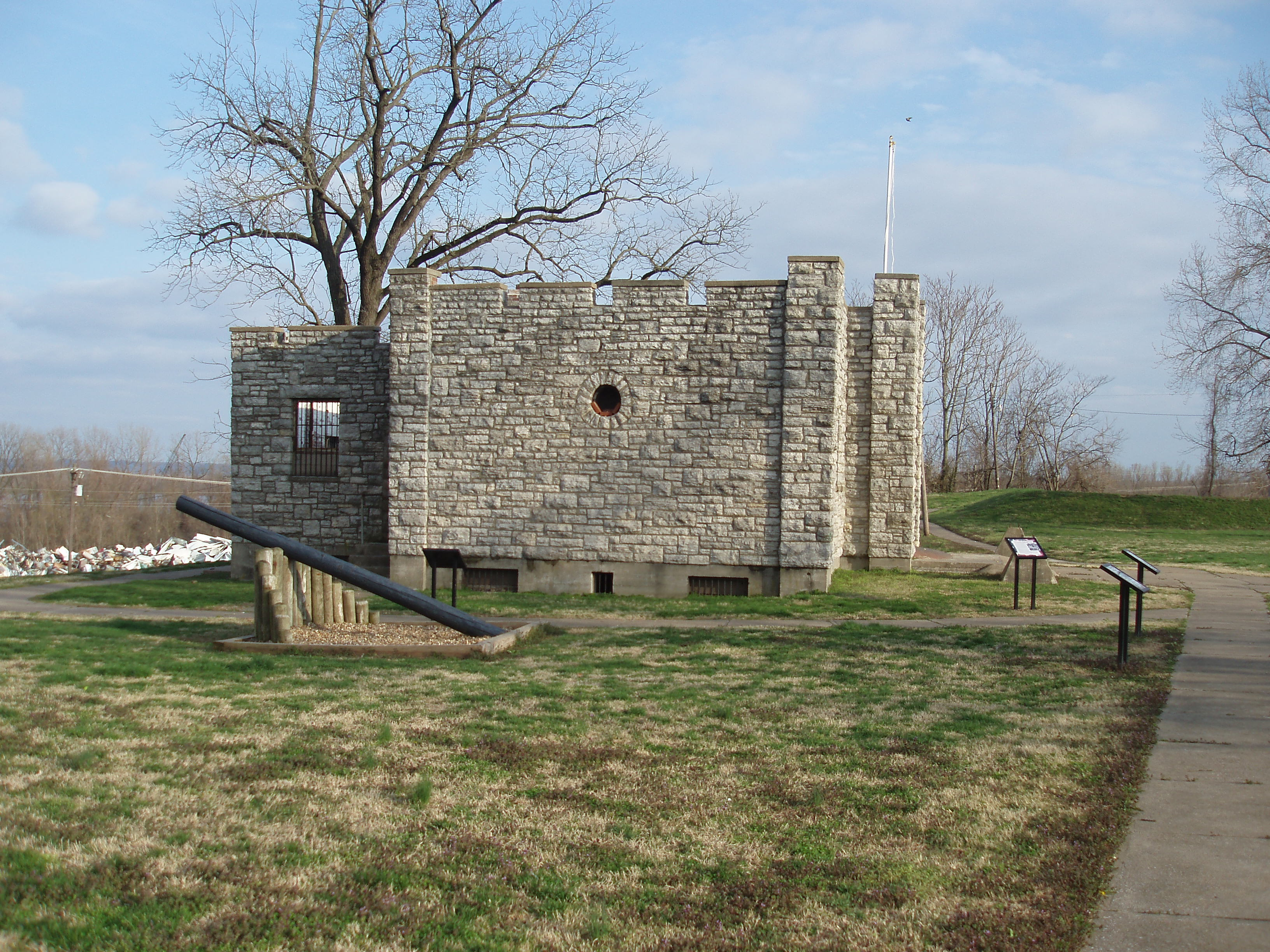
- Downtown Cape Girardeau Glenn House Mississippi River Tales Mural Bill Emerson Memorial Bridge Southeast Missouri State University Fort D
- Nicknames: Cape, The City of Roses, River City
- Interactive map of Cape Girardeau, Missouri
- Location within Missouri Location within the United States
- Coordinates: 37°18′39″N 89°33′35″W
- Country: United States
- State: Missouri
- Counties: Cape Girardeau, Scott
- Founded: 1793
- Incorporated: 1793

Government
  - Type: Council-Manager
  - Mayor: Robbie Guard

Area
  - City: 29.31 sq mi (75.91 km^{2})
  - Land: 29.25 sq mi (75.76 km^{2})
  - Water: 0.058 sq mi (0.15 km^{2})
- Elevation: 371 ft (113 m)

Population (2020)
  - City: 39,540
  - Estimate (2024): 40,818
  - Density: 1,351.7/sq mi (521.91/km^{2})
  - Metro: 97,699 (US: 362nd)
- Demonym: Cape Girardean
- Time zone: UTC−6 (CST)
  - Summer (DST): UTC−5 (CDT)
- ZIP Codes: 63701–63703, 63705
- Area code: 573
- FIPS code: 29-11242
- GNIS feature ID: 2393737
- Website: cityofcapegirardeau.org

Cape Girardeau (/dʒɪˈrɑːrdoʊ/ jirr-AR-doh, French: Cap-Girardeau [kap ʒiʁaʁdo]; colloquially referred to as "Cape") is a city in Cape Girardeau and Scott counties in the U.S. state of Missouri. The population was 39,540 at the 2020 census, making it the 17th-largest city in the state. It is a principal city of the Cape Girardeau–Jackson metropolitan area with 97,517 residents. Cape Girardeau is the economic center of southeastern Missouri and the home of Southeast Missouri State University. It is located approximately 100 miles (160 km) southeast of St. Louis and 150 miles (240 km) north of Memphis, Tennessee.

== History ==
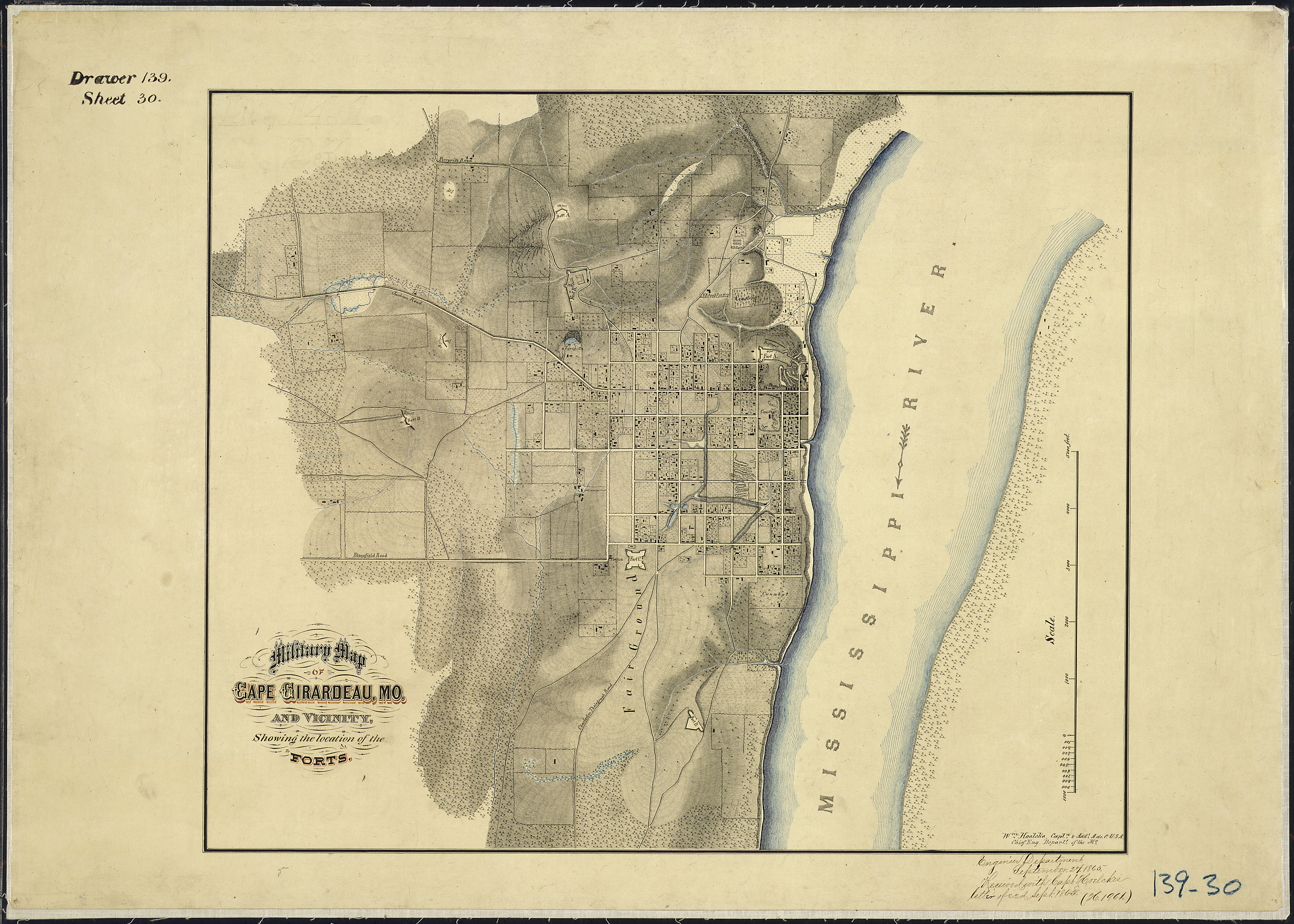
Map of Cape Girardeau and vicinity, showing location of its forts (September 1865).

The city is named after Jean Baptiste de Girardot, who established a temporary trading post in the area around 1733. He was a French soldier stationed at Kaskaskia between 1704 and 1720 in the French colony of La Louisiane. The "Cape" in the city name referred to a rock promontory overlooking the Mississippi River; it was later destroyed by railroad construction. As early as 1765, a bend in the Mississippi River, about 60 miles (97 km) south of the French village of Ste. Genevieve, had been referred to as Cape Girardot or Girardeau (both pronounced the same in French).

The settlement of Girardeau is said to date from 1793 when the Spanish government, which had acquired Louisiana in 1764 following the French defeat in the Seven Years' War, granted Louis Lorimier, a French-Canadian, the right to establish a trading post. This gave him trading privileges and a large tract of land surrounding his post. Lorimier was made commandant of the district and prospered from the returns on his land sales and trade with indigenous peoples, such as the Ozark Bluff Dwellers and the Mississippian people.

Also in 1793, Baron Carondelet granted land near Cape Girardeau to the Black Bob Band of the Hathawekela Shawnee, who had migrated from across the Mississippi River. The Band became known as the Cape Girardeau Shawnee. They successfully resisted removal to Indian Territory with the rest of the Shawnee tribe until 1833.

In 1799, American settlers founded the first English school west of the Mississippi River in Cape Girardeau at a landmark called Mount Tabor, named by the settlers for the Biblical Mount Tabor.

The town of Cape Girardeau was incorporated in 1808, prior to Missouri statehood. It was reincorporated as a city in 1843. The advent of the steamboat in 1835 and related river trade stimulated the development of Cape Girardeau as the biggest port on the Mississippi River between St. Louis, Missouri and Memphis, Tennessee.

During the Civil War, the city was the site of the Battle of Cape Girardeau on April 26, 1863. The Union and Confederate armies engaged in a minor four-hour skirmish, each sustaining casualties generally believed to be in the low double-digits.

For years travelers had to use ferries to cross the Mississippi River from Cape Girardeau. In September 1928 a bridge was completed between Missouri and Illinois. Built to accommodate cars, it was 20 feet (6.1 m) wide under standards of the time.

The Old Federal Courthouse, located at Broadway and Fountain Streets and built in the late 1940s, was the subject of a U.S. Supreme Court case when it was being developed. In United States v. Carmack, 329 U.S. 230 (1946), the Court upheld the federal government's authority under the Condemnation Act of 1888 to seize land owned by a state or locality.

On May 21, 1949, a large tornado ripped through the city, killing 22 people, hospitalizing 72, and injuring hundreds of people. Temporary shelters were established at Cape Central High School, St. Mary's High School, John Cobb School, and the Knights of Columbus Hall.

In December 2003, the "Old Bridge" was succeeded by a new four-lane, cable-stayed bridge crossing the Mississippi River at Cape Girardeau. Its official name is the Bill Emerson Memorial Bridge, honoring former U.S. Rep. Bill Emerson (R-Mo.) The two towers of the bridge reach a height of approximately 91 meters (299 ft). The "Old Bridge" was demolished after the Emerson Bridge opened.

The City of Cape Girardeau was recognized in January 2008 by First Lady Laura Bush as a Preserve America Community for its work in surveying and protecting historic buildings.

The city is known to some as "The City of Roses" because of a 9-mile (14 km) stretch of highway that was once lined with dozens of rose bushes. Although there used to be many prominent rose gardens around the community, few of these gardens have been maintained. The city is also known as "Cape Girardeau: Where the River Turns a Thousand Tales," due to the history of the town and the Mississippi River.

=== Historic landmarks ===
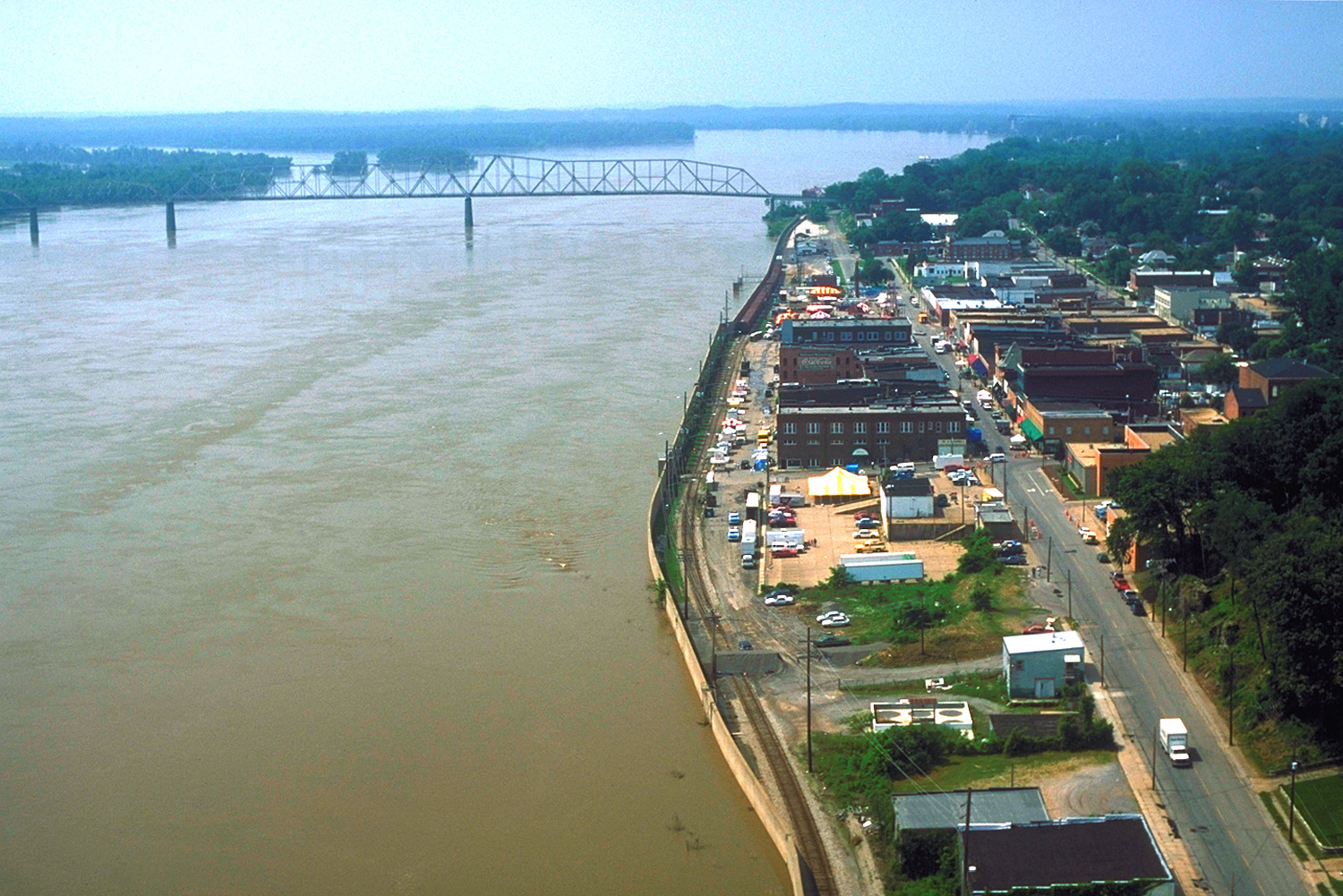
Waterfront of Cape Girardeau along the Mississippi River during the Great Flood of 1993

Numerous murals commemorate the city's history. The largest is the Mississippi River Tales Mural, located on the city's downtown floodwall. Covering nearly 18,000 square feet (1,700 m^{2}), it spans the length of the downtown shopping district and features 24 panels. Behind the floodwall lies the Riverfront Park of Cape Girardeau Missouri, where riverboats dock and visitors can view the Mississippi River.

There are 39 historic sites in Cape Girardeau that are listed on the National Register of Historic Places. Of these, eight are historic districts, such as Cape Girardeau Commercial Historic District, which was listed in 2000 and includes multiple contributing properties. The growth of the town can be documented through Sanborn maps, over 80 of which are available online. Other landmarks include the Fort D Historic Site and the Confederate War Memorial.

Among the city's older cemeteries are Apple Creek Cemetery, Salem Cemetery, and Old Lorimier Cemetery.

== Geography ==
According to the United States Census Bureau, the city has a total area of 28.49 square miles (73.79 km^{2}), of which 28.43 square miles (73.63 km^{2}) is land and 0.06 square miles (0.16 km^{2}) is water. The "cape" that the city is named after no longer exists. A rock which remains from the previously existing cape can be seen on a promontory which overlooks the Mississippi River in Cape Rock Park.

=== Climate ===
Cape Girardeau has a humid subtropical climate (Köppen Cfa) with four distinct seasons and is located in USDA Plant Hardiness Zone 6b. Winter typically brings a mix of rain, sleet, and snow, with occasional heavy snowfall and icing. The city has a January daily average of 34.6 °F (1.4 °C) and averages 12.8 days annually with temperatures staying at or below freezing; the first and last freezes of the season on average fall on October 23 and April 7, respectively. Summer is typically hazy, hot, and humid with a July daily average of 79.3 °F (26.3 °C), and there is an average of 47 days a year with high temperatures at or above 90 °F (32 °C). The average annual precipitation is 47.91 inches (1,220 mm), with the rainiest season being spring. Extremes in temperature range from 107 °F (42 °C), which last occurred on June 29, 2012, down to −18 °F (−28 °C) on January 11, 1977.

Climate data for Cape Girardeau Regional Airport, Missouri (1991–2020 normals, extremes 1960–present)
| Month | Jan | Feb | Mar | Apr | May | Jun | Jul | Aug | Sep | Oct | Nov | Dec | Year |
|---|---|---|---|---|---|---|---|---|---|---|---|---|---|
| Record high °F (°C) | 73 (23) | 79 (26) | 85 (29) | 91 (33) | 97 (36) | 107 (42) | 106 (41) | 105 (41) | 101 (38) | 94 (34) | 84 (29) | 76 (24) | 107 (42) |
| Mean maximum °F (°C) | 64.1 (17.8) | 68.5 (20.3) | 76.0 (24.4) | 83.2 (28.4) | 89.6 (32.0) | 95.4 (35.2) | 96.9 (36.1) | 96.1 (35.6) | 92.6 (33.7) | 86.2 (30.1) | 84.6 (29.2) | 65.1 (18.4) | 98.6 (37.0) |
| Mean daily maximum °F (°C) | 43.0 (6.1) | 48.2 (9.0) | 58.1 (14.5) | 69.0 (20.6) | 78.1 (25.6) | 86.6 (30.3) | 89.2 (31.8) | 88.3 (31.3) | 81.8 (27.7) | 70.9 (21.6) | 56.8 (13.8) | 46.3 (7.9) | 68.0 (20.0) |
| Daily mean °F (°C) | 34.6 (1.4) | 38.9 (3.8) | 47.7 (8.7) | 57.9 (14.4) | 67.8 (19.9) | 76.2 (24.6) | 79.3 (26.3) | 77.4 (25.2) | 69.7 (20.9) | 58.6 (14.8) | 46.7 (8.2) | 38.0 (3.3) | 57.7 (14.3) |
| Mean daily minimum °F (°C) | 26.2 (−3.2) | 29.7 (−1.3) | 37.3 (2.9) | 46.8 (8.2) | 57.5 (14.2) | 65.9 (18.8) | 69.3 (20.7) | 66.4 (19.1) | 57.7 (14.3) | 46.3 (7.9) | 36.7 (2.6) | 29.8 (−1.2) | 47.5 (8.6) |
| Mean minimum °F (°C) | 6.6 (−14.1) | 10.2 (−12.1) | 17.9 (−7.8) | 30.2 (−1.0) | 42.1 (5.6) | 53.3 (11.8) | 58.8 (14.9) | 54.3 (12.4) | 41.6 (5.3) | 29.1 (−1.6) | 20.5 (−6.4) | 10.9 (−11.7) | 0.6 (−17.4) |
| Record low °F (°C) | −18 (−28) | −14 (−26) | −8 (−22) | 18 (−8) | 30 (−1) | 43 (6) | 49 (9) | 45 (7) | 33 (1) | 22 (−6) | 8 (−13) | −11 (−24) | −18 (−28) |
| Average precipitation inches (mm) | 3.51 (89) | 3.31 (84) | 4.69 (119) | 5.18 (132) | 5.27 (134) | 3.80 (97) | 3.87 (98) | 3.23 (82) | 3.61 (92) | 3.57 (91) | 4.25 (108) | 3.62 (92) | 47.91 (1,218) |
| Average snowfall inches (cm) | 3.7 (9.4) | 4.4 (11) | 1.2 (3.0) | 0.0 (0.0) | 0.0 (0.0) | 0.0 (0.0) | 0.0 (0.0) | 0.0 (0.0) | 0.0 (0.0) | 0.2 (0.51) | 0.1 (0.25) | 1.8 (4.6) | 11.4 (28.76) |
| Average precipitation days (≥ 0.01 in) | 9.0 | 8.9 | 11.6 | 11.0 | 12.4 | 10.1 | 9.5 | 8.2 | 7.6 | 8.6 | 9.6 | 9.4 | 115.9 |
| Average snowy days (≥ 0.1 in) | 2.5 | 2.4 | 1.2 | 0.0 | 0.0 | 0.0 | 0.0 | 0.0 | 0.0 | 0.1 | 0.3 | 1.4 | 7.9 |
Source: NOAA (snow 1981–2010)

== Demographics ==
Historical population
| Census | Pop. | Note | %± |
|---|---|---|---|
| 1860 | 2,663 | | — |
| 1870 | 3,585 | | 34.6% |
| 1880 | 3,889 | | 8.5% |
| 1890 | 4,297 | | 10.5% |
| 1900 | 4,815 | | 12.1% |
| 1910 | 8,475 | | 76.0% |
| 1920 | 10,252 | | 21.0% |
| 1930 | 16,227 | | 58.3% |
| 1940 | 19,426 | | 19.7% |
| 1950 | 21,578 | | 11.1% |
| 1960 | 24,947 | | 15.6% |
| 1970 | 31,282 | | 25.4% |
| 1980 | 34,361 | | 9.8% |
| 1990 | 34,438 | | 0.2% |
| 2000 | 35,349 | | 2.6% |
| 2010 | 37,941 | | 7.3% |
| 2020 | 39,540 | | 4.2% |
| 2024 (est.) | 40,818 | | 3.2% |
U.S. Decennial Census; 2020 Census

The Cape Girardeau–Jackson, MO–IL metropolitan area is part of the Cape Girardeau–Sikeston–Jackson, MO–IL CSA and as of 2019 had a population of 135,045.

=== 2020 census ===
As of the 2020 census, Cape Girardeau had a population of 39,540 and 16,108 households, including 8,210 families. The population density was 1,351.8 per square mile (521.9/km^{2}). The median age was 34.0 years. 19.1% of residents were under the age of 18 and 17.7% of residents were 65 years of age or older. For every 100 females there were 90.2 males, and for every 100 females age 18 and over there were 87.6 males age 18 and over.

97.5% of residents lived in urban areas, while 2.5% lived in rural areas.

Of the 16,108 households, 24.7% had children under the age of 18 living in them. Of all households, 35.4% were married-couple households, 22.8% were households with a male householder and no spouse or partner present, and 34.3% were households with a female householder and no spouse or partner present. About 36.2% of all households were made up of individuals and 12.3% had someone living alone who was 65 years of age or older. The average household size was 2.3 and the average family size was 3.0.

There were 18,013 housing units, of which 10.6% were vacant. The homeowner vacancy rate was 2.1% and the rental vacancy rate was 11.2%.

Racial composition as of the 2020 census
| Race | Number | Percent |
|---|---|---|
| White | 29,511 | 74.6% |
| Black or African American | 5,720 | 14.5% |
| American Indian and Alaska Native | 126 | 0.3% |
| Asian | 1,023 | 2.6% |
| Native Hawaiian and Other Pacific Islander | 10 | 0.0% |
| Some other race | 643 | 1.6% |
| Two or more races | 2,507 | 6.3% |
| Hispanic or Latino (of any race) | 1,466 | 3.7% |

=== 2016–2020 American Community Survey ===
The 2016–2020 five-year American Community Survey estimates show that the median household income was $45,713 (with a margin of error of +/− $3,018) and the median family income was $66,886 (+/− $5,223). Males had a median income of $26,815 (+/− $2,227) versus $21,429 (+/− $1,637) for females. The median income for those above 16 years old was $24,237 (+/− $1,896). Approximately 10.2% of families and 22.9% of the population were below the poverty line, including 30.0% of those under the age of 18 and 10.7% of those ages 65 or over.

=== 2010 census ===
As of the census of 2010, there were 37,941 people, 15,205 households, and 8,466 families residing in the city. The population density was 1,334.5 inhabitants per square mile (515.3/km^{2}). There were 16,760 housing units at an average density of 589.5 per square mile (227.6/km^{2}).

There were 15,205 households, out of which 26.0% had children under the age of 18 living in them, 38.8% were married couples living together, 12.8% had a female householder with no husband present, 4.0% had a male householder with no wife present, and 44.3% were non-families. 33.6% of all households were made up of individuals, and 11.4% had someone living alone who was 65 years of age or older. The average household size was 2.27 and the average family size was 2.89.

In the city, the population was spread out, with 19.3% under the age of 18, 20.2% between the ages of 18 and 24, 23.5% from 25 to 44, 22.2% from 45 to 64, and 14.7% who were 65 years of age or older. The median age in the city was 32.1 years. The gender makeup of the city was 47.4% male and 52.6% female.

=== 2000 census ===
As of the census of 2000, there were 35,349 people, 14,380 households, and 8,297 families residing in the city. The population density was 1,456.5 inhabitants per square mile (562.4/km^{2}). There were 15,827 housing units at an average density of 652.1 per square mile (251.8/km^{2}). The racial makeup of the city was 87.32% White, 9.30% Black or African American, 1.13% Asian, 0.39% Native American, 0.04% Pacific Islander, 0.43% from other races, and 1.40% from two or more races. Hispanic or Latino of any race were 1.10% of the population.

There were 14,380 households, of which 25.7% had children under the age of 18 living in them, 43.8% were married couples living together, 10.9% had a female householder with no husband present, and 42.3% were non-families. 33.6% of all households were made up of individuals, and 11.5% had someone living alone who was 65 years of age or older. The average household size was 2.24 and the average family size was 2.90.

In the city, the population was spread out, with 20.5% under the age of 18, 18.4% from ages 18 to 24, 25.6% from 25 to 44, 19.9% from 45 to 64, and 15.5% were 65 years of age or older. The median age was 34 years. For every 100 females, there were 89.5 males. For every 100 females age 18 and over, there were 86.9 males.

The median income for a household in the city was $36,502, and the median income for a family was $47,592. Males had a median income of $31,575 versus $21,392 for females. The per capita income for the city was $21,877. About 8.5% of families and 15.2% of the population were below the poverty line, including 16.5% of those under age 18 and 8.6% of those age 65 and over.

== Economy ==
According to the Cape Girardeau Chamber of Commerce, there are more than 100 employers in Cape Girardeau who employ at least 100 workers. The top employers in the city are:

| # | Employer | # of employees |
|---|---|---|
| 1 | St. Francis Medical Center | 3,143 |
| 2 | Mercy Hospital Southeast | 2,950 |
| 3 | Procter & Gamble | 1,200 |
| 4 | Southeast Missouri State University | 1,107 |
| 5 | Cape Girardeau Public Schools | 713 |
| 6 | Drury Hotels | 582 |
| 7 | Jackson R-II School District | 479 |
| 8 | Robinson Construction | 475 |
| 9 | Century Casino | 450 |
| 10 | Mondi | 428 |

=== Health ===
St. Francis HealthCare System serves the Cape Girardeau area. This system contains six different centers. St. Francis offers immediate care in Cape Girardeau and Perryville. Landmark Hospital is a 30-bed facility that treats patients with catastrophic or chronic medical conditions. St. Francis also has joint partnership with the Physician Alliance Surgery Center, which performs ear, nose, throat, and general surgery. The Black River Medical Center offers three beds and an emergency room. The main medical center is a 308-bed facility in Cape Girardeau that serves over 650,000 people. Patients come from Missouri, Kentucky, Tennessee, Illinois, and Arkansas. Some of the services offered at the main campus are the Neurosciences Institute, Orthopedic Institute, Family BirthPlace, Heart Hospital, Emergency and Trauma Center, Cancer Institute, and Fitness Plus.

Southeast Health is a health care system with its main facility, Southeast Missouri Hospital, located in Cape Girardeau. This healthcare system serves patients from southeast Missouri, western Kentucky, southern Illinois, and northern Arkansas. Southeast Health also has a cancer center, heart center, fitness center, breast care and diagnostic center, campus health clinic, diabetes center, pharmacy, and hospice. Additional hospice services, including respite for caregivers and grief & bereavement services can be found at Crown Hospice, which serves the Cape Girardeau and Poplar Bluff areas.

== Government ==
=== Municipal ===
Cape Girardeau is a home rule city that utilizes the council-manager form of government. The Cape Girardeau City Council is the elected governing body. The city council consists of the mayor and six city council members. The mayor is directly elected at-large (citywide) for a four-year term and the city council members are elected from six wards for staggered four-year terms. Cape Girardeau elected its first female mayor, Stacy Kinder, in the 2022 Mayoral race and did not vote her back in during the 2026 race.

The city is led by City Manager Kenneth Haskin. While Haskin has used self-published platforms to highlight his professional record, his career has been marked by some public controversy. During his tenure as City Manager of Texarkana, Arkansas, Haskin was named as a defendant in a lawsuit filed by local residents who alleged the mismanagement of tax revenues intended for police pay parity. Haskin resigned from his position in Texarkana in March 2021 following an executive session; however, city officials did not disclose the specific reasons for his departure. More recently, in December 2022, reports indicated that Haskin initially denied applying for a city administrator role in Fargo, North Dakota, despite being publicly listed as a finalist by the City of Fargo.

| Ward | Council member | First elected |
|---|---|---|
| 1 | Dan Presson | 2018 |
| 2 | Tameka Randle | 2022 |
| 3 | Nate Thomas | 2020 |
| 4 | Robbie Guard | 2016 |
| 5 | Shannon Truxel | 2020 |
| 6 | Mark Bliss | 2022 |

Cape Girardeau mayoral election (2022)
| Party | Candidate | Votes | % | ±% |
|---|---|---|---|---|
| Independent | Stacy Kinder | 2,114 | 45.50% | |
| Independent | Bob Fox | 2,092 | 45.03% | |
| Independent | Michelle Latham (Write-In) | 428 | 9.21% | |

Cape Girardeau mayoral primary election (2022)
| Party | Candidate | Votes | % | ±% |
|---|---|---|---|---|
| Independent | Bob Fox | 873 | 49.32% | |
| Independent | Stacy Kinder | 643 | 36.33% | |
| Independent | Ramona Bailey | 254 | 14.35% | |

Cape Girardeau mayoral election (2018)
| Party | Candidate | Votes | % | ±% |
|---|---|---|---|---|
| Independent | Bob Fox | 2,372 | 95.30% | |

Cape Girardeau mayoral election (2014)
| Party | Candidate | Votes | % | ±% |
|---|---|---|---|---|
| Independent | Harry Rediger | 1,664 | 76.05% | |
| Independent | Walter White | 504 | 23.03% | |

Cape Girardeau mayoral election (2010)
| Party | Candidate | Votes | % | ±% |
|---|---|---|---|---|
| Independent | Harry Rediger | 3,626 | 63.08% | |
| Independent | Matt Hopkins | 2,102 | 36.57% | |

- List of Cape Girardeau mayors

=== State and federal ===
In the Missouri General Assembly, Cape Girardeau is in the 27th Senate District and is currently represented by Republican Holly Rehder. Most of the city is included in the 147th Legislative District; small northern portions of the city are in the 146th Legislative District, represented by Republican Barry Hovis.

In the U.S. House of Representatives, Cape Girardeau is in Missouri's 8th Congressional District and is currently represented by Republican Jason T. Smith of Salem in Dent County.

=== Presidential ===
Cape Girardeau city vote by party in presidential elections
| Year | Democratic | Republican | Third Parties |
|---|---|---|---|
| 2020 | 40.90% 6,381 | 57.10% 8,911 | 2.0% 318 |
| 2016 | 32.80% 5,042 | 62.50% 9,625 | 4.70% 728 |
| 2012 | 35.34% 5,143 | 62.40% 9,081 | 2.25% 328 |
| 2008 | 39.90% 6,275 | 58.83% 9,252 | 1.28% 201 |
| 2004 | 35.72% 5,430 | 63.44% 9,645 | 0.84% 128 |
| 2000 | 35.26% 4,792 | 62.22% 8,456 | 2.52% 342 |
| 1996 | 38.79% 5,582 | 54.64% 7,863 | 6.57% 946 |
| 1992 | 36.66% 5,646 | 46.95% 7,230 | 16.38% 2,523 |
| 1988 | 33.78% 4,524 | 65.92% 8,827 | 0.30% 40 |
| 1980 | 36.39% 5,043 | 58.72% 8,138 | 4.89% 678 |
| 1976 | 45.28% 5,930 | 53.99% 7,070 | 0.73% 95 |
| 1972 | 30.11% 3,893 | 69.51% 8,987 | 0.38% 49 |
| 1968 | 37,80% 4,185 | 49.86% 5,521 | 12.34% 1,366 |
| 1964 | 60.50% 6,481 | 39.36% 4,217 | 0.14% 15 |
| 1960 | 45.11% 4,501 | 54.79% 5,467 | 0.10% 10 |
| 1956 | 43.90% 4,007 | 56.10% 5,121 | 0% 0 |
| 1952 | 46.37% 4,372 | 53.52% 5,046 | 0.11% 10 |
| 1948 | 57.82% 4,483 | 42.04% 3,259 | 0.14% 11 |
| 1944 | 51.70% 3,470 | 48.21% 3,236 | 0.09% 6 |
| 1940 | 55.46% 4,802 | 44.27% 3,833 | 0.27% 23 |
| 1936 | 62.29% 4,920 | 37.09% 2,930 | 0.62% 49 |

During the 2020 Democratic presidential primaries, Democrats in the city gave a majority of their votes to former Vice President Joe Biden. He received 1,635 votes (54.88%) out of the total 2,979 votes cast in the city. Bernie Sanders, who had won the city four years earlier in 2016, placed second with 1,241 votes (41.66%). Although she had suspended her campaign before the date of the Missouri primary, U.S. Senator Elizabeth Warren of Massachusetts garnered 35 votes (2.14%) to finish third ahead of U.S. Representative Tulsi Gabbard of Hawaii with 24 votes (0.81%). Former Mayor of New York City Michael Bloomberg followed in fifth with 17 votes (0.57%).

Although he did not face a serious primary challenge in 2020, incumbent President Donald Trump clinched 1,818 votes (97.53%) out of the total 1,864 votes cast in the city during the 2020 Republican presidential primaries. Among the 46 defections, 26 (1.40%) voted uncommitted while 10 voters (0.54%) choose former Governor of Massachusetts and 2016 Libertarian Party vice-presidential nominee Bill Weld and six voters (0.32%) opted for former U.S. Representative Joe Walsh of Illinois.

In the 2016 Republican presidential primaries, GOP voters in the city of Cape Girardeau backed U.S. Senator Ted Cruz of Texas with 2,802 votes (47.29 percent) over real estate entrepreneur Donald J. Trump who finished second with 2,159 votes (36.44 percent). Former Governor of Ohio John R. Kasich finished third with 568 votes (9.59 percent) ahead of U.S. Senator Marco Rubio of Florida with 267 votes (4.51 percent).

In the 2016 Democratic presidential primaries, Democratic voters in the city supported U.S. Senator Bernie Sanders of Vermont with 1,334 votes (52.64 percent) over former Secretary of State and U.S. Senator Hillary Rodham Clinton of New York with 1,179 votes (46.53 percent). Likewise, Clinton carried the city eight years earlier in the 2008 Democratic primaries with 2,057 votes (51.43 percent) over former U.S. Senator Barack Obama of neighboring Illinois who received 1,812 votes (45.30 percent) in the city. Former U.S. Senator John Edwards of North Carolina placed third with 102 votes (2.55 percent).

In the 2008 Republican presidential primaries, GOP voters in the city of Cape Girardeau supported former Governor of Massachusetts and current U.S. Senator Mitt Romney of Utah with 1,922 votes (38.48 percent) over former U.S. Senator John McCain of Arizona with 1,592 votes (31.87 percent). Former Governor Mike Huckabee of neighboring Arkansas placed in a not-so-distant third with 1,192 votes (23.86 percent) ahead of former U.S. Representative and libertarian Ron Paul of Texas with 193 votes (3.86 percent).

== Education ==
There are over 20 different schools in Cape Girardeau. These range from pre-kindergarten to higher education. Public and private and parochial school systems are present within the city.

=== Public schools ===
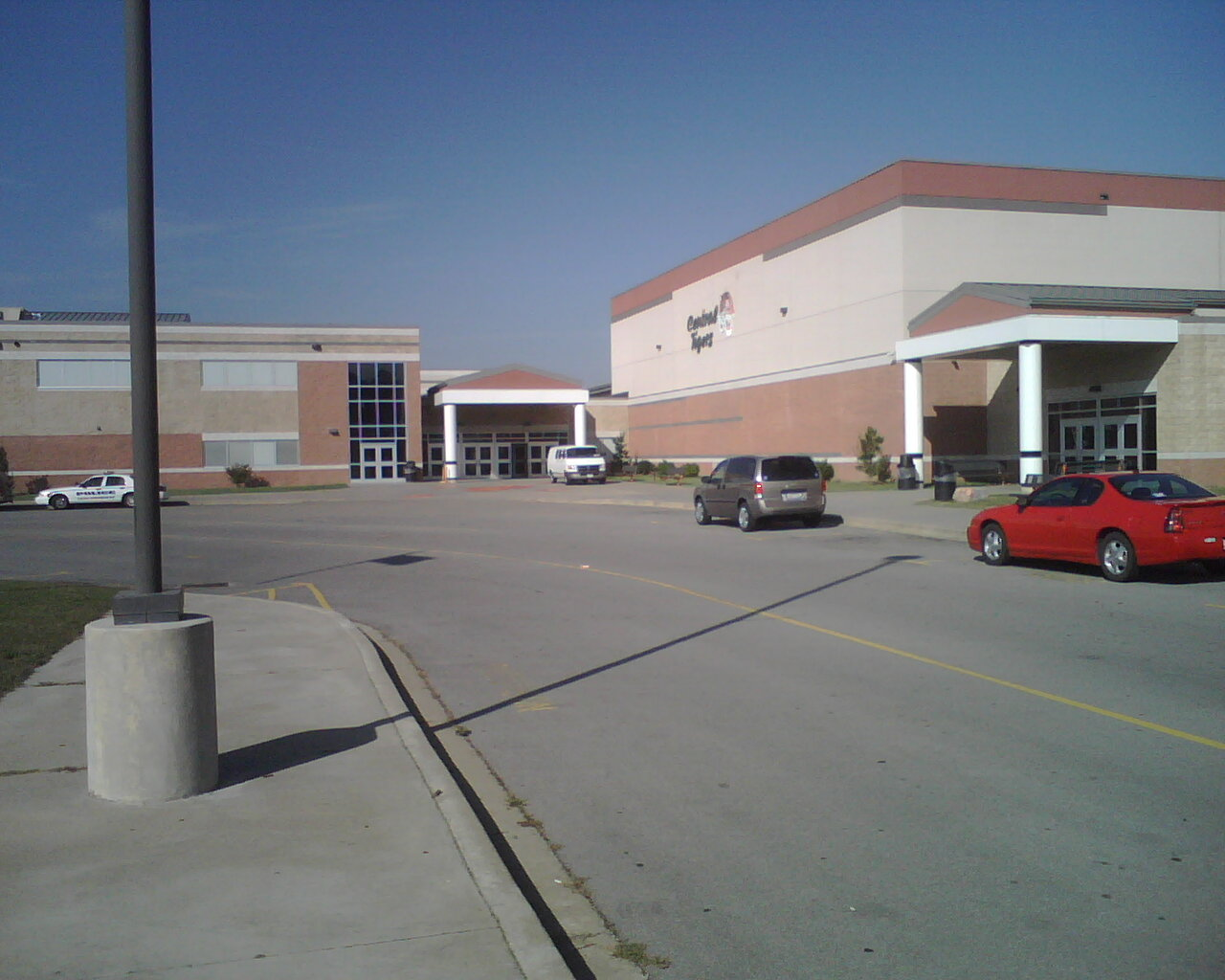
Cape Central High School

The majority of Cape Girardeau (in Cape Girardeau County) is in Cape Girardeau Public Schools.

- Alma Schrader Elementary
- Blanchard Elementary
- Clippard Elementary
- Franklin Elementary
- Jefferson Elementary
- Central Middle School
- Central Junior High School
- Central Senior High School
- Career and Technology Center
- Alternative Education Center

A portion in Cape Girardeau County is in the Jackson R-II School District.

Most of Cape Girardeau in Scott County is in the Scott City R-I School District, while a very small section is in Kelso C-7 School District.

=== Private schools ===
- Notre Dame High School
- Trinity Lutheran School
- Eagle Ridge Christian School
- Prodigy Leadership Academy
- St Mark Lutheran Preschool
- St. Mary's Cathedral School
- St. Vincent De Paul Grade School
- Lynwood Christian Academy

=== Colleges ===
- Cape Girardeau Partnership for Higher Education
- Metro Business College
- Southeast Missouri State University
- Southeast Hospital College of Nursing & Health Sciences
- Eclipse School-Cosmetology
- Trend Setters-Cosmetology Inc

=== Public library ===
The city has one public library: the Municipal Library District of the City of Cape Girardeau.

== Media ==
=== Print ===
The main print outlet is the regional daily newspaper the Southeast Missourian, which is owned by Rust Communications.

=== Television ===
CBS affiliate KFVS-TV (channel 12) is based in Cape Girardeau and is the main television source for news and information. Other sources include Fox affiliate KBSI (channel 23; also based in Cape Girardeau), Paducah-based NBC affiliate WPSD-TV (channel 6), and Carterville-based ABC affiliate WSIL-TV (channel 3).

== Transportation ==
In 1995, the City of Cape Girardeau established a Transportation Trust Fund that implemented a 0.5% local sales tax. All of that money is used on transportation improvement projects. General projects are also included to keep the city's streets in good condition. Cape Girardeau residents have voted numerous times to renew the tax, most recently in 2025.

On June 15, 2000, the Cape Girardeau County Commission passed Resolution 00–06, which formed the Cape Girardeau County Transportation Commission. The CGCTA now offers transportation to the citizens of Cape Girardeau County. The services that the CGCTA offer are primarily buses and taxis

In 2011, Cape Girardeau launched the Ride the City campaign. This dedicated 16 miles of bicycle lanes in city streets. There are lanes that are used only by bicycles and lanes where motor vehicles and bicycles can share space.

=== Public transit ===
Buses are offered to the citizens by the Cape Transit Authority and have several stops throughout the city. A general admission is $2, senior citizens are $1, and children ages 6 and under are free. Special pick-ups can be made to those who are disabled and live within three-fourths of mile from a designated stop. The Cape Girardeau County Transit Authority handles the city's bus and taxi service. Greyhound buses are also available for long-distance transit.

=== Air ===
The city owns the Cape Girardeau Regional Airport, a full-service airport that offers flights to and from Dallas Fort Worth International Airport in the Dallas–Fort Worth metroplex and O'Hare International Airport in Chicago.

== In popular culture ==
- Scenes for the film Gone Girl (2014), which is set in the fictional North Carthage, Missouri, were shot in Cape Girardeau.
- The traditional folk song, "Hang Me, Oh Hang Me", most notably arranged by Dave Van Ronk, features a singer who has traveled the world, specifically mentioning visiting Cape Girardeau. The song was featured in the 2013 film Inside Llewyn Davis, being performed by Oscar Isaac twice in the movie.
- The Glenn House, a historical building in downtown Cape Girardeau that is said to be haunted, was featured on a second-season episode of A&E's Ghost Hunters.

== Notable people ==
- Jacob M. Appel, novelist, lived in Cape Girardeau (1982–1984), set several books in Cape Girardeau
- William F. Barnes, Former head football coach for UCLA
- Leon Brinkopf, shortstop in Major League Baseball for the Chicago Cubs in 1952 born and died in Cape Girardeau
- Joseph Cable, a Medal of Honor recipient during the American Indian Wars
- Shirley Crites, All-American Girls Professional Baseball League player
- Dale Dye, actor and retired U.S. Marine
- A.J. Ellis, former Major League Baseball catcher, born in Cape Girardeau
- John Thomson Faris, clergyman, born in Cape Girardeau
- Linda M. Godwin, scientist and former NASA astronaut
- Allene Wilson Groves (1896–1986), 23rd President General of the Daughters of the American Revolution
- Mary Hagan-Harrell, served in the Missouri House of Representatives, born in Cape Girardeau
- Chic Hecht, U.S. Senator from Nevada
- Andrew Conway Ivy, president of the American Physiological Society from 1939 to 1941
- Rod Jetton, former state of Missouri Speaker of the House
- Terry Jones, anti-Islamic right wing activist and fundamentalist pastor of Dove World Outreach Center
- Peter Kinder, 46th Lieutenant Governor of Missouri from 2005 to 2017
- Richard Kinder, businessman and co-founder and executive chairman of Kinder Morgan, Inc.
- The Limbaugh family, including political commentators, brothers David and Rush Limbaugh
- Mark Littell, Major League Baseball pitcher for the Kansas City Royals and the St. Louis Cardinals
- James Naile, Major League Baseball pitcher for the St. Louis Cardinals
- Roger Mosby, 14th Chief Scout Executive of the Boy Scouts of America
- Stephanie O'Sullivan, Principal Deputy Director of National Intelligence, born in Cape Girardeau
- Susan Beth Scott, 2008 and 2012 U.S. Paralympic medalist swimmer
- John Locke Scripps, journalist and biographer
- Tony Spinner, guitarist and singer
- Jess Stacy, jazz pianist
- Jeffrey Alexander Sterling, lawyer and former CIA employee
- William S. Stone, former superintendent of the U.S. Air Force Academy
- Billy Swan, singer who had a #1 hit song named "I Can Help" in 1974
- Terry Teachout, writer
- Elam Vangilder, Major League Baseball pitcher for the St. Louis Browns and the Detroit Tigers
- Robert Henry Whitelaw, U.S. Congressman
