= Riverfront Park of Cape Girardeau Missouri =

The Cape Girardeau Missouri River Front Park in Cape Girardeau, Missouri is located in front of the levee wall that protects the town from high water of the Mississippi River. The park has a stepped concrete seating platform that allows viewing of the river by visitors.

Along with the visitor viewing platform, it has docking facilities for riverboats such as the Delta Queen that travels between St. Louis and New Orleans. Two levee gates that can be closed during high water are the entries to the park. Murals are painted on the wall, welcoming river visitors to the area.
