= Mississippi River Tales Mural =

Mural by Thomas Melvin in Cape Girardeau, Missouri

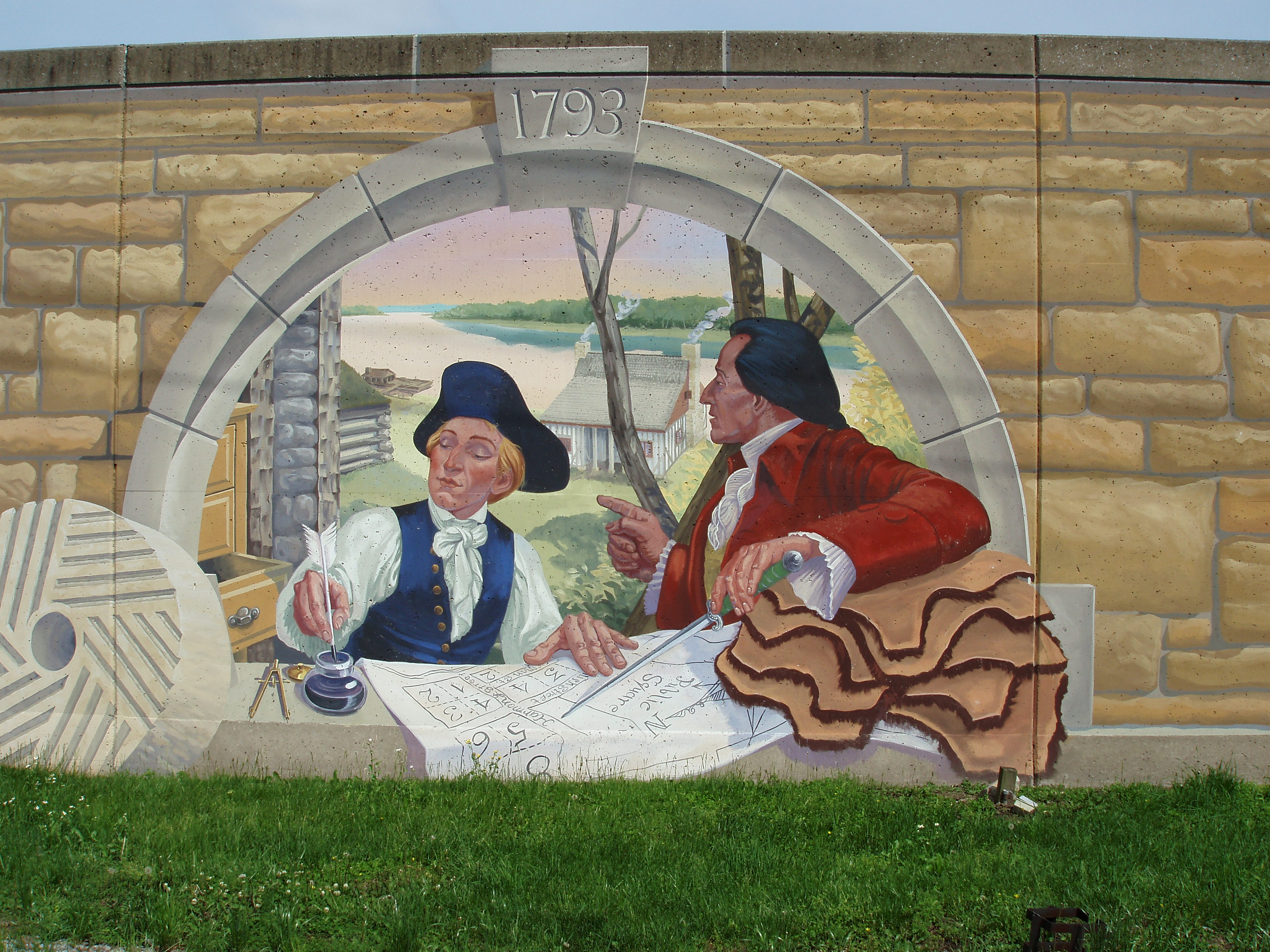
- Artist: Thomas Melvin
- Year: 2005
- Location: Cape Girardeau, Missouri, US
- Coordinates: 37°18′21″N 89°31′03″W

The Mississippi River Tales is a mural containing 24 panels covering nearly 18,000 square feet (1,700 m2) of the 15-foot (4.6 m)-high downtown floodwall in Cape Girardeau, Missouri. It illustrates the area's history, beginning with the Native Americans who inhabited it between 900 and 1200. Each panel tells a story: Louis Lorimier platting the city in 1793, the transfer of Upper Louisiana from France to the United States in 1804, Missouri gaining statehood in 1821, the coming of the railroad in 1880, the Big Freeze of 1918-19 and the completion of the Bill Emerson Memorial Bridge, among many others. The paintings are in a style similar to that of painter Thomas Hart Benton. (Pamela Selbert, Chicago Tribune, November 18, 2007). The mural was painted by Chicago artist Thomas Melvin, in collaboration with several local artists and was dedicated at a public ceremony on July 7, 2005.

== Panels ==
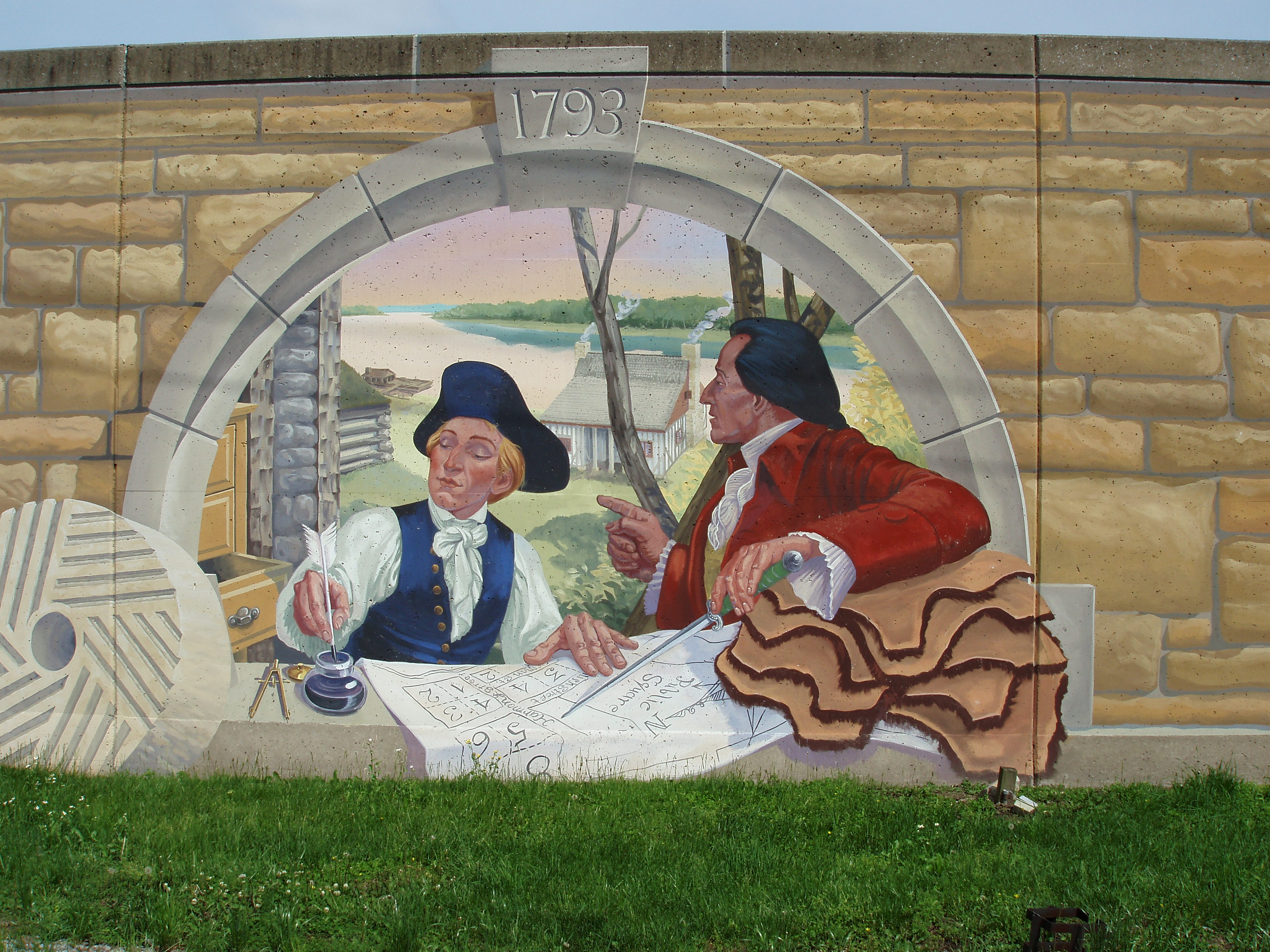
Planning a City

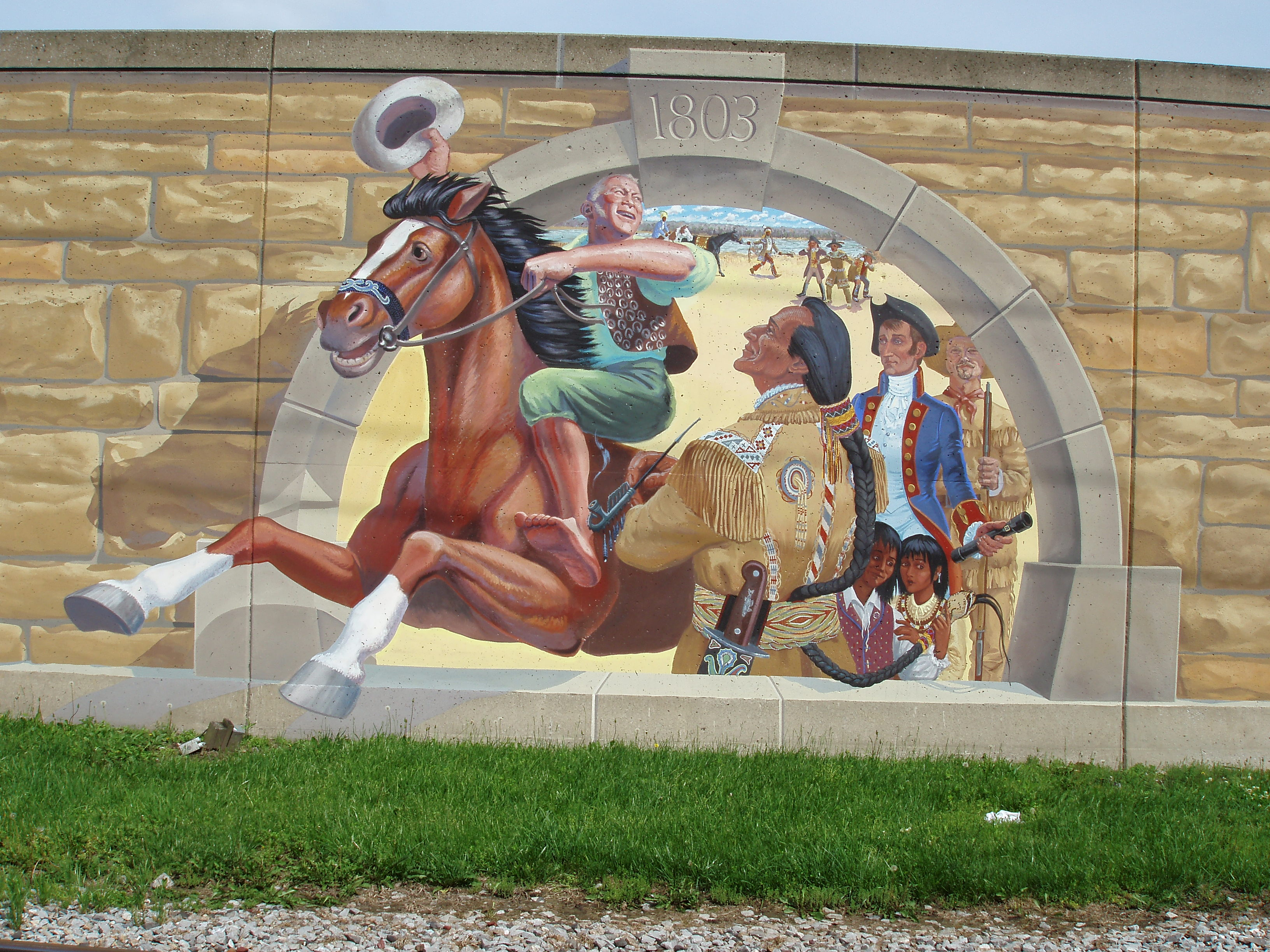
Lewis and Clark

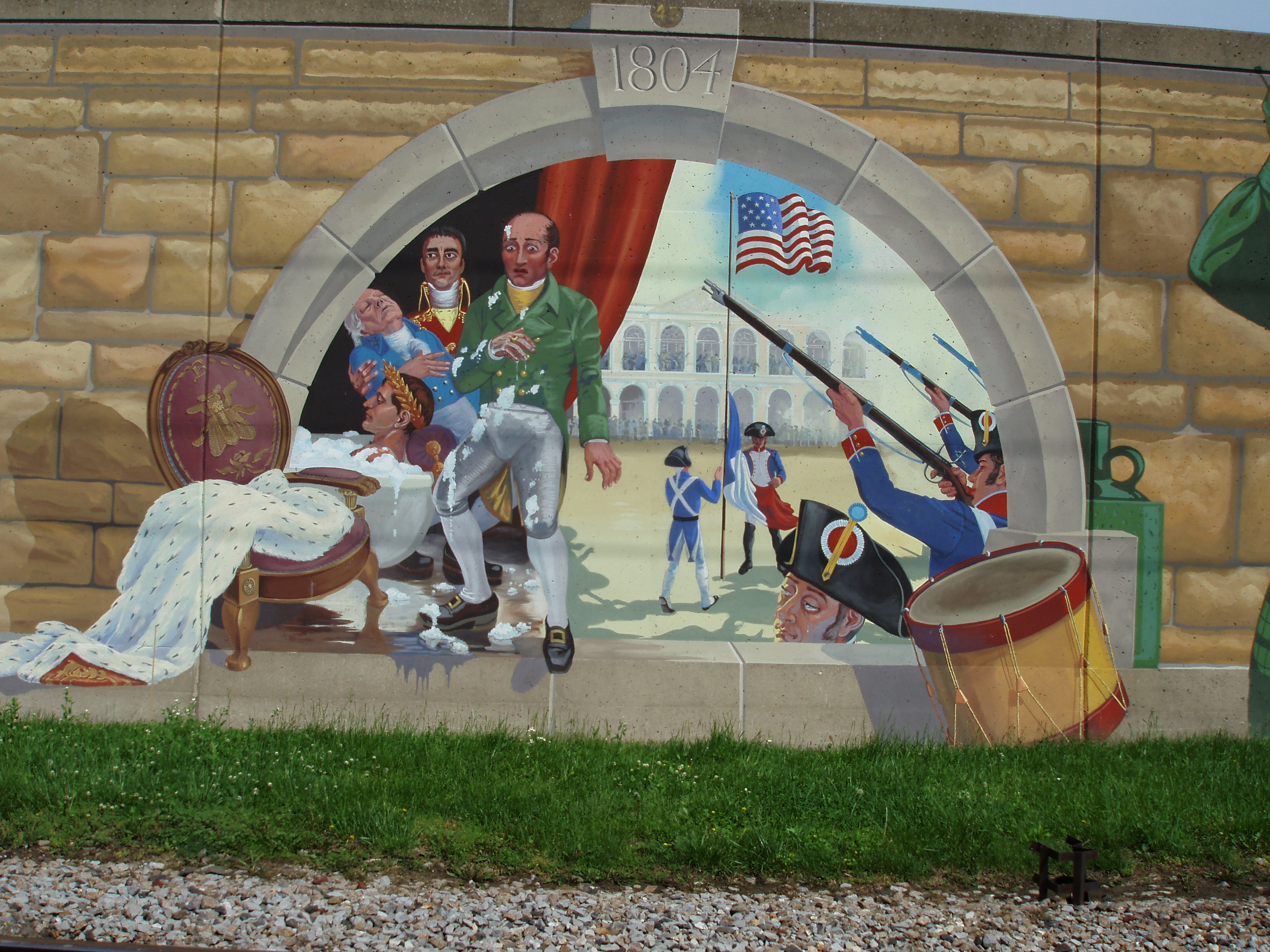
The Louisiana Purchase

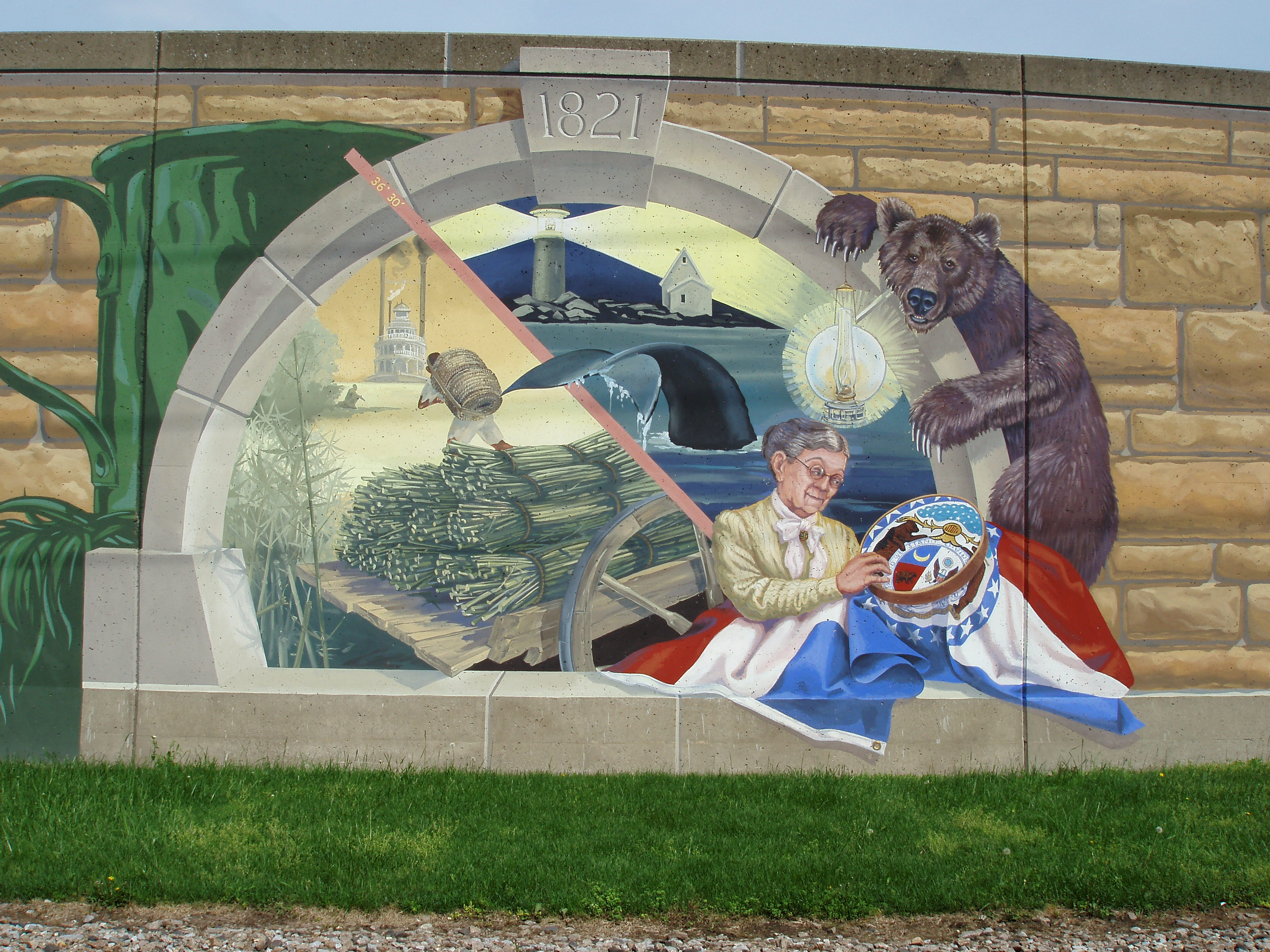
Missouri Statehood

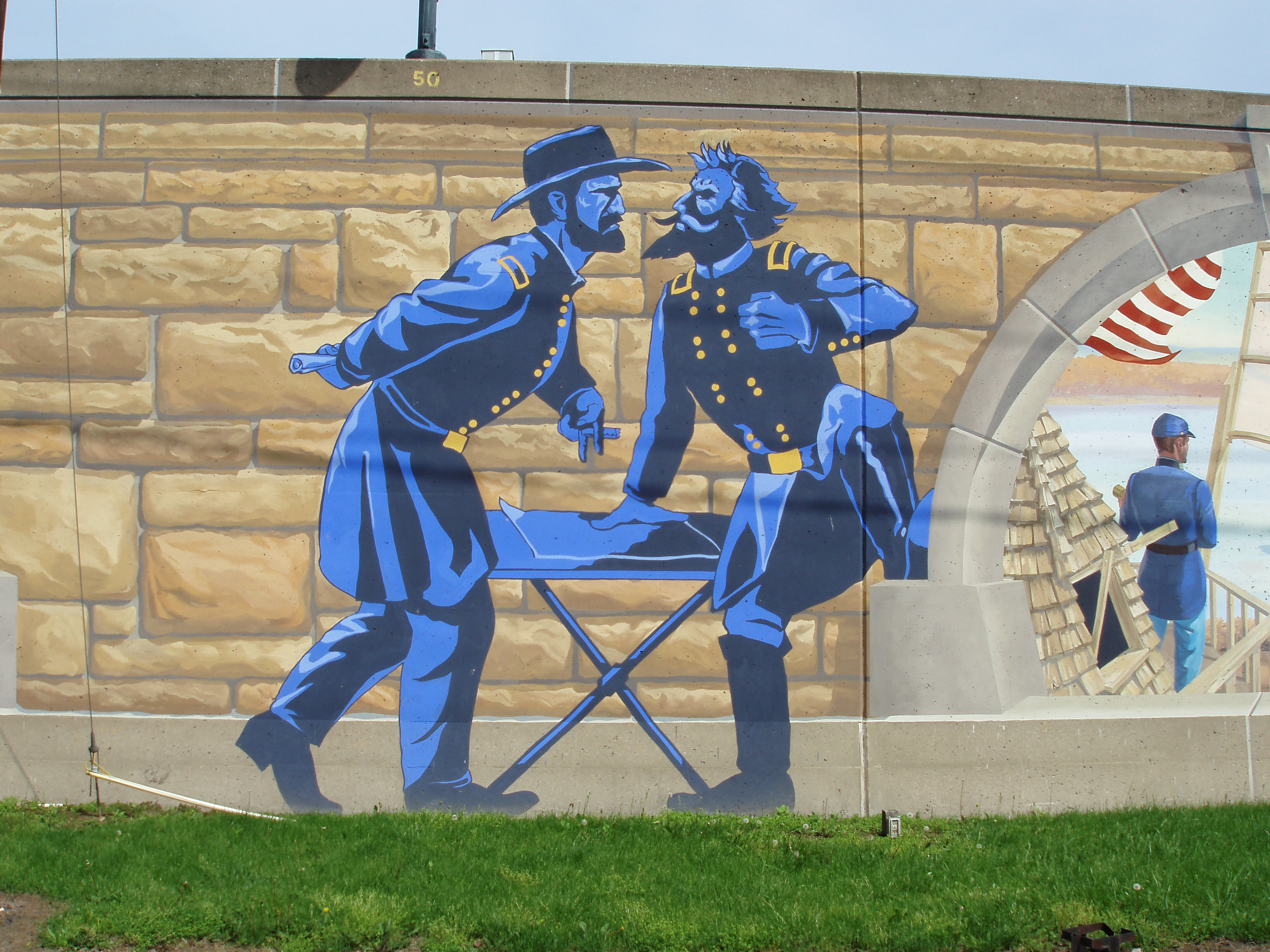
The Trail of Tears

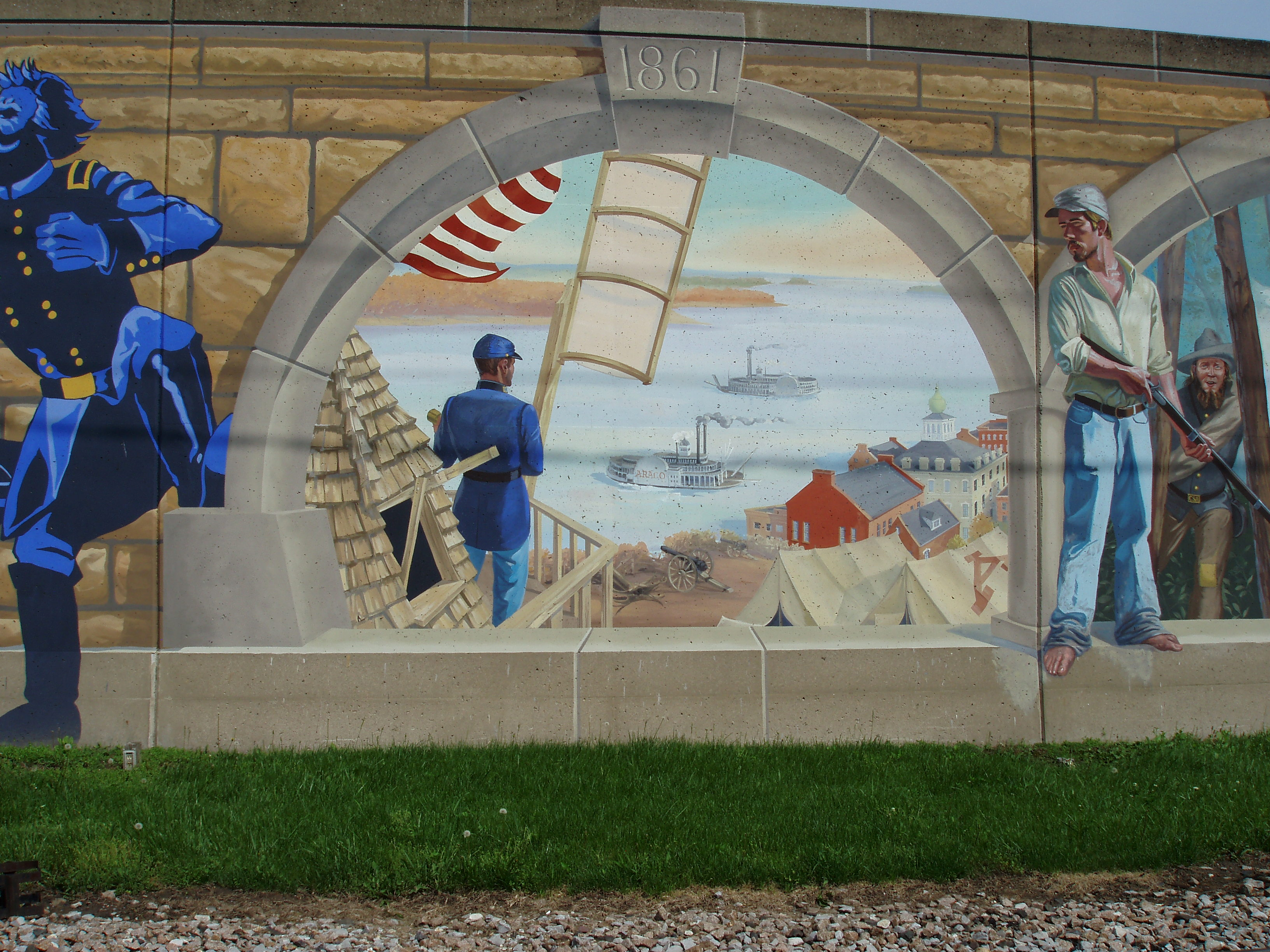
The Civil War

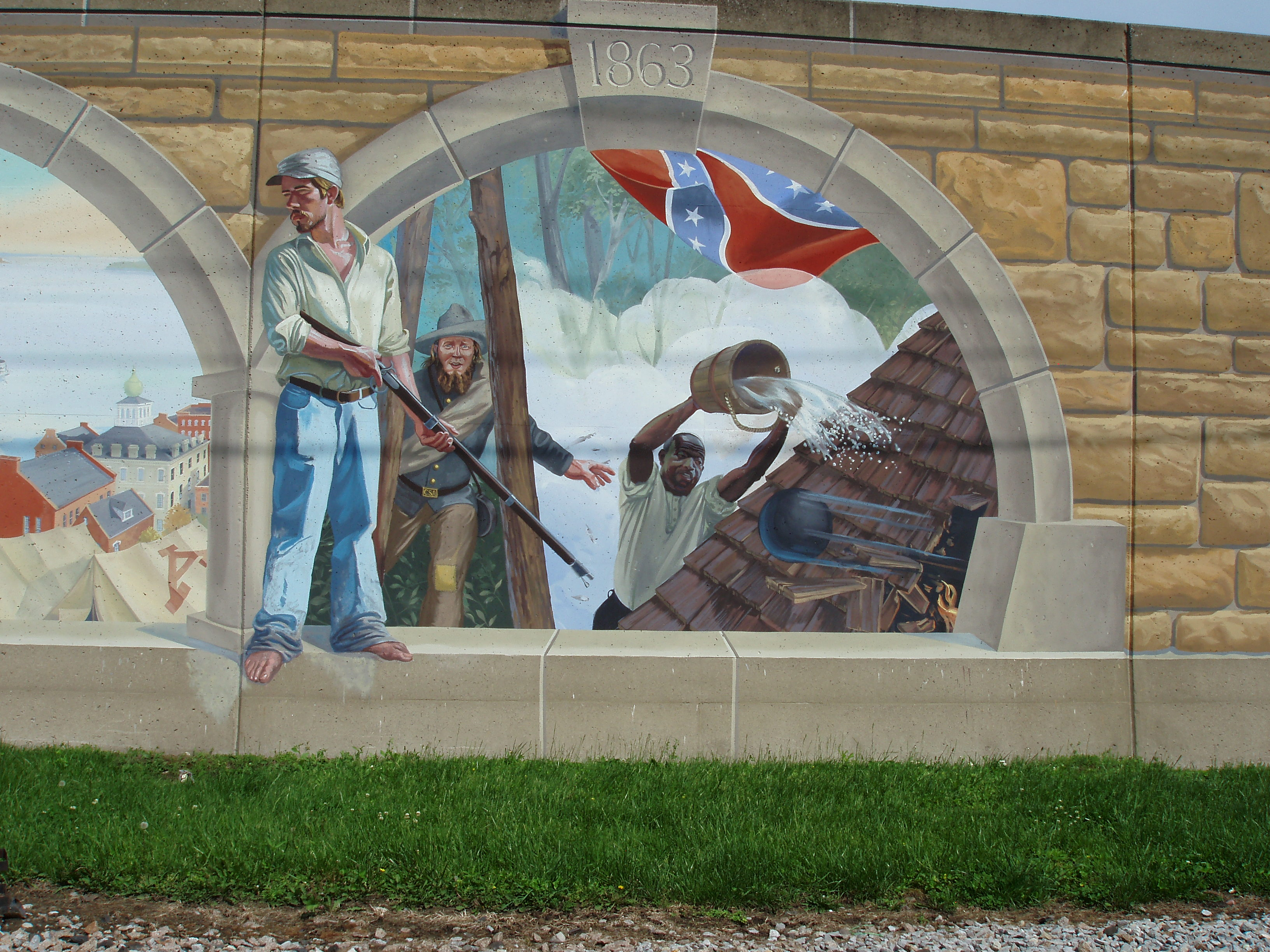
The Civil War

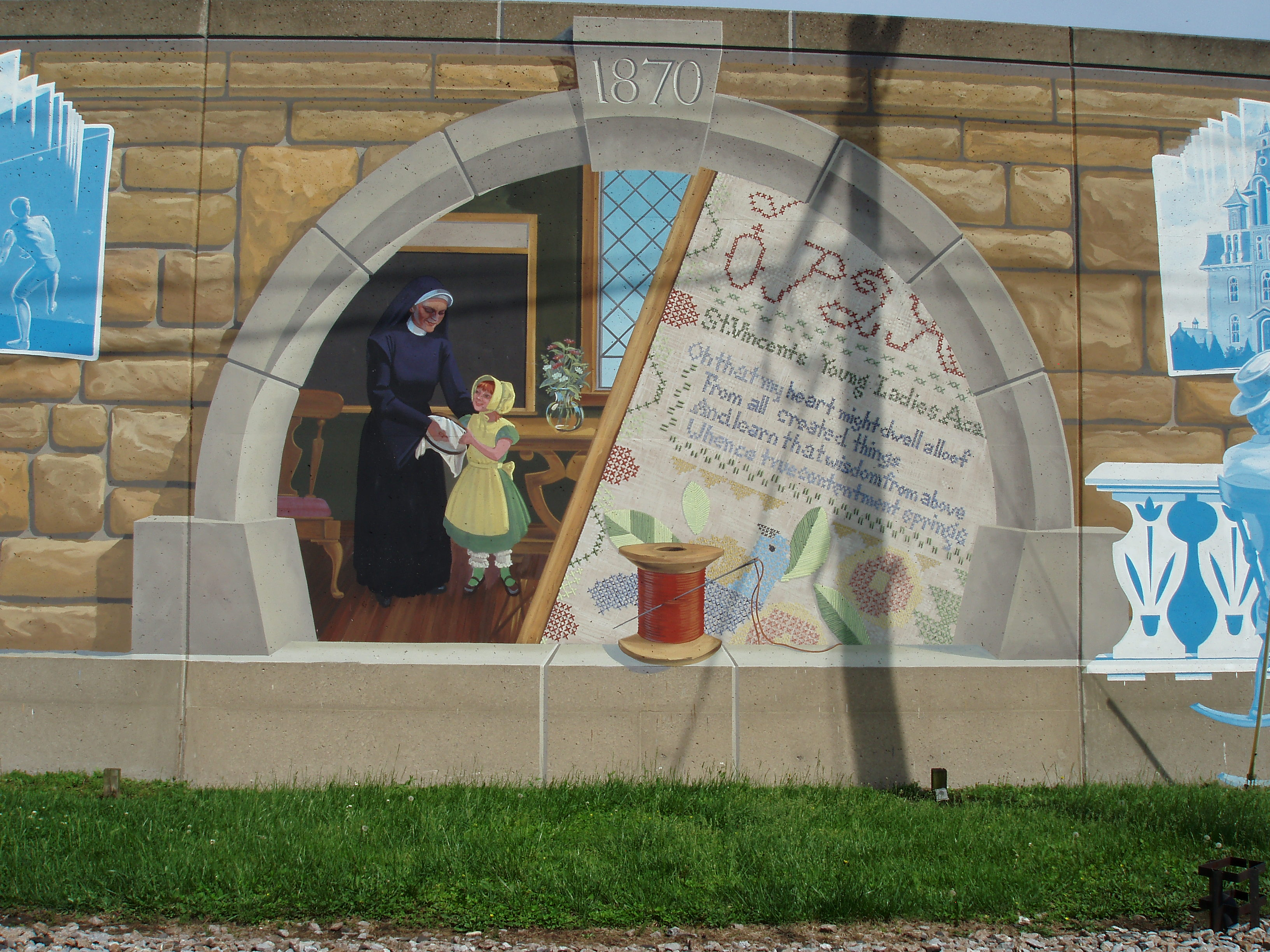
St. Vincent's Young Ladies' Academy

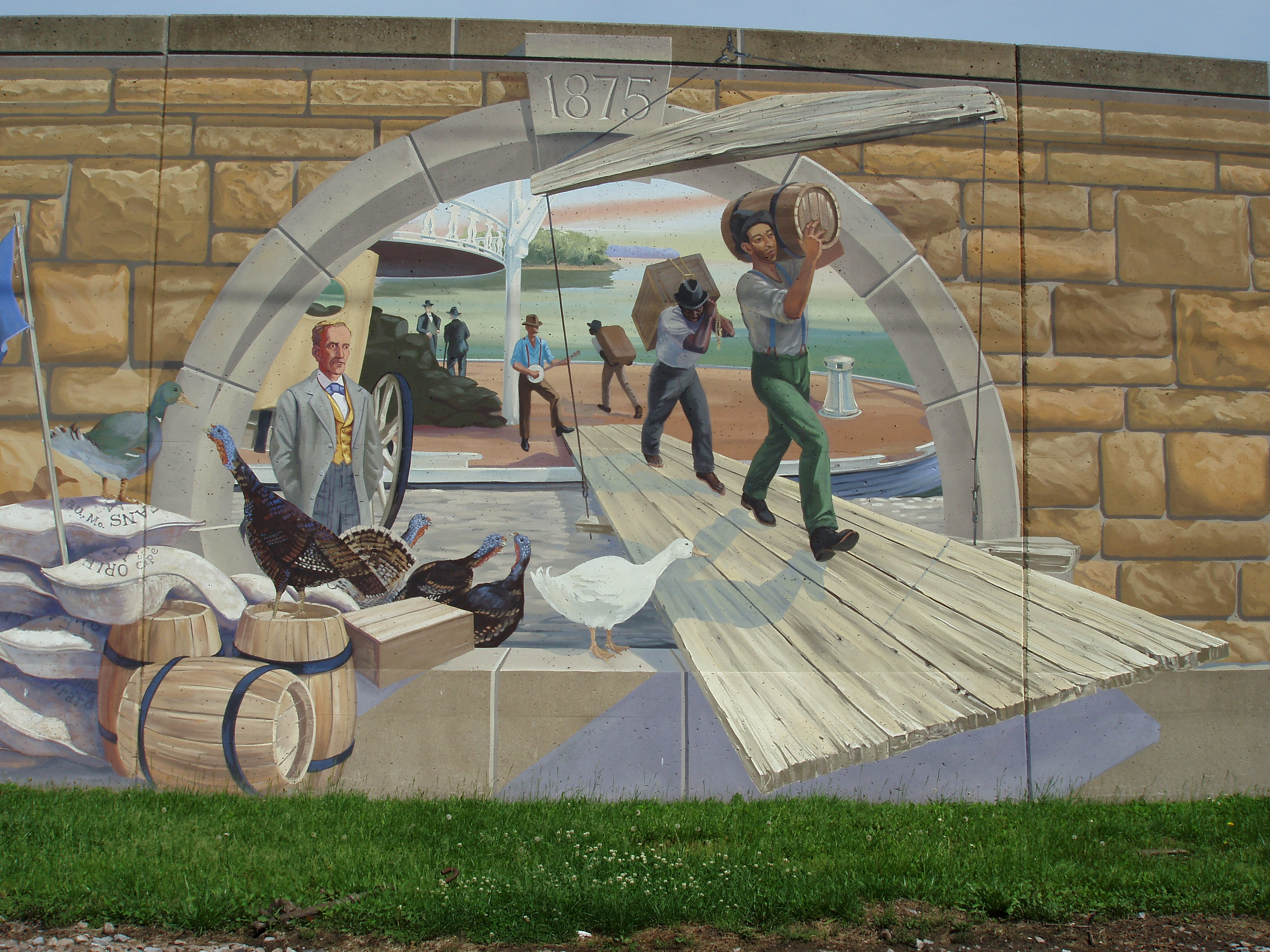
River Commerce

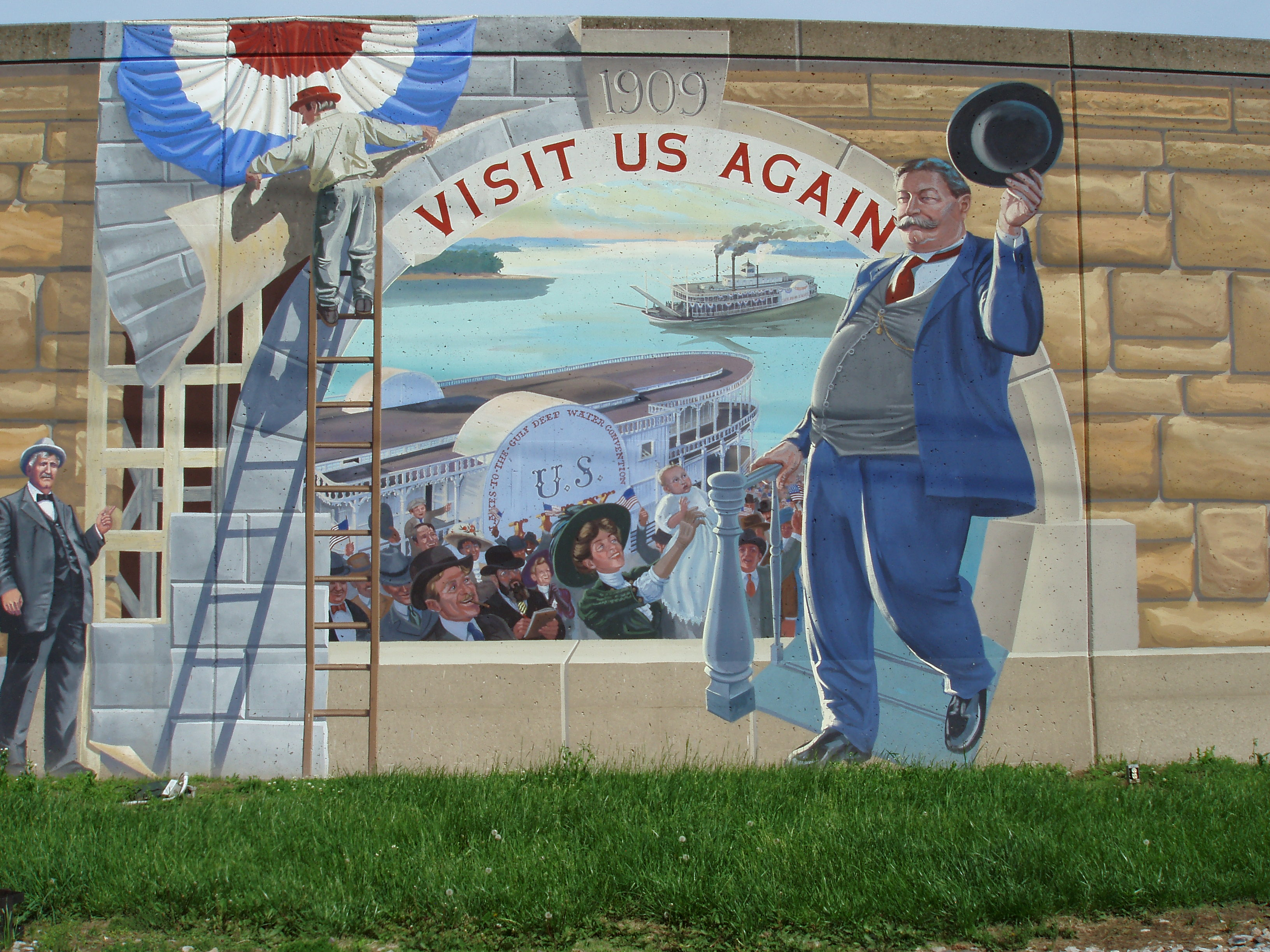
President Taft's Visit

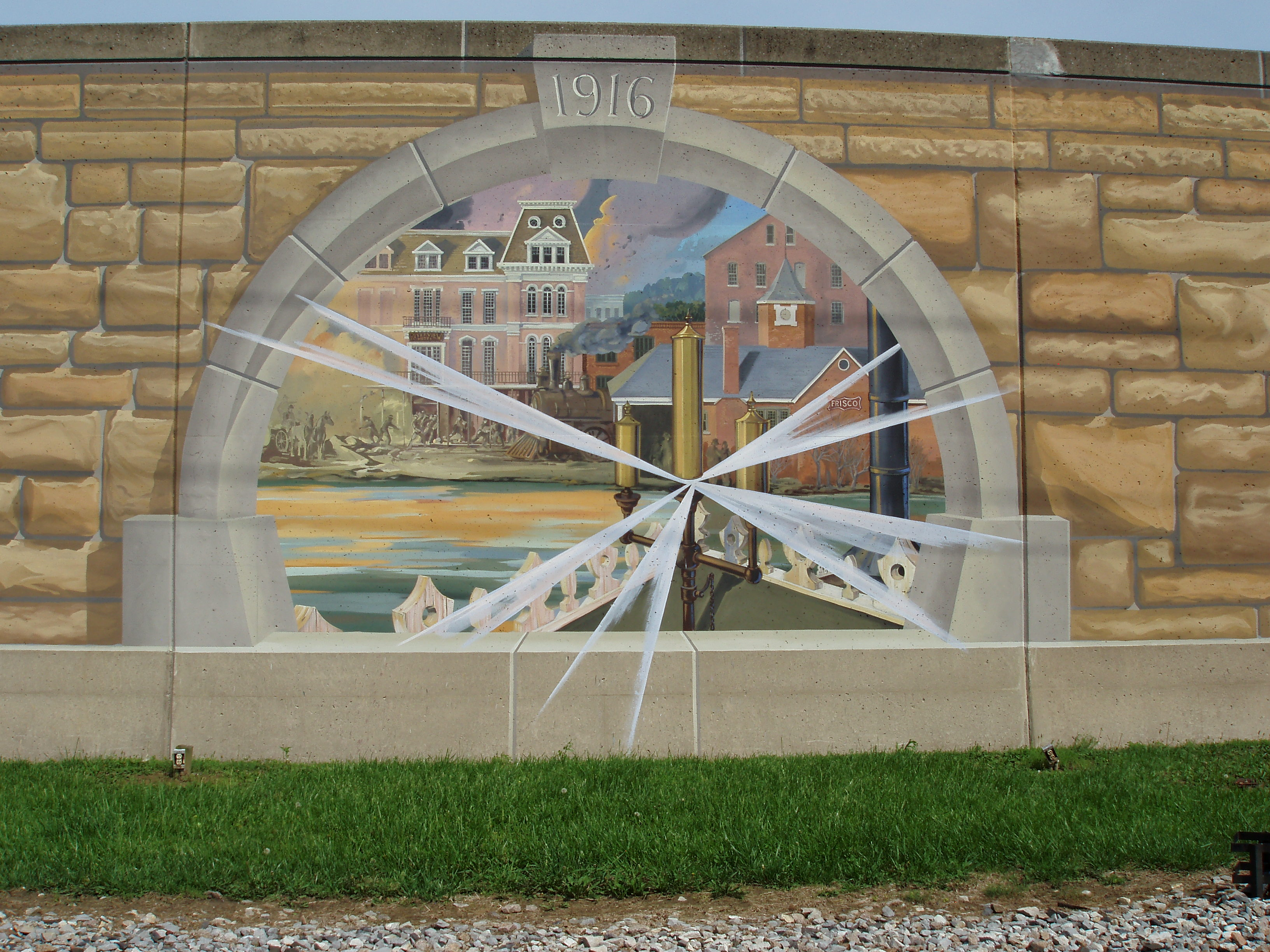
The Great Fire

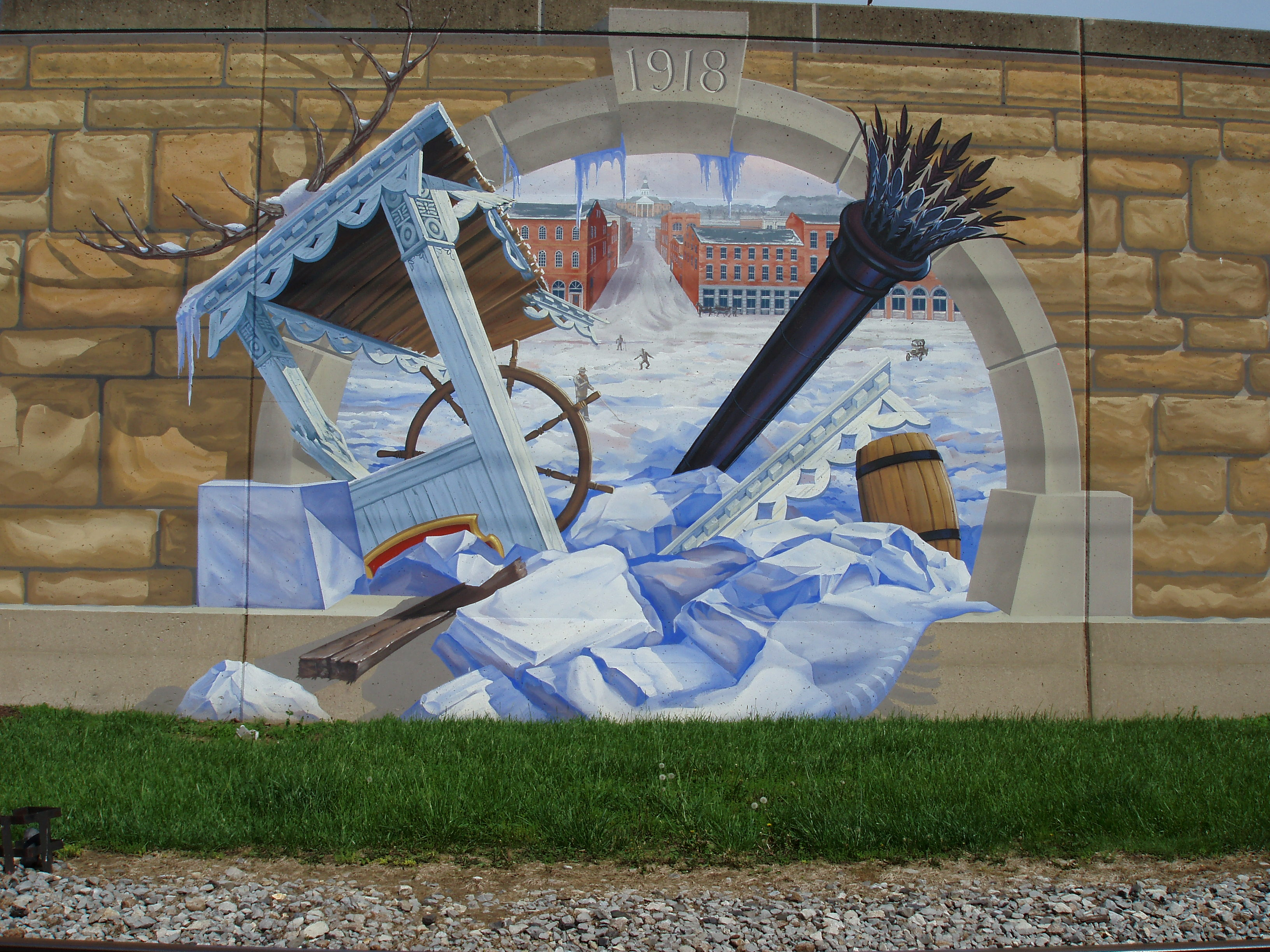
The Big Freeze

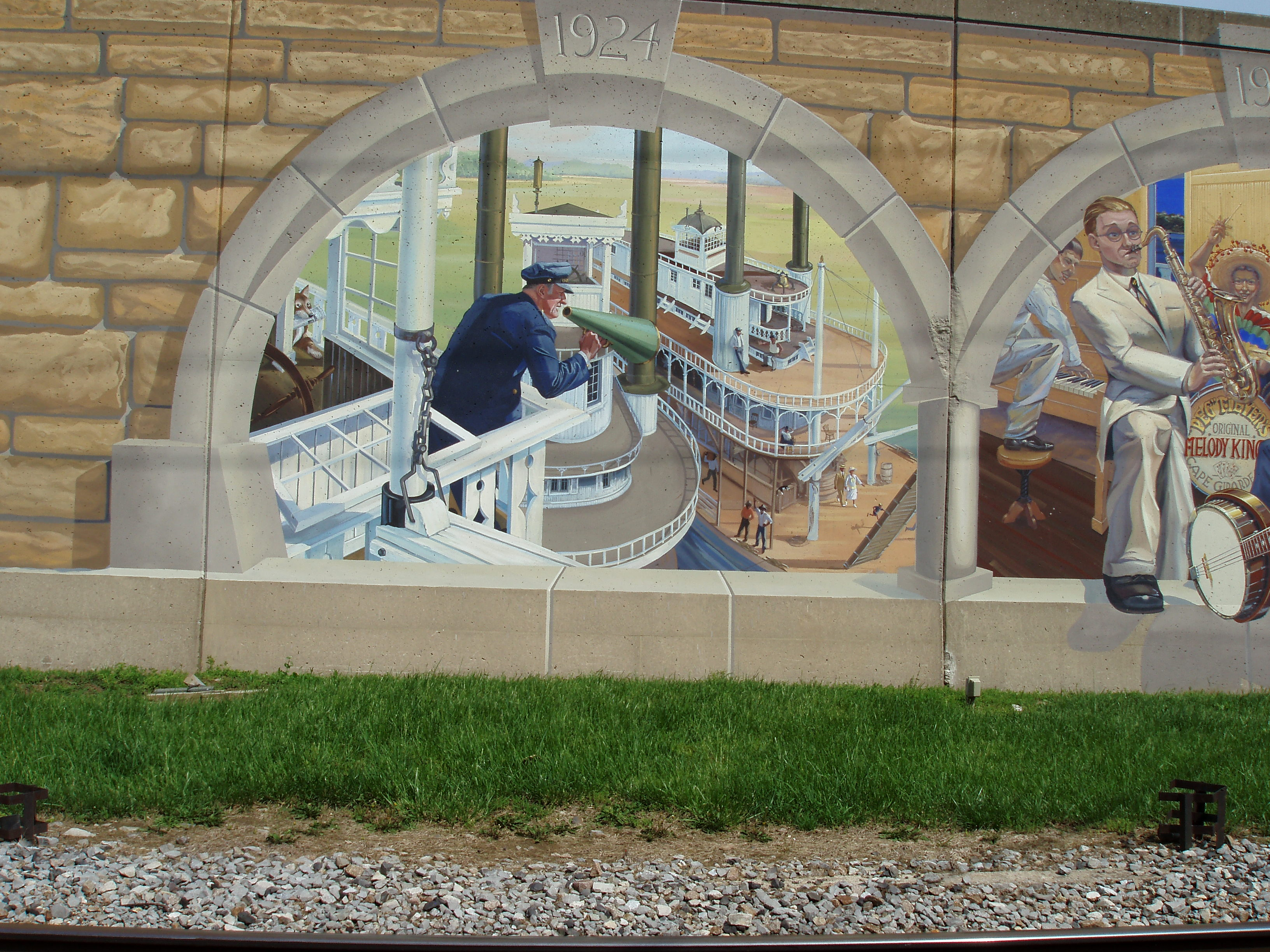
The Three "Cape Girardeaus"

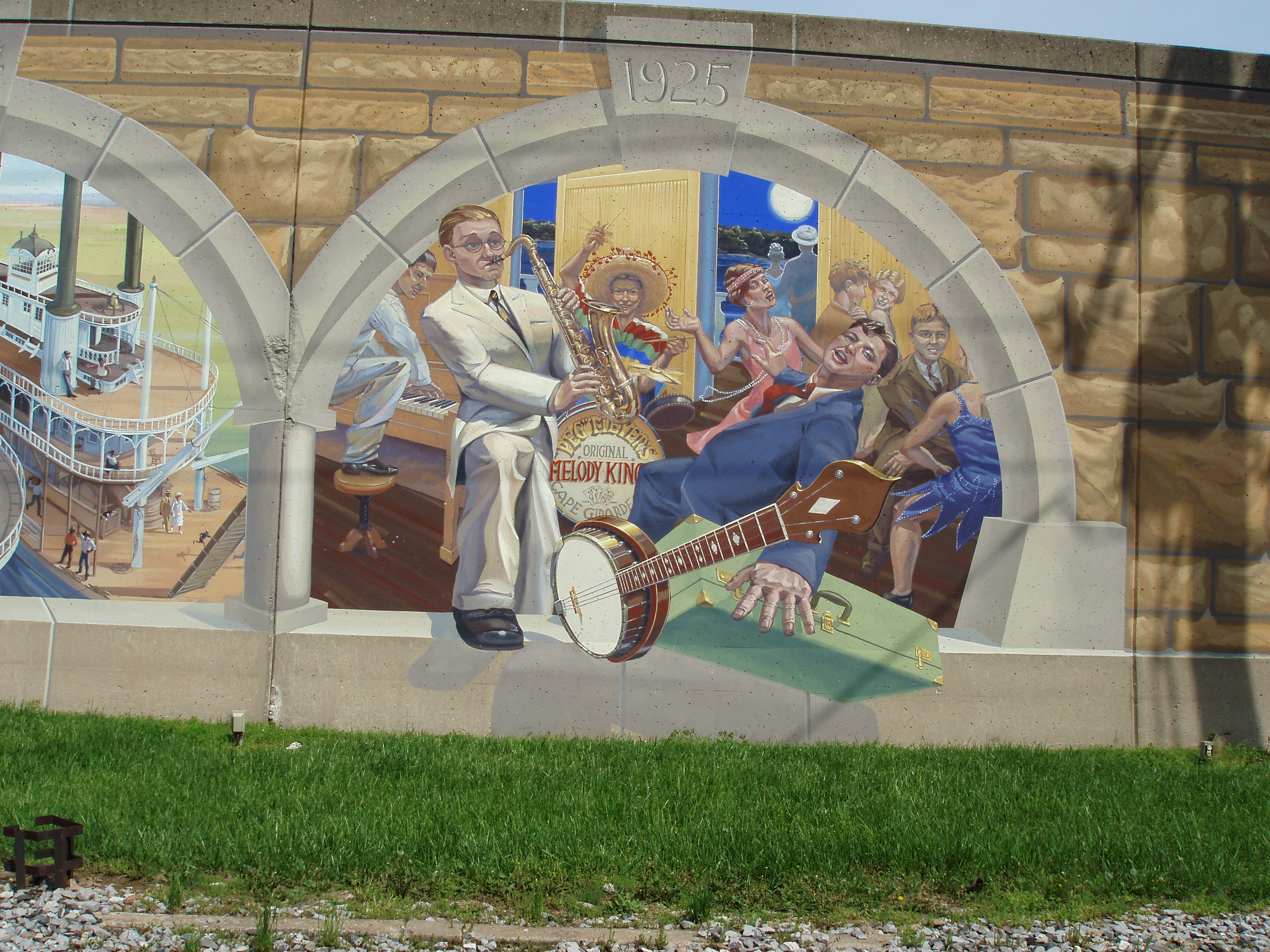
Riverboat Jazz

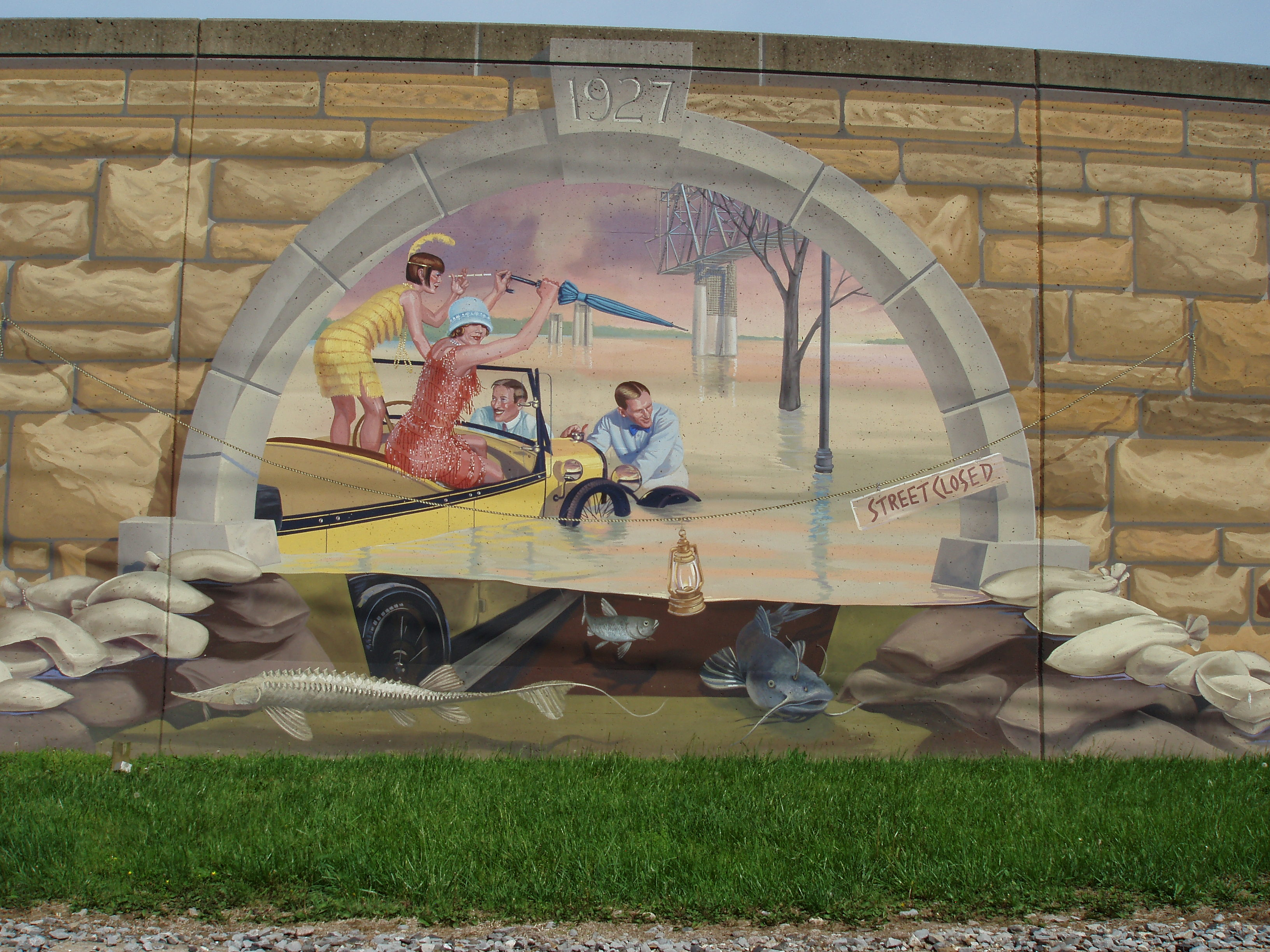
The Big Flood

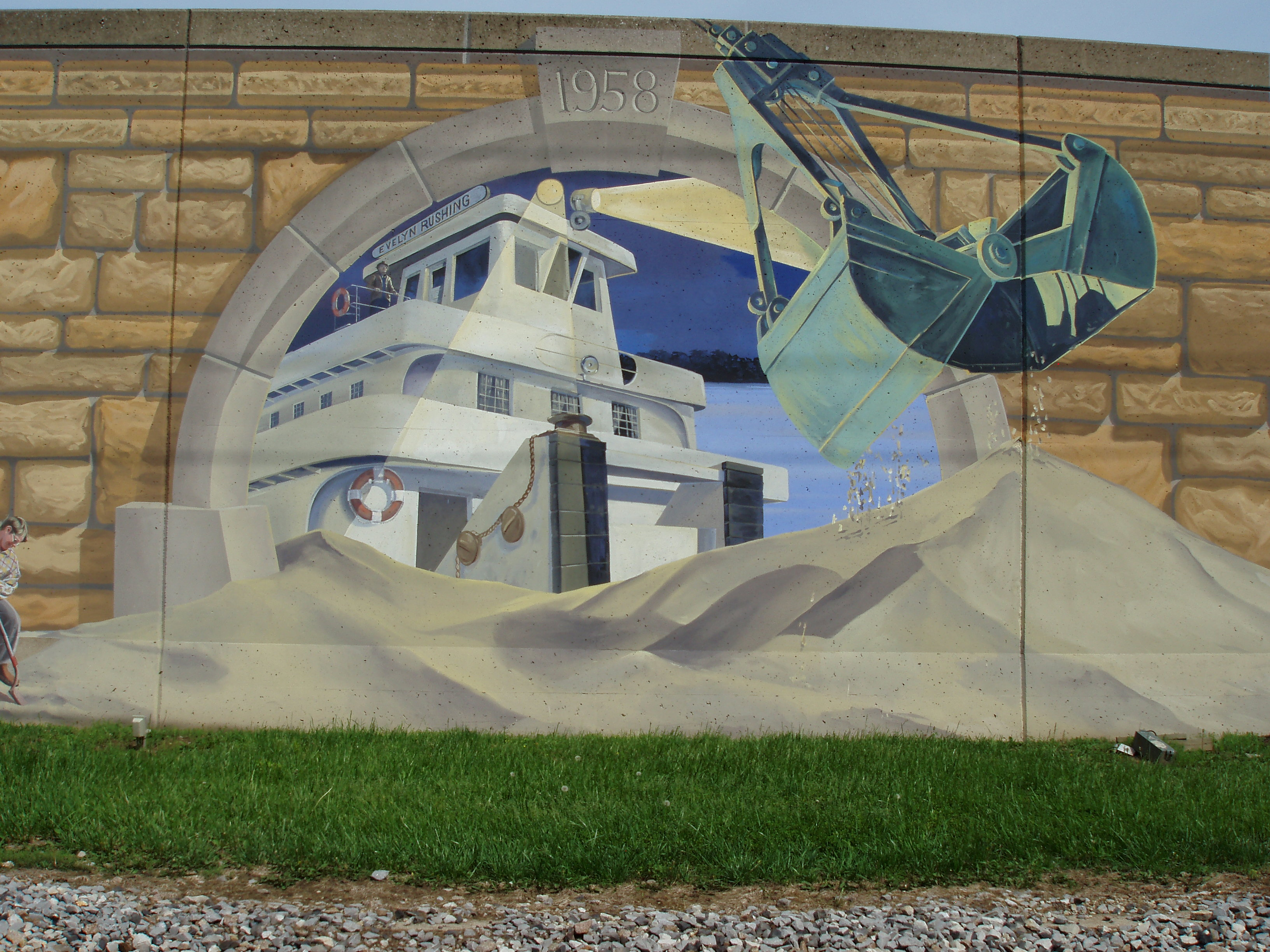
River Industry

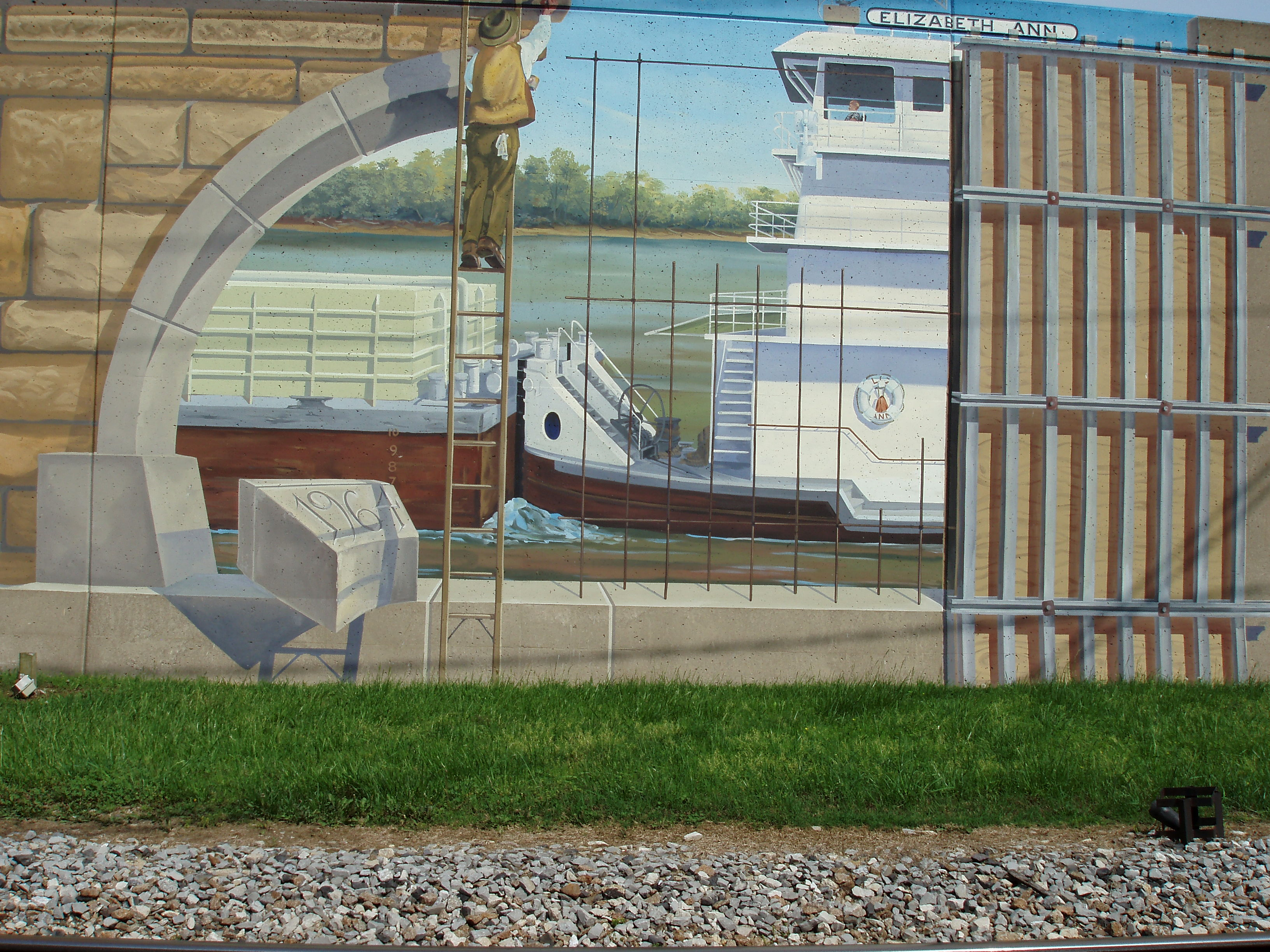
The Great Wall

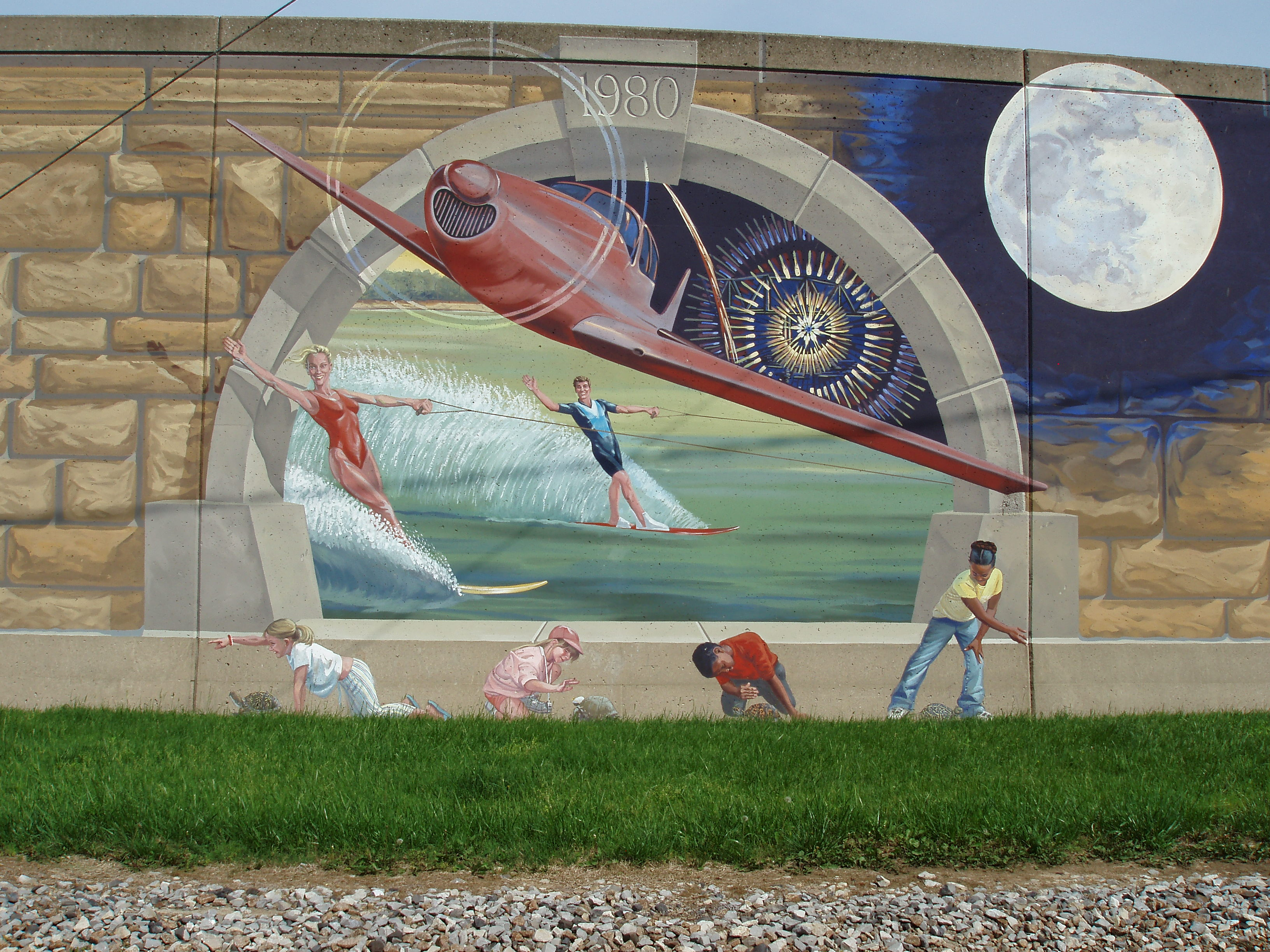
River Fest
