= Old Lorimier Cemetery =

Historic cemetery in Cape Gurardeau County, Missouri

- U.S. National Register of Historic Places
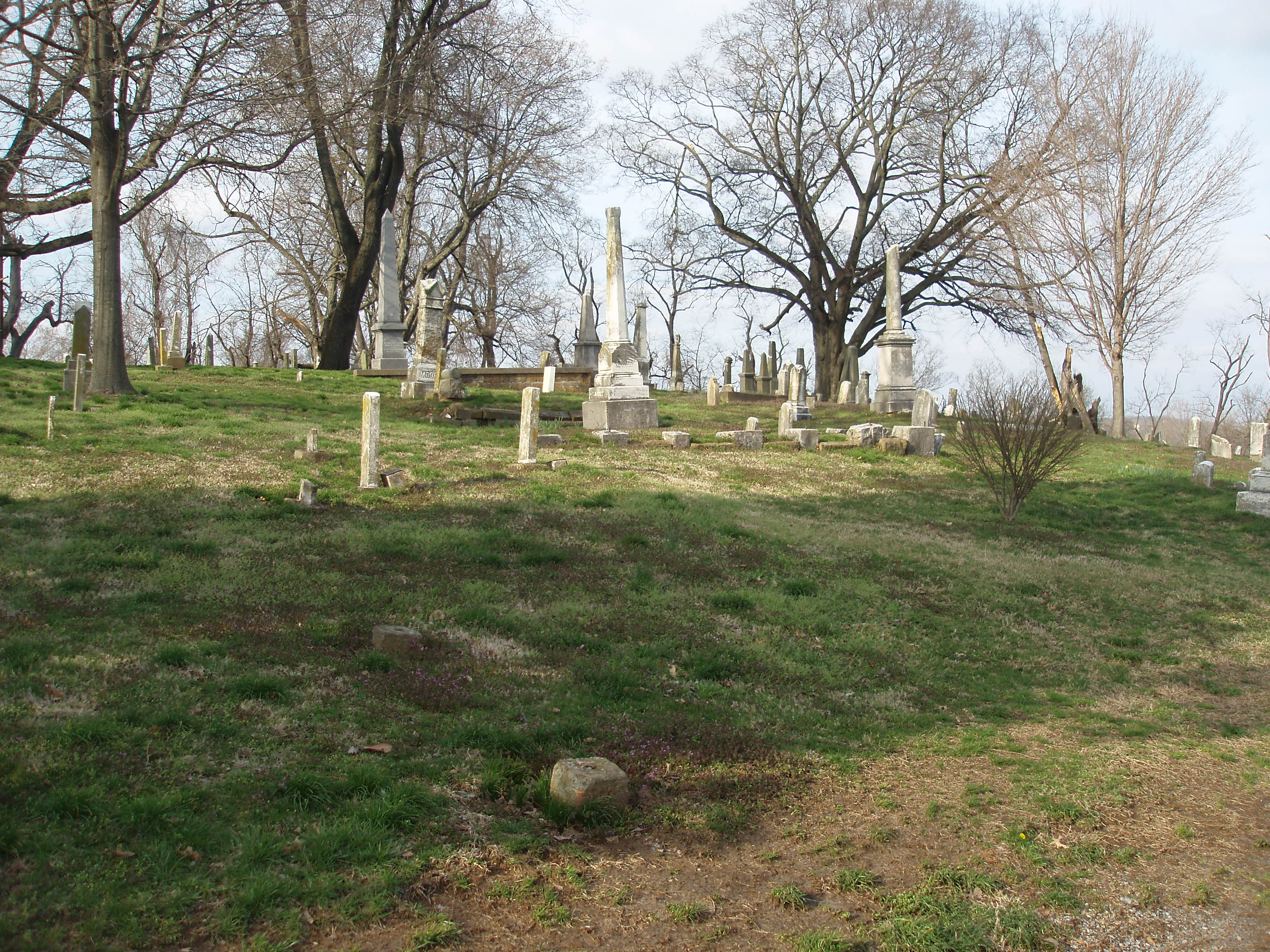

- Location within Missouri Location within the United States
- Location: 500 North Fountain Street, Cape Girardeau, Cape Girardeau County, Missouri
- Coordinates: 37°18′43″N 89°31′13″W
- Area: 5 acres (2.0 ha)
- Built: 1808
- NRHP reference No.: 05001091
- Added to NRHP: September 28, 2005

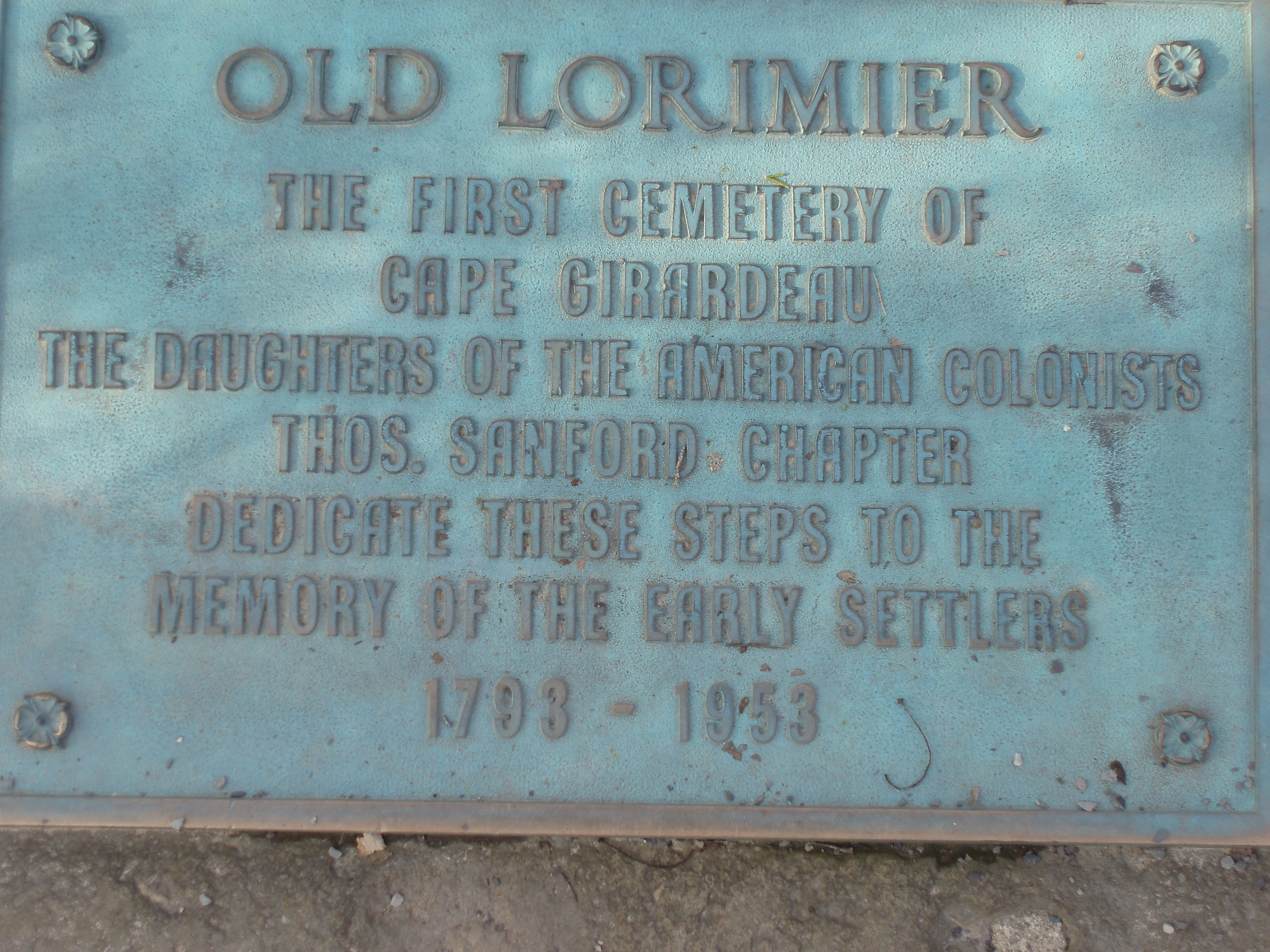
Dedicatory plaque at the Old Lorimier Cemetery

The Old Lorimier Cemetery in Cape Girardeau, Missouri was established between 1806 and 1808 by Louis Lorimier. The cemetery is located at 500 North Fountain Street overlooking the Mississippi River. There are believed to be more than 6,500 graves in the cemetery, most of them unmarked. A sidewalk serves as a north – south dividing line in the cemetery. It is said that Catholics are buried on the south and Protestants are buried on the north. The east slope is believed to be the burial grounds of African-American persons. It has been recorded that as many as 1,200 soldiers from the Civil War were buried there. The grave marker for the wife of Louis Lorimier says "The Noblest Matron of the Shawnee race."

It was listed on the National Register of Historic Places in 2005.
