= Marquette Hotel =

Marquette Hotel may refer to:

- Pere Marquette Hotel, Peoria, Illinois, listed on the NRHP in Illinois
- Marquette Hotel (Minneapolis, Minnesota), located in the IDS Center on Marquette Avenue
- Marquette Hotel (Cape Girardeau, Missouri), listed on the NRHP in Missouri
- Marquette Hotel (Springfield, Missouri), listed on the NRHP in Greene County, Missouri
- Marquette Hotel (St. Louis, Missouri), listed on the NRHP in St. Louis, Missouri
- Marquette Hotel (Memphis, Tennessee), an early name of the Lorraine Motel where Martin Luther King was assassinated, now the National Civil Rights Museum
