= Hamilton Place =

Hamilton Place may refer to:

- FirstOntario Concert Hall (formerly Hamilton Place Theatre), Hamilton, Ontario
- Hamilton Place, London, a street with its origins in the 1660s
- Hamilton Place, Singapore, a road within Seletar Aerospace Park
- Hamilton Place (Columbia, Tennessee), listed on the National Register of Historic Places (NRHP)
- Hamilton Place (shopping mall), Chattanooga, Tennessee
- Hamilton Place (Sylacauga, Alabama), NRHP-listed
- Hamilton Place within Hamilton Place Historic District, St. Louis, Missouri, NRHP-listed
- Alexander Hamilton Place, Washington, DC, at the south facade of the U.S. Treasury Building
