= Barnett, Haynes & Barnett =

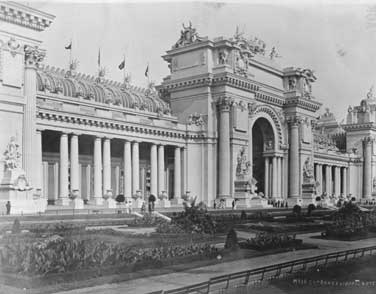
Palace of Liberal Arts, Louisiana Purchase Exposition, 1904

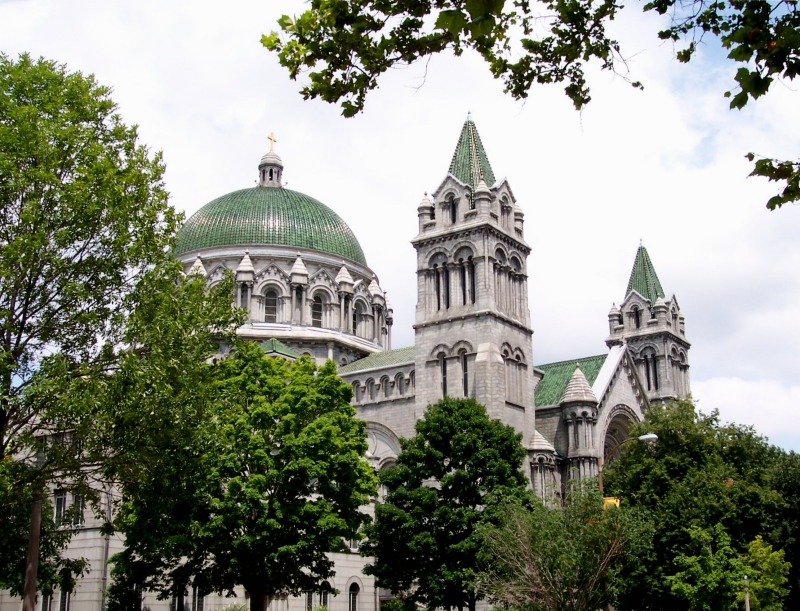
Cathedral Basilica of St. Louis, 1912

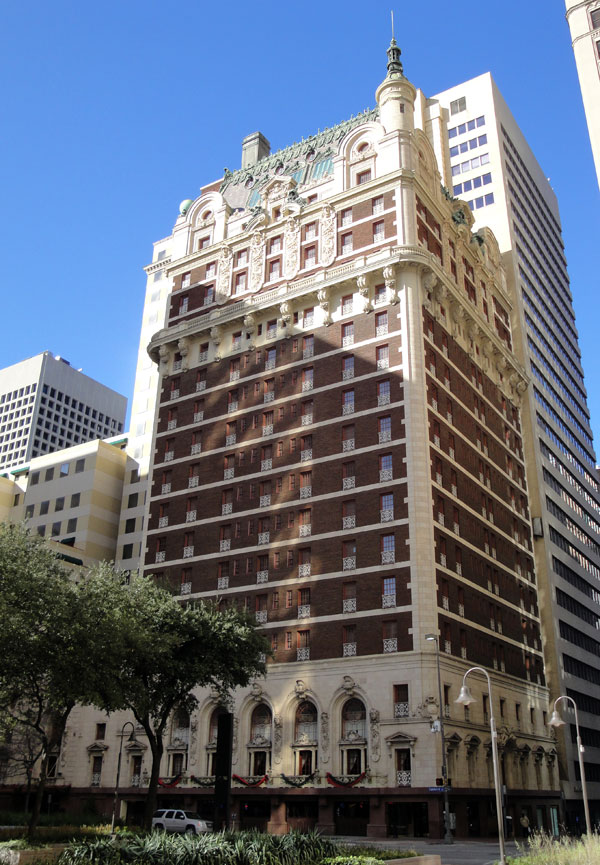
Adolphus Hotel, Dallas, Texas, 1912

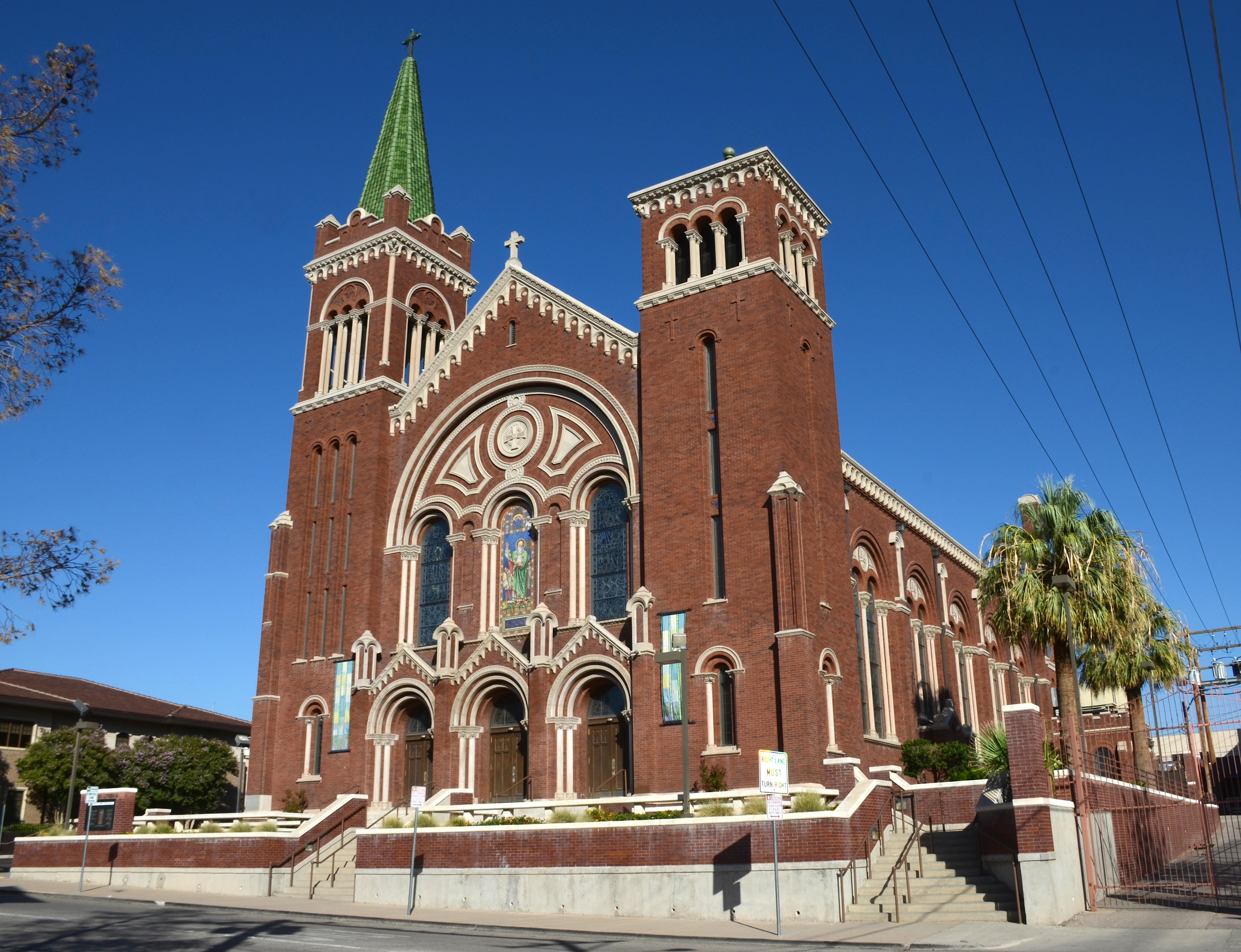
Cathedral of St Patrick, El Paso, Texas, 1916

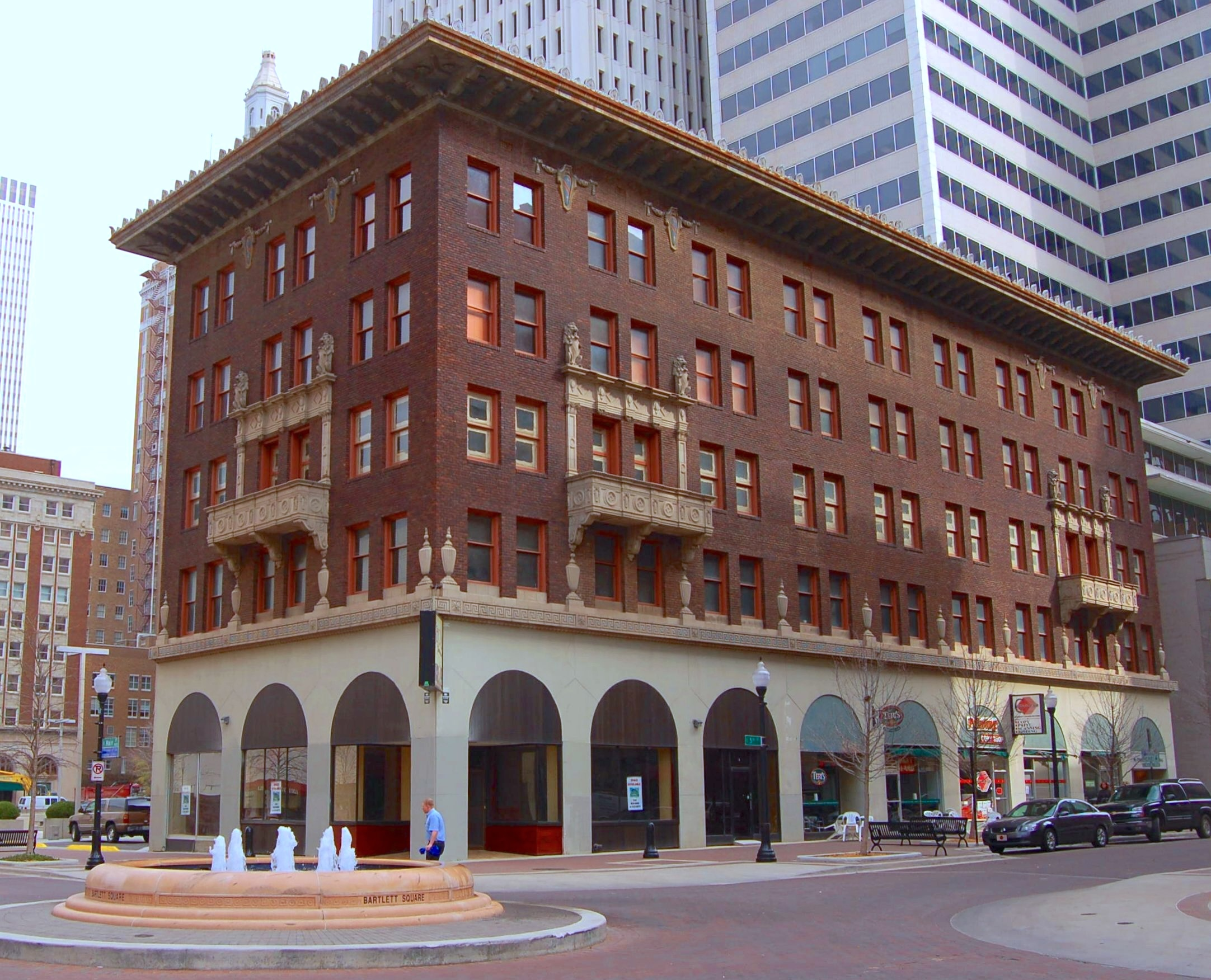
McFarlin Building, Tulsa, OK

Barnett, Haynes & Barnett was a prominent architectural firm based in St. Louis, Missouri. Their credits include many familiar St. Louis landmarks, especially a number related to the local Catholic church. Their best-known building is probably the Cathedral Basilica of St. Louis (the 'new' cathedral). A number of the firm's works are listed on the U.S. National Register of Historic Places.

The three partners were Thomas P. Barnett, John Ignatius Haynes, and George Dennis Barnett. The Barnetts were sons of English-born St. Louis architect George I. Barnett, and Haynes was George D. Barnett's wife's brother. The founding of the firm dates to about 1895; George D. Barnett died in 1922, and the last structure attributed to the firm dates to about 1930.

== Work ==
Their designs include:

- Rockcliffe Mansion, 1000 Bird St., Hannibal, Missouri, 1898–1900 (Barnett, Haynes & Barnett), NRHP-listed
- Kingsbury Place, private place entry gates and three of the mansions (#3, #7, and #11), 1902
- Loretto Academy, Kansas City, Missouri, 1902
- Palace of Liberal Arts, Louisiana Purchase Exposition, St. Louis, 1904 (temporary)
- Hotel Jefferson, 415 N. Tucker Blvd. St. Louis, MO, 1904 (Barnett, Haynes & Barnett), NRHP-listed
- St. Ann's Orphan Asylum, St. Louis, 1904 (razed circa 1978)
- Mark Twain Hotel, 200 S. Main St. Hannibal, MO, 1905 (Barnett, Haynes & Barnett), NRHP-listed
- St. John's Mercy Hospital Building, 620 W. Scott Springfield, MO, 1906 (razed circa 1970) (Barnett, Haynes and Barnett, et al.), NRHP-listed
- Bank of New York Building, New York, 1907 (razed 1932)
- Marquette Hotel, 1734 Washington Ave. St. Louis, MO, 1907, NRHP-listed
- Connor Hotel, Joplin, Missouri, 1908
- Himmelberger and Harrison Building, 400 Broadway Cape Girardeau, MO, 1908 (Barnett, Haynes and Barnett), NRHP-listed
- Immaculate Conception / St. Henry's Church, St. Louis, 1908
- Congregation Temple Israel, one of the institutions at the Holy Corners Historic District, St. Louis, 1908
- Illinois Athletic Club, 112 S. Michigan Avenue, Chicago, 1908
- Connor Hotel, Joplin, Missouri, 1908
- Hotel Stratford, 229 Market St. Alton, IL, 1909 (Barnett, Haynes & Barnett), NRHP-listed
- the former Loretto Academy, 3407 Lafayette Avenue, St. Louis, MO, 1909 (Barnett, Haynes & Barnett), NRHP-listed
- Lenox Hall, University City, St. Louis, 1910
- Adolphus Hotel, 1315 Commerce St. Dallas, TX, 1912 (Barnett, Haynes and Barnett), NRHP-listed
- Brockman Building, 520 W. 7th St. and 708 S. Grand Ave. Los Angeles, CA, 1912 (Barnett, Haynes and Barnett), NRHP-listed
- Cathedral Basilica of St. Louis, St. Louis, 1912
- Busch Mausoleum, Bellefontaine Cemetery, St. Louis, 1915
- Post-Dispatch building, 1139 Olive Street, St. Louis, 1916, NRHP-listed
- Cathedral of St Patrick, El Paso, Texas, 1916
- Saint Clement Catholic Church, Chicago, 1917–1918
- McFarlin Building, 11 E. 5th St Tulsa, OK, 1918 (Barnett-Haynes-Barnett), NRHP-listed
- McFarlin House, 1610 S. Carson Ave., Tulsa, OK; 1918; NRHP-listed; Italian Renaissance style
- Little Sisters of the Poor Home for the Aged, 1400 18th Ave., S. Nashville, TN, 1919 (Barnett, Haynes and Barnett), NRHP-listed
- Crestview Manor, residence in the Buena Vista Park Historic District, Tulsa, OK, 1919 (Barnett, Haynes, Barnett), NRHP-listed
- Arcade Building, St. Louis, 1919
- Hotel Claridge, 109 N. Main St. Memphis, TN, 1924 (Barnett, Haynes & Barnett with Memphis architects Jones & Furbringer), NRHP-listed
- Jefferson Arms Apartments, St. Louis, 1928
- B'Nai Israel Synagogue, Cape Girardeau, Missouri, 1937

Additional works by the firm, in alphabetical rather than chronological order, are (with variations in attribution):

- Colonial Hotel, Springfield, Missouri
- Hamilton Hotel, St. Louis
- Immaculate Conception Church and Rectory, 312 Lafayette Ave. St. Louis, MO (Barnett, Haynes, Barnett), NRHP-listed
- Loretto Academy, 1111 W. 39th St. Kansas City, MO (Barnett, Haynes & Barnett), NRHP-listed
- Martin Shaughnessy Building, 2201-15 Washington Ave. St. Louis, MO (Barnett, Haynes & Barnett), NRHP-listed
- St. Mark the Evangelist Catholic Church, Convent and Academy, 1313 Academy Ave. & 5100 Minerva Ave. St. Louis, MO (Barnett & Haynes; Kennerty & Isedell), NRHP-listed
- Southern Hotel, Chicago
- Star Building, St. Louis
- Robert Henry Stockton House, 3508 Samuel Shepard Dr. St. Louis, MO (Barnett & Haynes; Barnett, Haynes & Barnett), NRHP-listed
- Waterman Place-Kingsbury Place--Washington Terrace Historic District, Bounded by Union Blvd., alley S of Waterman Place, Belt Ave., alley S of Kingsbury Place, Clara Ave., alley line bet St. Louis (Independent City), MO (Barnett, Haynes & Barnett), NRHP-listed
- One or more properties in Hamilton Place Historic District, 5900-6000 blocks of Enright, Cates, and Clemens St. Louis, MO (Barnett, Haynes & Barnett), NRHP-listed
