= B'Nai Israel Synagogue (Cape Girardeau, Missouri) =

Historic former synagogue in Missouri, US

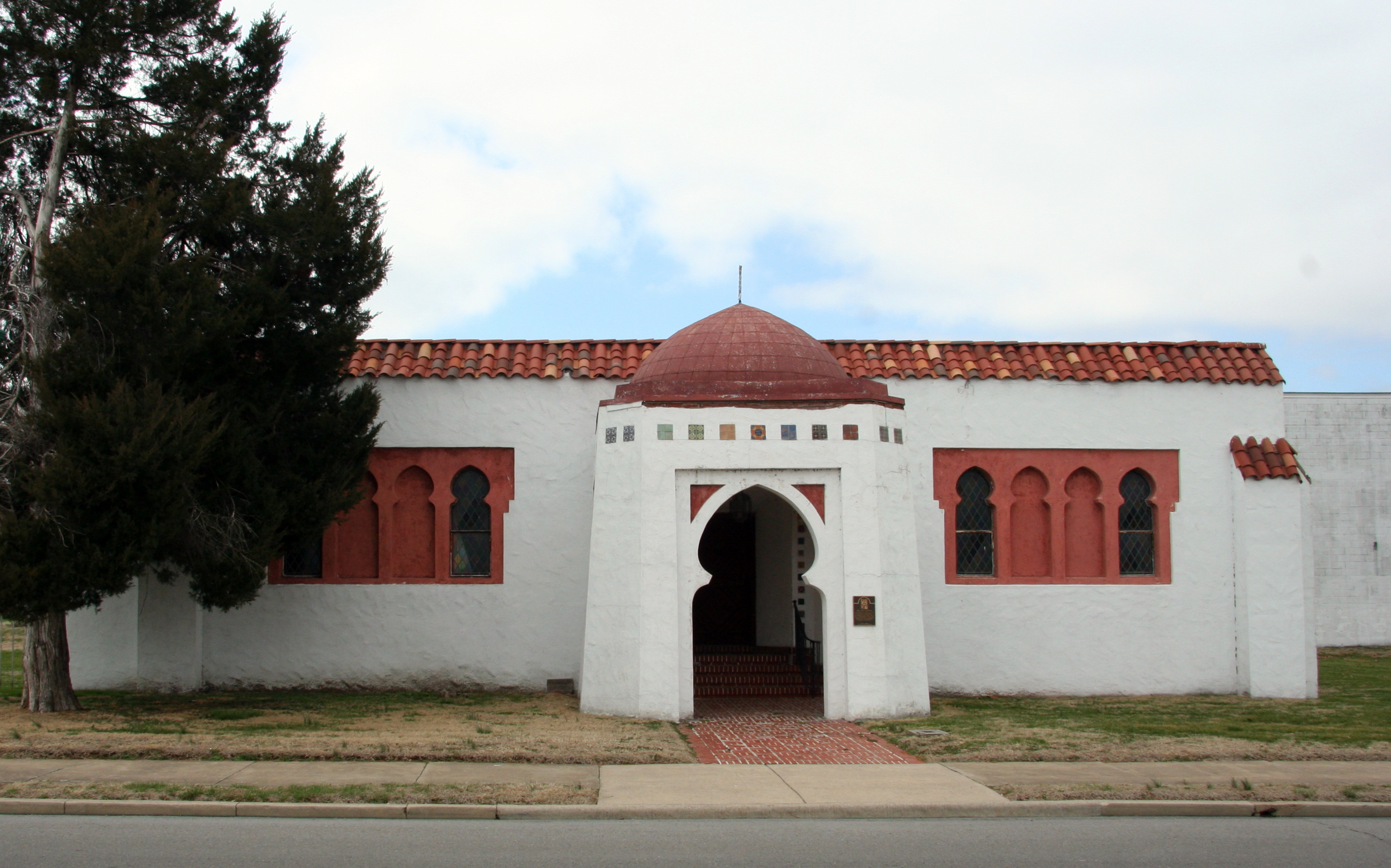

- Location in Missouri

Religion
- Affiliation: Judaism (former); Evangelical Christianity (current)
- Ecclesiastical or organizational status: Synagogue (former); Church (as of 2014)
- Ownership: Lighthouse United
- Status: Closed (as a synagogue); Active (as a church)

Location
- Location: 126 South Main Street, Cape Girardeau, Missouri
- Country: United States
- Interactive map of B'Nai Israel Synagogue
- Coordinates: 37°18′11″N 89°31′8″W

Architecture
- Architect: Thomas P. Barnett Jr.
- Type: Synagogue
- Style: Spanish Colonial Revival; Moorish Revival
- Funded by: Hecht family and others
- Completed: 1937

Specifications
- Dome: One
- Materials: Stuccoed brick, glazed ceramic tiles
- B'Nai Israel Synagogue
- U.S. National Register of Historic Places
- U.S. Historic district – Contributing property
- Area: less than one acre
- Part of: Courthouse-Seminary Neighborhood Historic District (ID10000723)
- NRHP reference No.: 04000385

Significant dates
- Added to NRHP: May 5, 2004
- Designated CP: September 9, 2010

B'Nai Israel Synagogue is an historic former Jewish synagogue, and now Evangelical church, located at 126 South Main in Cape Girardeau, Missouri, in the United States.

It was erected in 1937 and added to the National Register of Historic Places in 2004. It is located in the Courthouse-Seminary Neighborhood Historic District.

== History ==
The decision to build a synagogue for Cape Girardeau's Jewish community came following the destruction of their Torah. In 1937, a 450-year-old Torah was brought to the United States by Isaac Becker, a Sikeston merchant. Isaac Becker had visited his father in Germany, who told him life for Jews in Germany was getting bad and that the book would be safer with him in the United States. Until that time, the High Holiday service was held in a number of locations: the local Elks Club building, the Sturdivant Bank, the Presbyterian Church, the Community Building in Fairground Park. However, tragedy struck on February 27, 1937, when the book was lost as the Community Building - the building it had been stored at - had been consumed by fire. After the fire, it was decided that a permanent synagogue was needed for both the Jewish community to worship at and as a place to store the community's scrolls. The synagogue was designed by the Saint Louis architect Thomas P. Barnett Jr. who also designed other buildings in Cape Girardeau as well as the Cathedral Basilica of Saint Louis. The synagogue is located at 126 S. Main Street in Cape Girardeau's historic commercial district.

== Architecture ==
The synagogue is a stuccoed brick, one-story building constructed in the Spanish Colonial Revival style with Islamic influences. The building is covered in white stucco and red mission tiles. The building has a flap sloping roofline and red tiles along the parapet. A dome constructed of red painted sheet metal squares. A symmetrical band of decorative ceramic mosaic tiles form the base of the dome. Recessed Islamic pointed horseshoe arches provide openings on all three sides. Diamond pane casement windows with Islamic detail are arranged in the sides of the portico. To the south lies a gated area made of wrought iron with the Star of David molded into the iron.
