= Mark Twain Hotel (Missouri) =

- U.S. National Register of Historic Places
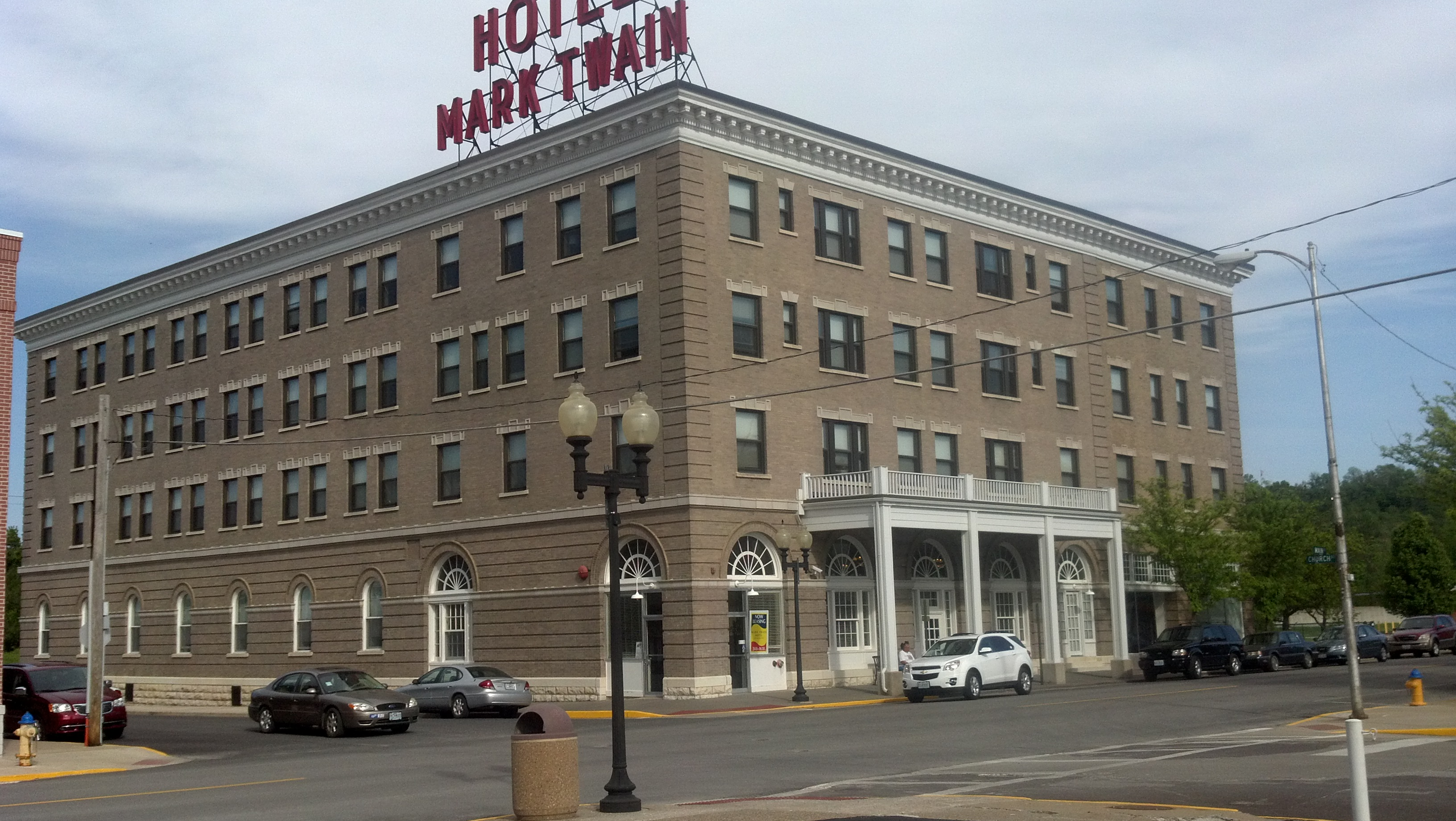
- Mark Twain Hotel, May 2014

- Location within Missouri Location within the United States
- Location: 200 S. Main St., Hannibal, Missouri
- Coordinates: 39°42′33″N 91°21′17″W
- Area: 0.4 acres (0.16 ha)
- Built: 1905, 1918
- Architect: Barnett, Haynes & Barnett
- Architectural style: Renaissance
- MPS: Hannibal Central Business District MRA
- NRHP reference No.: 86002136
- Added to NRHP: August 1, 1986

Mark Twain Hotel is a historic hotel building located at Hannibal, Marion County, Missouri. It was designed by Barnett, Haynes & Barnett and built in 1905. It is a four-story, Renaissance Revival style steel-frame structure with a granite foundation and beige pressed-brick exterior. The annex was built in 1918. It features semicircular arches over the main door and adjacent windows.

It was then added to the National Register of Historic Places in 1986.

It was converted to senior apartments in 2006.
