= Hotel Stratford =

- U.S. National Register of Historic Places
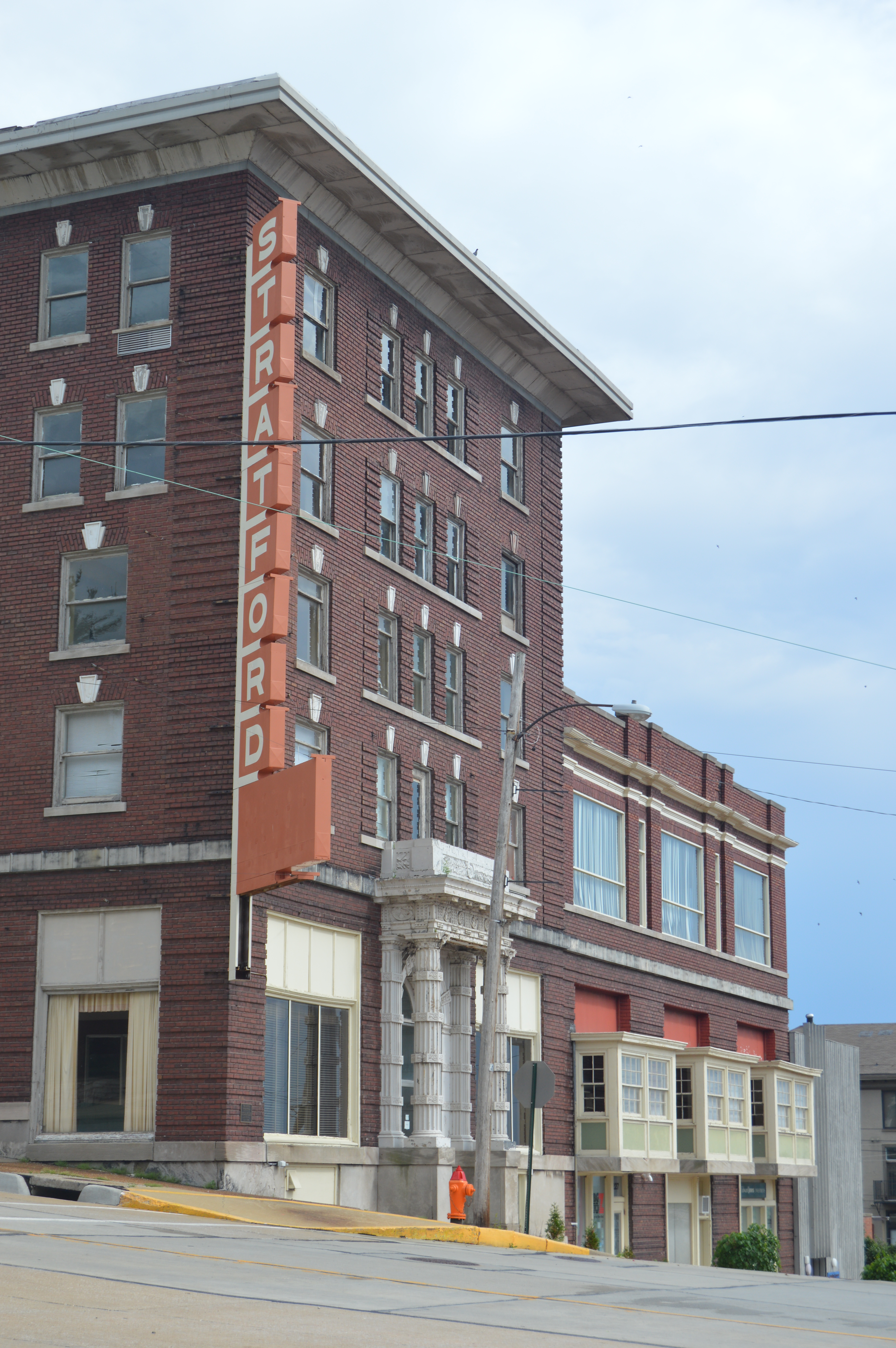
- Front and slight portion of the northern side

- Location within Illinois Location within the United States
- Location: 229 Market St., Alton, Illinois
- Coordinates: 38°53′26″N 90°11′6″W
- Area: less than one acre
- Built: 1909
- Built by: Gray, C.L. Construction Co.
- Architect: Barnett, Haynes & Barnett
- Architectural style: Classical Revival
- NRHP reference No.: 99001709
- Added to NRHP: January 27, 2000

The Hotel Stratford is a historic hotel located at 229 Market St. in Alton, Illinois. The hotel, originally known as the Illini Hotel, opened in 1909. St. Louis architectural firm Barnett, Haynes & Barnett designed the hotel in the Classical Revival style. The five-story brick building features brick quoins, limestone bands and window sills, terra cotta ornamentation, and a cantilevered cornice. The hotel opened a rooftop garden in 1910 and a reception room in 1912, and it became one of many hotels which drew conventions to Alton; a contemporary newspaper account described the building as part of the "greatest improvement in property in the city of Alton". In 1925, new owner E. J. Lockyer renamed the hotel to its current name. The hotel is the only hotel built in Alton before 1950 that is still in operation.

The hotel was added to the National Register of Historic Places on January 27, 2000.
