= Courthouse–Seminary Neighborhood Historic District =

Historic district in Missouri, United States

- U.S. National Register of Historic Places
- U.S. Historic district
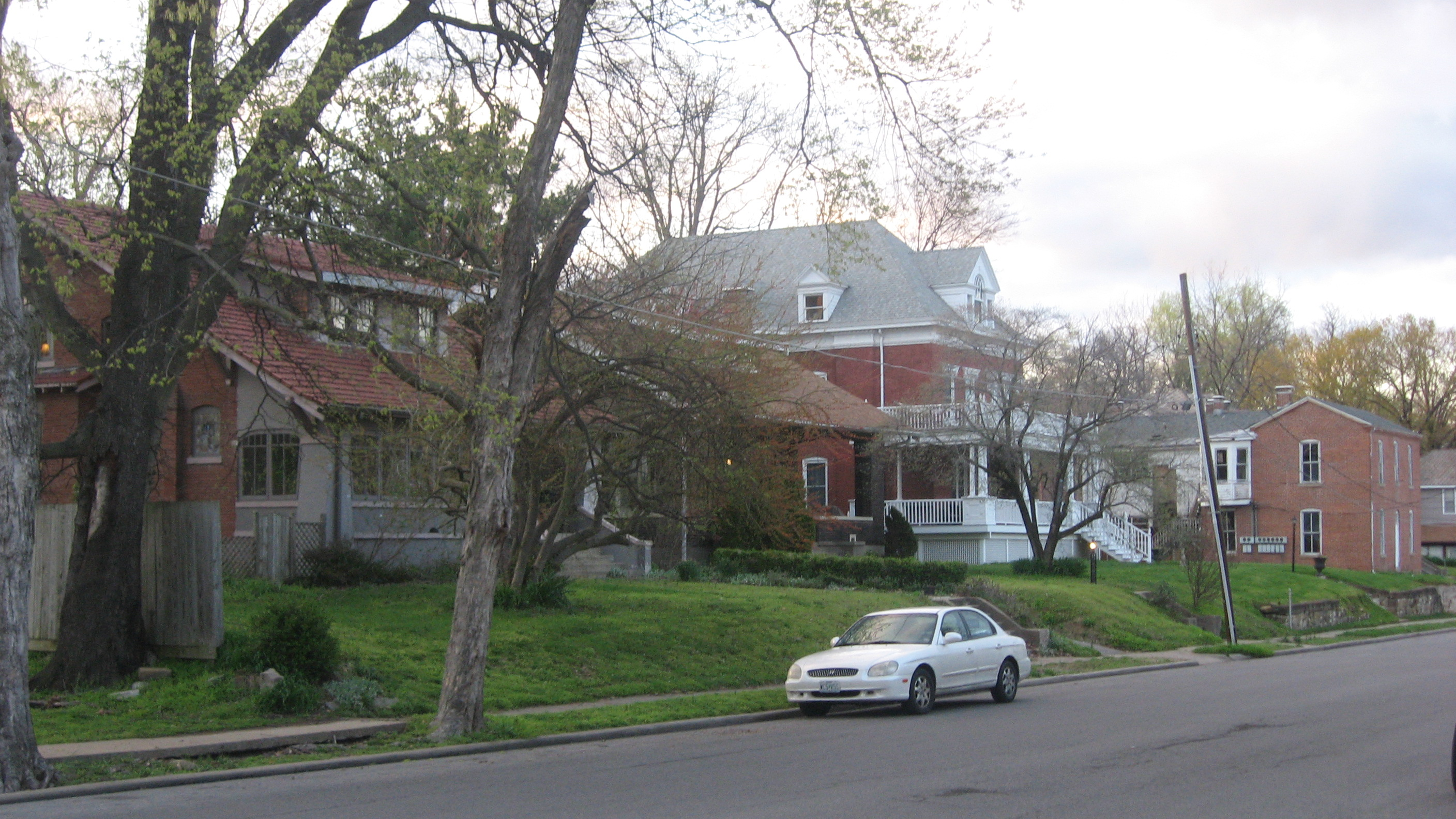
- Lorimier south of Merriwether in Cape Girardeau, April 2013

- Location within Missouri Location within the United States
- Location: Roughly bounded by Middle, Themis, Main, Aquamsi, and Morgan Oak Streets, Cape Girardeau, Missouri
- Coordinates: 37°18′05″N 89°31′17″W
- Area: 60 acres (24 ha)
- Built: 1848-1948
- Architect: Gerhart, J. W.
- Architectural style: Italianate, Queen Anne, Colonial Revival, Tudor Revival, Mission Revival, Late Gothic Revival, Craftsman, Art Deco
- NRHP reference No.: 10000723
- Added to NRHP: September 9, 2010

Courthouse–Seminary Neighborhood Historic District is a national historic district located at Cape Girardeau, Cape Girardeau County, Missouri. The district encompasses 121 contributing buildings and 2 contributing sites in a predominantly residential section of Cape Girardeau. It developed between about 1848 and 1948, and includes representative examples of Italianate, Queen Anne, Colonial Revival, Tudor Revival, Mission Revival, Late Gothic Revival, American Craftsman, and Art Deco style architecture. The district contains 1 1/2 and 2 1/2-story brick single-family homes, with multi-family homes and a few commercial buildings dispersed throughout. Located in the district is the separately listed Robert Felix and Elma Taylor Wichterich House, William Henry and Lilla Luce Harrison House, Huhn-Harrison House, B'Nai Israel Synagogue, St. Vincent de Paul Catholic Church, August and Amalia Shivelbine House, Glenn House, House at 323 Themis Street, and George Boardman Clark House.

It was listed on the National Register of Historic Places in 2010.
