= Little Sisters of the Poor Home for the Aged (Nashville, Tennessee) =

- U.S. National Register of Historic Places
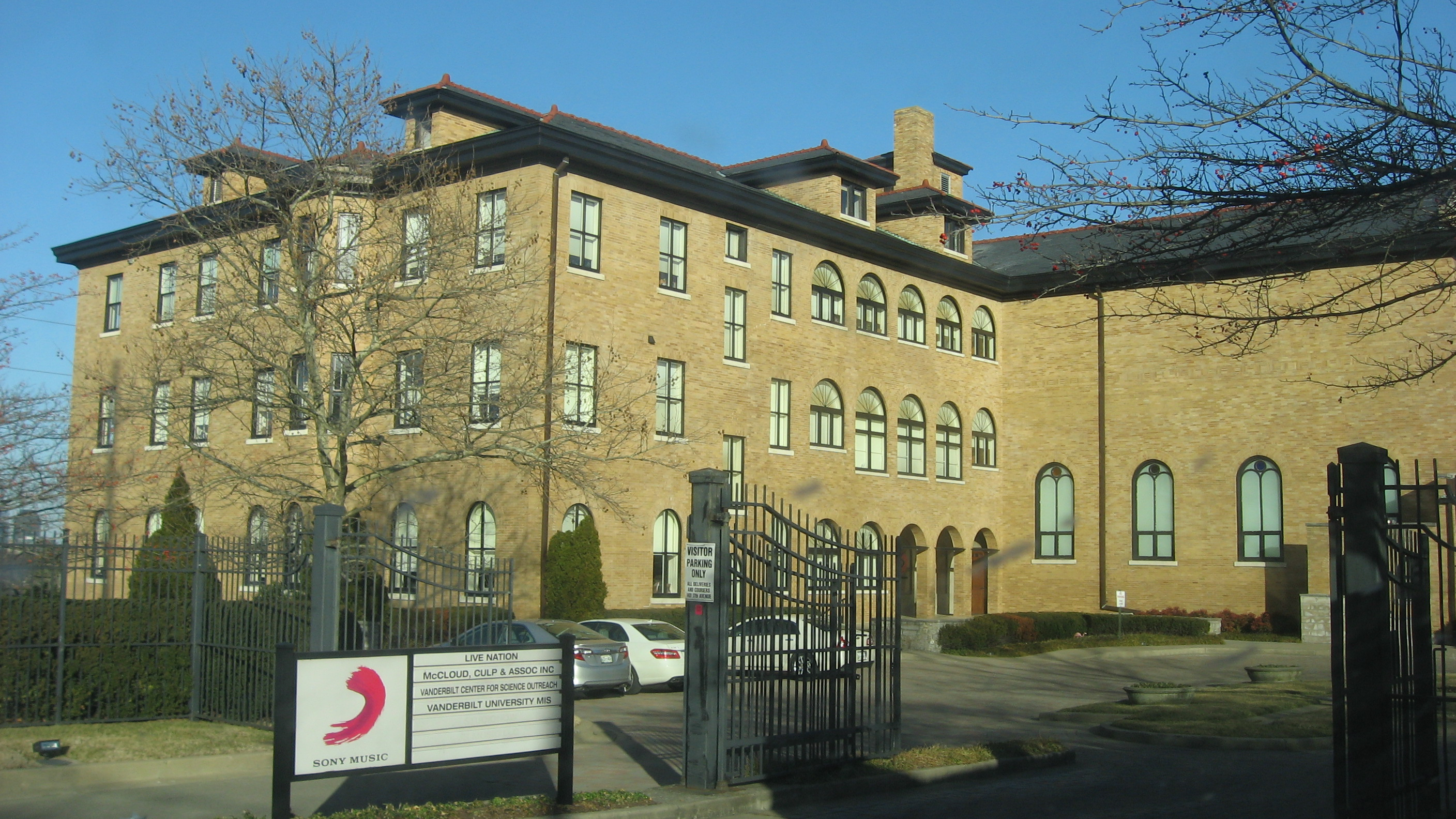
- The Little Sisters of the Poor Home in 2014

- Location within Tennessee
- Location: 1400 18th Ave., S., Nashville, Tennessee
- Coordinates: 36°8′27″N 86°47′44″W
- Area: 2.2 acres (0.89 ha)
- Built: 1916
- Architect: Barnett, Haynes & Barnett
- Architectural style: Renaissance, Vern. Renaissance Revival
- NRHP reference No.: 85001608
- Added to NRHP: July 25, 1985

The Little Sisters of the Poor Home for the Aged is a historic building in Nashville, Tennessee, U.S.. It was built in 1916 for the Little Sisters of the Poor, a Roman Catholic order which takes care of the elderly poor. It closed down in 1968, and it was turned into a series of nursing homes until 1998. It was subsequently used by the music industry, including Sony. In 2014, Sony Music sold it to Vanderbilt University for US$12.1 million.

The building has been listed on the National Register of Historic Places since July 25, 1985.
