= Immaculate Conception Church and Rectory (St. Louis) =

Historic church in Missouri, United States

- U.S. National Register of Historic Places
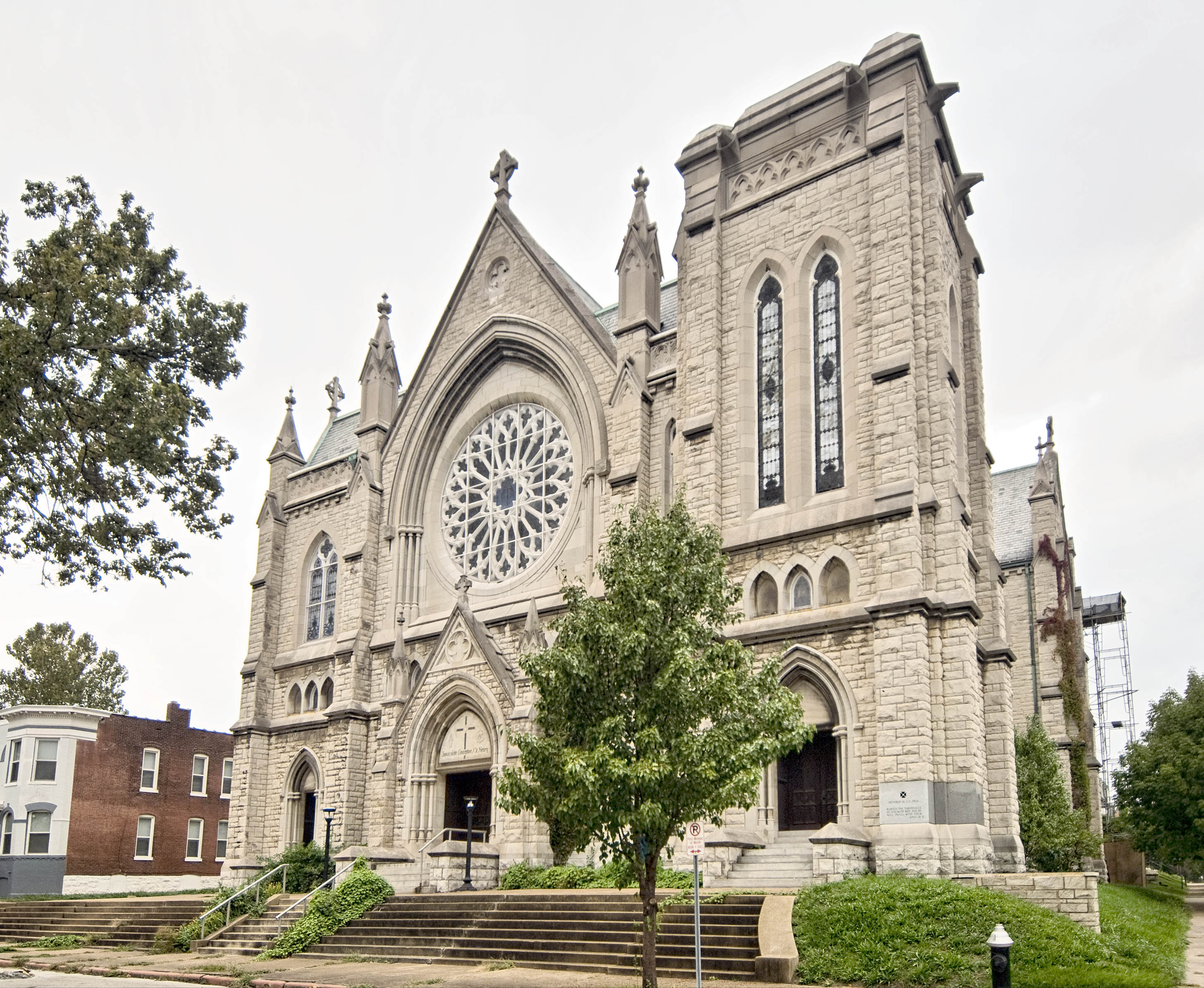
- The building in 2012

- Location within St. Louis Location within Missouri Location within the United States
- Location: 3120 Lafayette Ave. St. Louis, Missouri
- Coordinates: 38°37′04″N 90°14′32″W
- Built: 1908
- Architect: Barnett, Haynes & Barnett
- Architectural style: Gothic Revival
- NRHP reference No.: 08000031
- Added to NRHP: February 19, 2008

Immaculate Conception Church and Rectory is a former Catholic church and adjacent rectory in The Gate District neighborhood of St. Louis, Missouri, United States. The former church and rectory are listed on the National Register of Historic Places. The church and rectory were also the site of the Augustinians novitiate of Robert Prevost, the future Pope Leo XIV, from 1977 to 1978.

== History ==
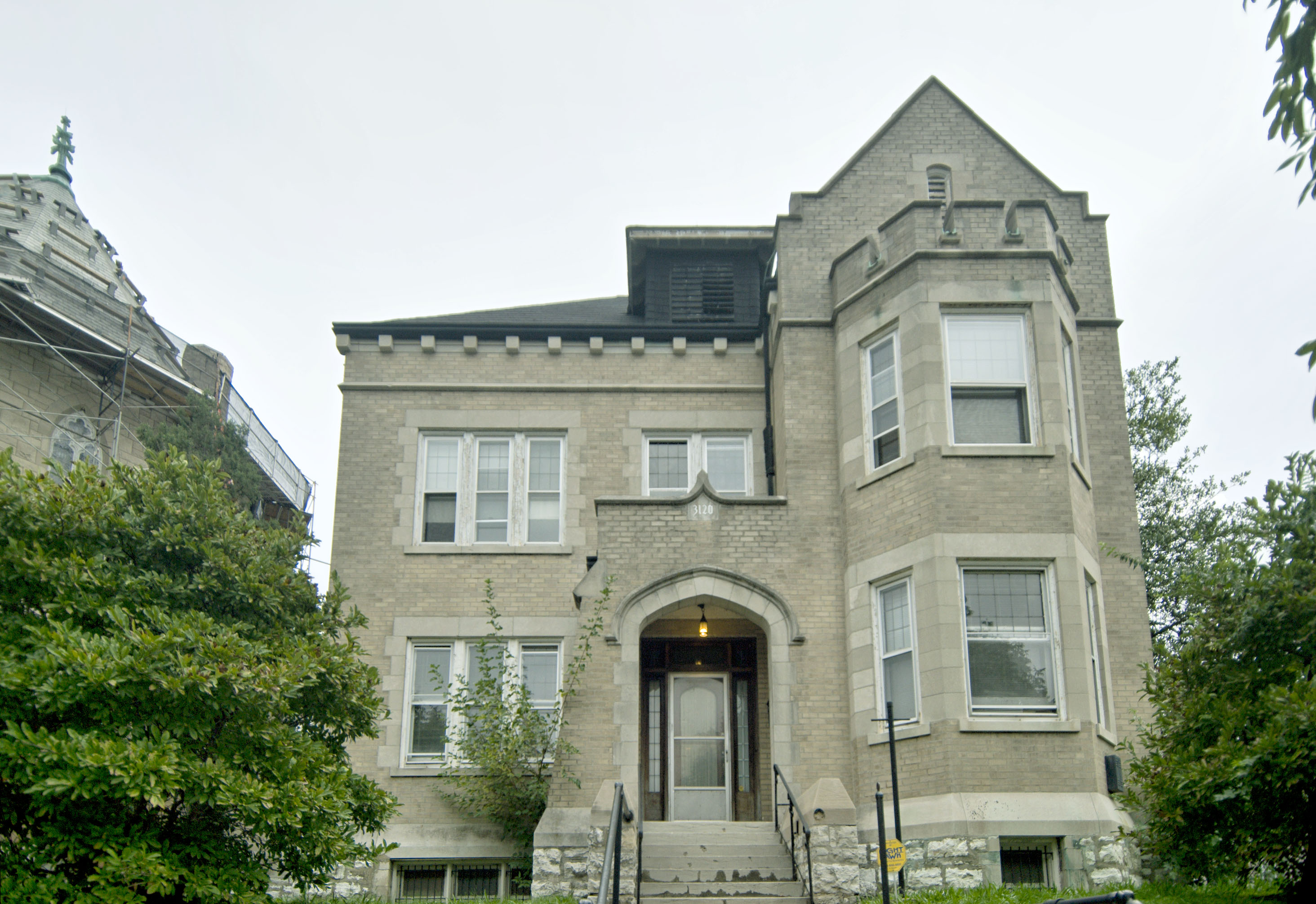
Immaculate Conception Rectory

Three parishes have held the name of Immaculate Conception in the Archdiocese of St. Louis. The first, standing at Eigthth and Chestnut, was founded by James Duggan in 1854 and abandoned in 1872 after the building collapsed during the digging of a railroad tunnel to connect St. Louis Union Station and the Eads Bridge. The second, at Jefferson Avenue, opened in 1874 and closed in 1902.

=== Construction of church and school ===
Two years after the opening of the Jefferson Avenue church, St. Kevin's was founded as an English-speaking parish serving the Irish immigrant community on the south side of St. Louis. It was named for Kevin of Glendalough, the patron saint of Dublin. By 1904, St. Kevin had outgrown its original location, and construction began on the present church that stands at the intersection of Lafayette and Longfellow. The architectural firm Barnett, Haynes & Barnett designed the new building in the Gothic Revival style. Upon its blessing on May 10, 1908, by John J. Glennon, the church was renamed Immaculate Conception, in part to invite parishioners of the earlier churches. The old St. Kevin church building was converted into Immaculate Conception school after the consecration of the new church on December 19, 1908. The rectory on the property was completed in 1923.

In 1926, a dedicated school was built at 2912 Lafayette Avenue, a Jacobean Revival building designed by Henry Hess. At the time of its construction, it served between 300 and 400 children, mostly from Irish and German backgrounds.

=== Decline ===
Beginning in the 1950s and 1960s, the parish population began to change, as more Italian, African-American, and Puerto Rican students came to the area and the school, and White flight lead to middle-class white families leaving the area. The construction of Interstate 44 also disturbed and split the neighborhood surrounding the parish.

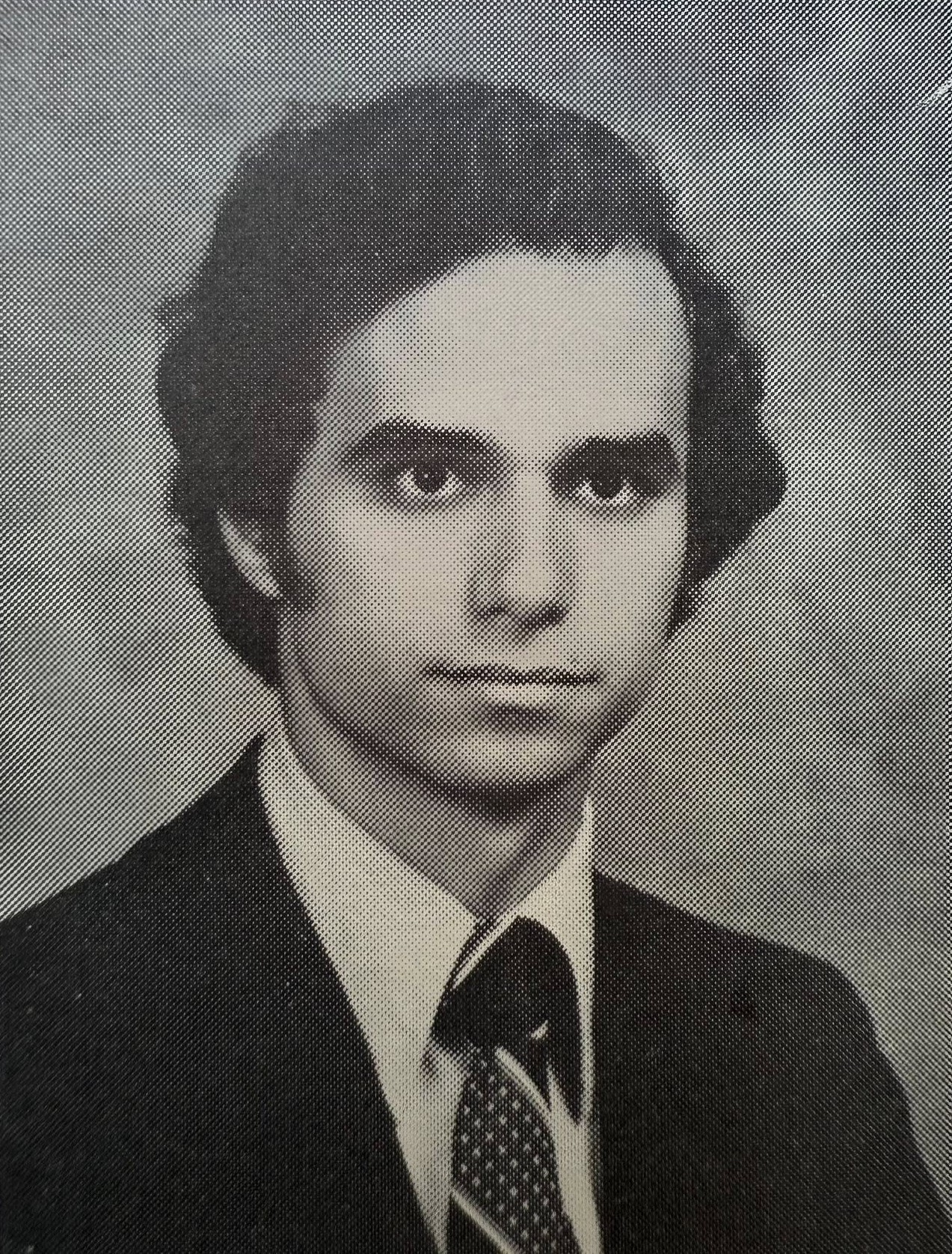
Robert Prevost in 1977, the same year he entered the Augustinian novitiate at Immaculate Conception church.

In 1969, citing increasing operational deficits, and the inability of the parish to fund its own school, the Archdiocese of St. Louis took over Immaculate Conception's grade school and merged it with four others, forming Compton Heights Catholic School at the former Immaculate Conception grade school. In 1972, priests of the Order of Saint Augustine took charge of both Immaculate Conception and neighboring St. Henry church, founding a novitiate at Immaculate Conception. Five years later, the future Leo XIV, then known as Robert Prevost, spent his first year as a vowed Augustinian at the parish, along with eight other classmates who had just completed their undergraduate work at Villanova University. In September of 1978, Prevost made his profession of simple vows at Immaculate Conception. The prior year, St. Henry and Immaculate Conception were merged into one parish. In 1979, Compton Heights Catholic School was closed and merged into neighboring Notre Dame School. St. Henry's was purchased by Grace Chapel Ministries in 1986 and sustained major fire damage in 1996 leading to its demolition. In 1988, the Augustinians returned administration of the church to the Archdiocese and moved the novitiate to St. Rita Church in Racine, Wisconsin.

=== Sale and alternate use ===
The parish school building was turned into apartments in 1985, and has been praised as an example of Adaptive reuse. In 2005, due to a declining parish population and needed facilities repairs, the parish was closed and merged into neighboring St. Margaret Church. Following its closure, it was sold to the Compton Heights Concert Band, who then sold the property to local restaurant owners in 2022. The church and its other associated properties were listed on the National Register of Historic Places in 2008. In 2025 the property was up for sale for $1.8 million.
