= William Henry and Lilla Luce Harrison House =

Historic house in Missouri, United States

- U.S. National Register of Historic Places
- U.S. Historic district – Contributing property
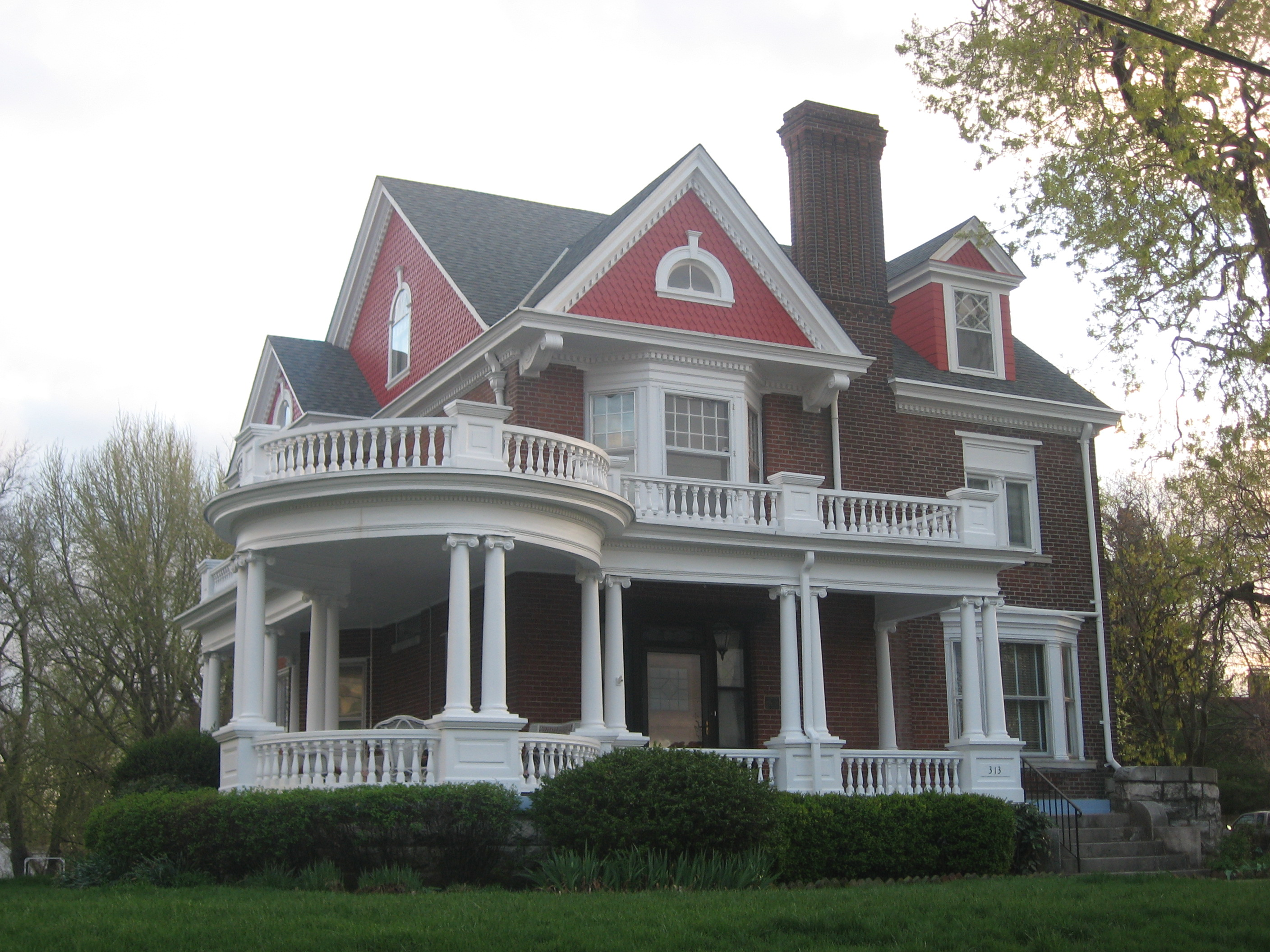
- William Henry and Lilla Luce Harrison House, April 2013

- Location within Missouri Location within the United States
- Location: 313 Themis St., Cape Girardeau, Missouri
- Area: 0.8 acres (0.32 ha)
- Built: 1897, c. 1908
- Architect: Legg, Jerome
- Architectural style: Queen Anne
- NRHP reference No.: 05001375
- Added to NRHP: December 6, 2005

William Henry and Lilla Luce Harrison House, also known as the Dr. Samuel Harris House, is a historic home located at Cape Girardeau, Missouri. It was built in 1897, and is a 2 1/2-story, free classic Queen Anne style brick dwelling. It has a steeply pitched side-gable roof with projecting dormers. It features a wraparound porch with circular verandah added between 1900 and 1908.

It was listed on the National Register of Historic Places in 2005. It is located in the Courthouse-Seminary Neighborhood Historic District.
