= Hotel Jefferson (St. Louis, Missouri) =

- U.S. National Register of Historic Places
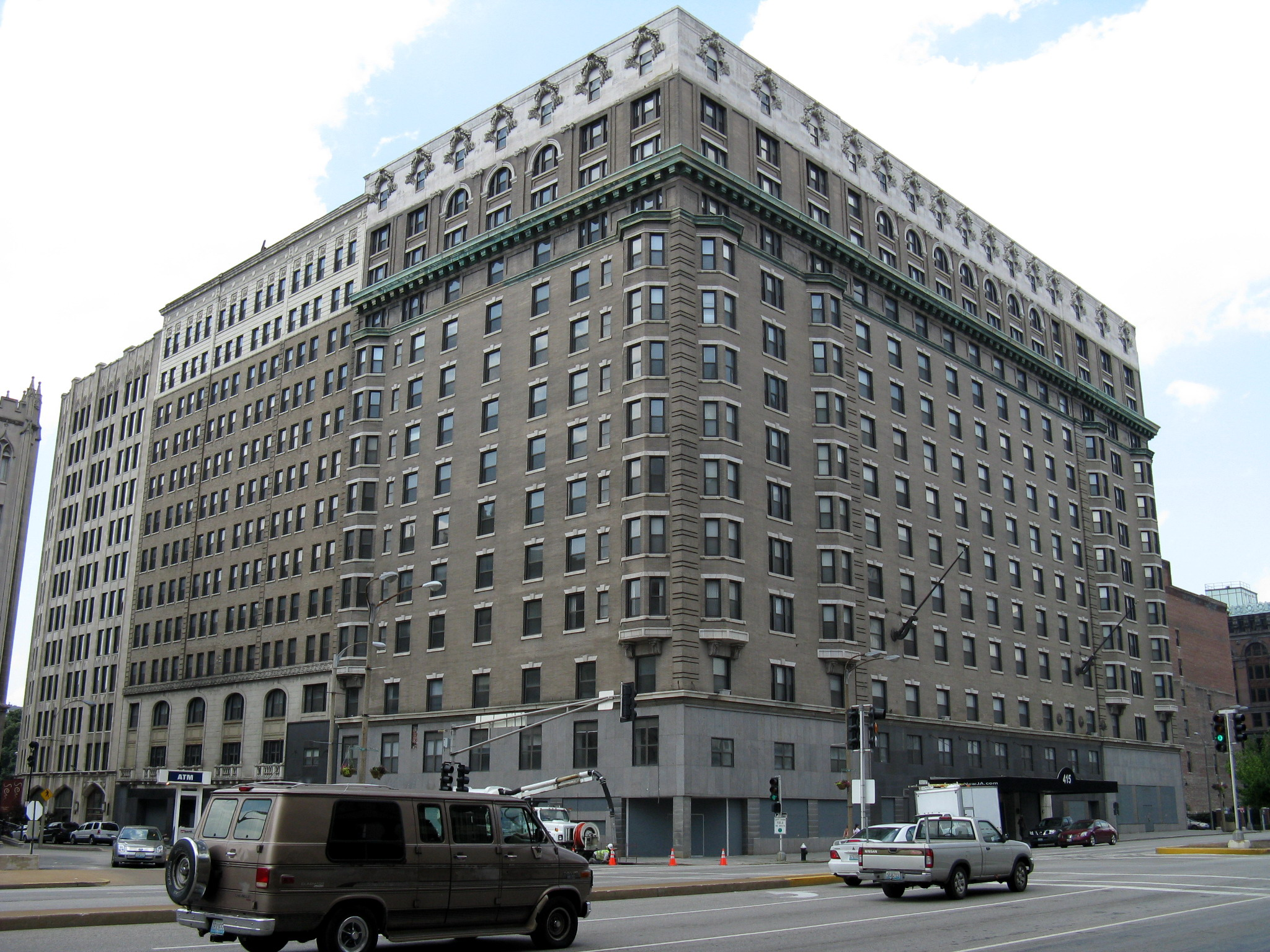

- Location within St. Louis Location within Missouri Location within the United States
- Location: 415 N. Tucker Blvd., St. Louis, Missouri
- Coordinates: 38°37′57″N 90°11′50″W
- Area: 1.4 acres (0.57 ha)
- Built: 1904, 1928
- Architect: Barnett, Haynes & Barnett
- Architectural style: Classical Revival
- NRHP reference No.: 03001066
- Added to NRHP: October 24, 2003

The Jefferson Arms is a historic building in downtown St. Louis, Missouri. It opened as the Hotel Jefferson in 1904 to serve visitors to the Louisiana Purchase Exposition and was named in honor of Thomas Jefferson.

== History ==
The original east half of the Hotel Jefferson was designed by Barnett, Haynes & Barnett; the Classical Revival structure features terra cotta decorations. The hotel was opened to the public for the first time on April 2, 1904, for a charity ball sponsored by the St. Louis chapter of the Daughters of the Confederacy and the Confederate Memorial Society. The hotel opened to overnight guests on April 29, 1904, the day before the World's Fair. The Democratic National Convention was held at the hotel in 1904 and 1916.

The hotel was sold in 1927 and in 1928 the new owners constructed a huge addition on the west side of the hotel designed by the firm Teich & Sullivan, doubling its capacity and adding two banquet rooms. The Jefferson Plaza Garage was added to the hotel in the same year; the garage includes elements of the Art Deco and Tudor Revival styles. The garage helped to alleviate St. Louis' downtown traffic congestion and serve visitors with cars; the Hotel Jefferson is the only historic downtown hotel with its own original parking garage. During the late 1930s, Max Theodore Safron (d. 1980) operated his art gallery from the Jefferson Hotel's mezzanine, where he primarily sold American, British, and French paintings to the city's wealthy clientele. The Jefferson hosted conventions and celebrities in the city for the next two decades and was recognized by Gourmet magazine as "one of the best hotels in St. Louis".

The Jefferson was sold to Hilton Hotels Corporation on October 31, 1950 for $2.6 million, retaining its original name. In 1952, Hilton gutted and modernized many of the hotel's surviving historic interiors, including the main lobby, dining room and coffee shop, and added a 24-hour drug store/soda fountain. In 1954, Hilton purchased the nationwide Statler Hotels chain. As a result, they owned multiple large hotels in many major cities. In St Louis, for example, they owned both the Jefferson and the Statler Hotel St. Louis. This was found by the government to be an anti-trust violation and Hilton was required to sell The Jefferson, the Roosevelt Hotel in New York and the Mayflower Hotel in Washington D.C.. The Jefferson was sold to The Sheraton Corporation on December 29, 1955, for $7.5 million. The hotel was renamed The Sheraton-Jefferson. It was again renamed The Jefferson Hotel in 1973, though still operating within Sheraton.

The hotel closed on July 23, 1975. The building reopened in 1977 as a residence for the elderly called the Jefferson Arms Apartments. The building was added to the National Register of Historic Places on October 24, 2003.

In 2006, developers cleared the building of residents, planning to convert it to condominiums; however, the project collapsed. The building was tied up in litigation for many years until it was finally sold to Alterra Worldwide in 2017 for $7 million. The new owners announced plans to convert the enormous building to a combination of 239 apartments, a 198-room AC by Marriott hotel, and 20,000 sq ft of retail. In February 2021, Alterra paid over $100,000 in back taxes owed on the property, clearing the way for $17.3 million in financing from the city of St. Louis. It was reported at that time that the renovation work would cost $104 million. In October 2022, following the settlement of a lawsuit by the carpenters' union, Alterra announced slightly adjusted plans, for 225 hotel rooms and 235 apartments. By early 2025, construction work had progressed, with numerous historic elements restored and the hotel scheduled to open in July 2026.
