= Mark Twain Hotel =

Mark Twain Hotel may refer to:

- Mark Twain Hotel (Chicago)
- Mark Twain Hotel (Missouri)
- Hotel Mark Twain (Los Angeles)
