= August and Amalia Shivelbine House =

Historic house in Missouri, United States

- U.S. National Register of Historic Places
- U.S. Historic district – Contributing property
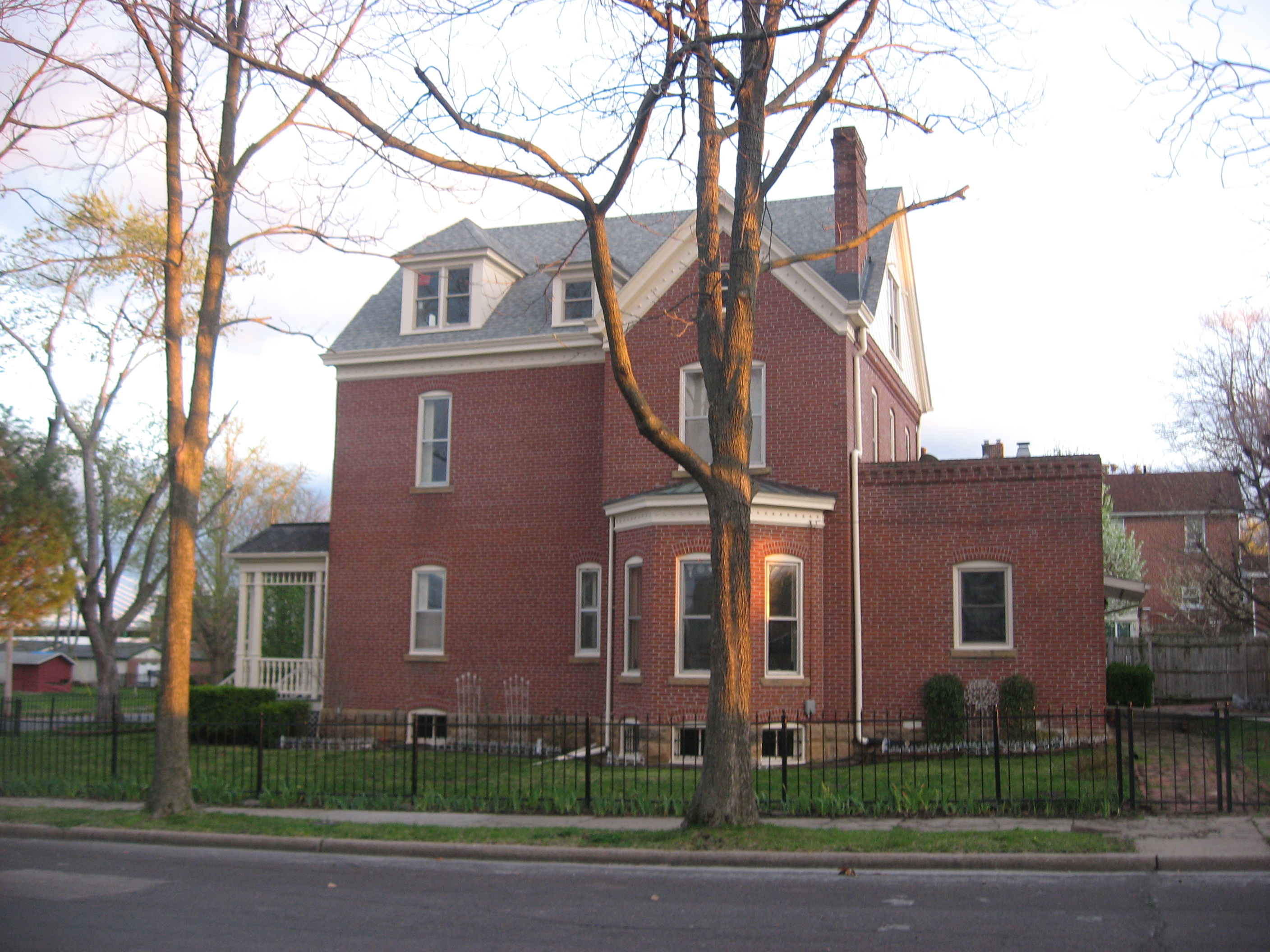
- August and Amalia Shivelbine House, April 2013

- Location within Missouri Location within the United States
- Location: 303 S. Spanish St., Cape Girardeau, Missouri
- Coordinates: 37°18′2″N 89°31′14″W
- Area: less than one acre
- Built: c. 1890
- Architectural style: Queen Anne
- NRHP reference No.: 99000743
- Added to NRHP: June 25, 1999

August and Amalia Shivelbine House is a historic home located at Cape Girardeau, Missouri, United States. It was built about 1890, and is a 2 1/2-story, Queen Anne style brick dwelling. It has a front gable roof and segmentally arched windows. It features an entry porch with a truncated hipped roof.

It was listed on the National Register of Historic Places in 1999. It is located in the Courthouse-Seminary Neighborhood Historic District.
