= St. John's Mercy Hospital Building =

- U.S. National Register of Historic Places
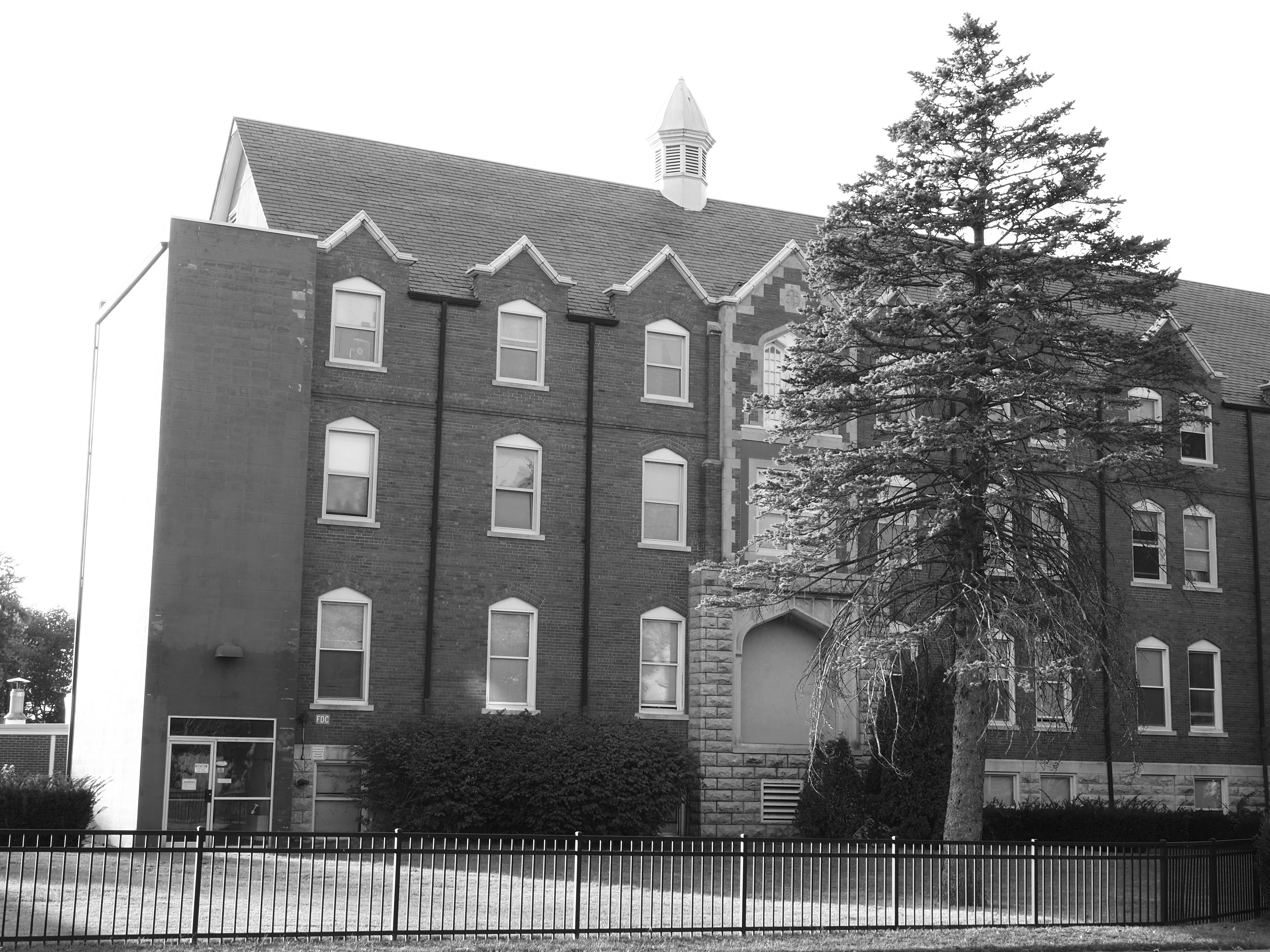
- St. John's Mercy Hospital Building in 2024

- Location within Missouri Location within the United States
- Location: 620 W. Scott, Springfield, Missouri
- Coordinates: 37°13′17″N 93°17′49″W
- Area: less than one acre
- Built: 1914, 1922, 1944
- Architect: Heckenlively, James; Barnett, Haynes & Barnett, et al.
- Architectural style: Tudor Revival
- NRHP reference No.: 03000867
- Added to NRHP: September 2, 2003

St. John's Mercy Hospital Building is a historic hospital building located at Springfield, Greene County, Missouri. The building was constructed in four stages: The original section was built in 1906 (demolished about 1970); a separate convent was constructed in 1914; a four-story Jacobethan addition was added in 1922; and in 1944 a four-story unit and gymnasium were constructed. The brick and limestone building features Tudor arch and segmental arch openings.

It was listed on the National Register of Historic Places in 2003.
