= Judith Crow House =

Historic house in Missouri, United States

- House at 323 Themis Street
- U.S. National Register of Historic Places
- U.S. Historic district – Contributing property
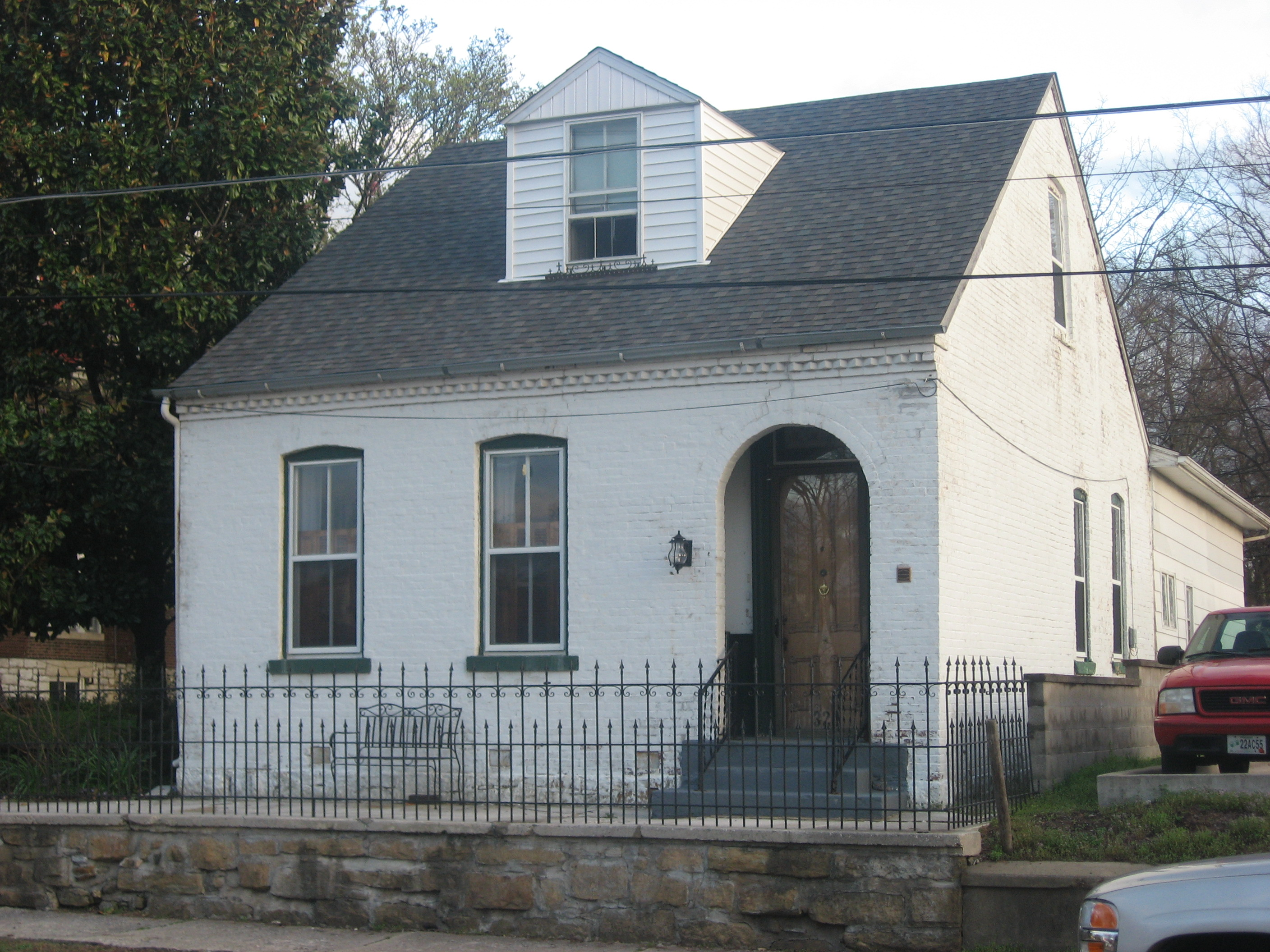
- House at 323 Themis Street, April 2013

- Location within Missouri Location within the United States
- Location: 323 Themis St., Cape Girardeau, Missouri
- Coordinates: 37°18′18″N 89°31′18″W
- Area: less than one acre
- Built: 1864
- Architectural style: German Brick Cottage
- NRHP reference No.: 97000629
- Added to NRHP: June 27, 1997

Judith Crow House, also known as Henry Bohlke House, is a historic home located in Cape Girardeau, Missouri. It was built about 1864, and is a 1 1/2-story, painted brick dwelling decorated in the German Vernacular style. It features two arched, double hung, two over two windows, ornamental brick work, and a recessed doorway. The building is nicknamed after Judith Crow, who bought the house in 1963.

It was listed on the National Register of Historic Places in 1997 as the House at 323 Themis Street. It is located in the Courthouse-Seminary Neighborhood Historic District.
