= Connor Hotel (Joplin, Missouri) =

- Joplin Connor Hotel
- U.S. National Register of Historic Places
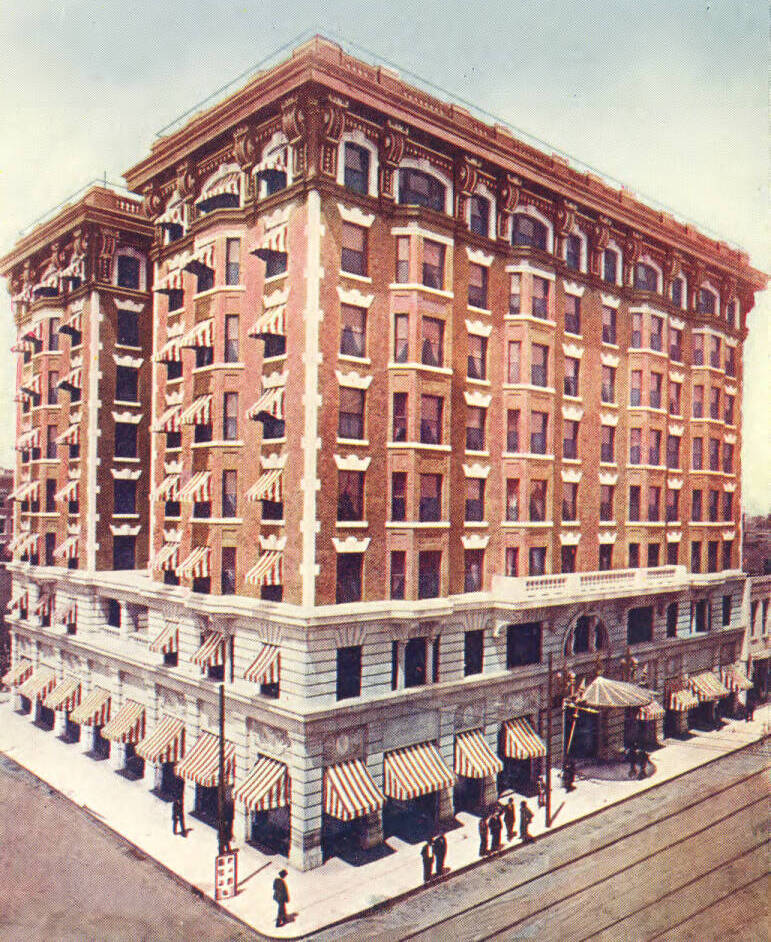

- Location within Missouri Location within the United States
- Location: 324 Main St., Joplin, Missouri
- Coordinates: 37°5′17″N 94°30′49″W
- Area: 9.9 acres (4.0 ha)
- Built: 1906-1907
- Architect: Barnett, Haynes & Barnett
- Architectural style: Classical Revival
- NRHP reference No.: 73001042
- Added to NRHP: February 28, 1973

The Connor Hotel was a beaux arts style hotel at 324 Main Street in Joplin, Missouri, United States. Built between 1906 and 1908, the structure is best known nationally because of its unexpected collapse in 1978 which killed two men.

== Construction ==
The Connor Hotel was the brainchild of Thomas Connor, an early 20th century Joplin, Missouri millionaire. Before the Connor Hotel was built, Connor owned the Joplin Hotel. The Joplin had 3 stories and about 50 rooms. It sat where the Connor hotel would later be built.

Rumors went around that Connor would expand the Joplin Hotel. Instead, in 1906, Connor demolished the building to make a new hotel.

The new hotel's construction began immediately after demolition, and it was going to be called the Joplin Hotel, like its predecessor. However, in 1907, Connor died at the age of 60. When the new hotel opened in 1908 at a cost of $750,000, the new 9 story hotel was named the Connor Hotel, in his memory.

== History ==
The Connor Hotel officially opened Sunday, April 12, 1908, but had a soft opening a few days earlier. Throughout the years, the hotel featured restaurants, multiple dining rooms, a coffee shop, barber shop, beauty salon, billiards room, cigar shop, and a bar (until prohibition closed it in 1919). It even ended up having its own orchestra, newspaper, and entertainers. In 1915, an enclosed rooftop garden was added to the building. The structure was designed by local architect Austin Allen, who designed the nearby Newman Brothers Building and the Olivia Apartments.

A notable incident occurred in 1924 when 9 members of the Ku Klux Klan visited a fundraising banquet held at the hotel for the construction of a new hospital. The robed individuals emptied several bags containing $10,000 in currency, posed for a photograph, and abruptly left.

In 1928, a 9 story annex was built next to the Connor Hotel. The annex more than doubled the number of rooms in the Connor Hotel and came at a cost of $2.5 million. Along with providing extra rooms, the annex offered several more restaurants, a ballroom, and a bus depot. At its peak, the Connor Hotel welcomed 6,500 guests per month.

Following the Second World War, the Connor Hotel would go through several owners. Little was done to maintain and modernize the aging hotel. The Connor Hotel closed in 1969 due to several factors, such as urban sprawl, the decline of rail travel that the Connor heavily relied on, staggering maintenance costs, and high operating costs. The next year, most of the building's contents were auctioned off to pay back taxes owed on the building.

In 1971, the Connor was purchased by two local businessmen who had hopes to restore the building. Although the building was placed on the National Register of Historic Places in 1973, the condition and cost to renovate the building proved too high. Despite 3,214 signatures from citizens opposing the building's demolition, it was announced that the Connor Hotel would be demolished on November 12, 1978.

== Structural collapse ==
On November 11, 1978, one day before its scheduled demolition, the 1908 portion of the hotel collapsed. The 1928 annex was still standing following the collapse. It is believed that it collapsed due to the weakening of structural columns during the demolition process. When the collapse occurred, 3 workers were inside. Two of the men, Thomas Oakes and Frederick Coe, did not survive. The third, Alfred Sommers, was rescued 82 hours after the collapse. The collapse made national news and is still considered one of the largest structural failures in the State of Missouri. Demolition on the surviving annex was ultimately completed three days later in order to repurpose the space for the new city library.
