= Huhn-Harrison House =

Historic house in Missouri, United States

- U.S. National Register of Historic Places
- U.S. Historic district – Contributing property
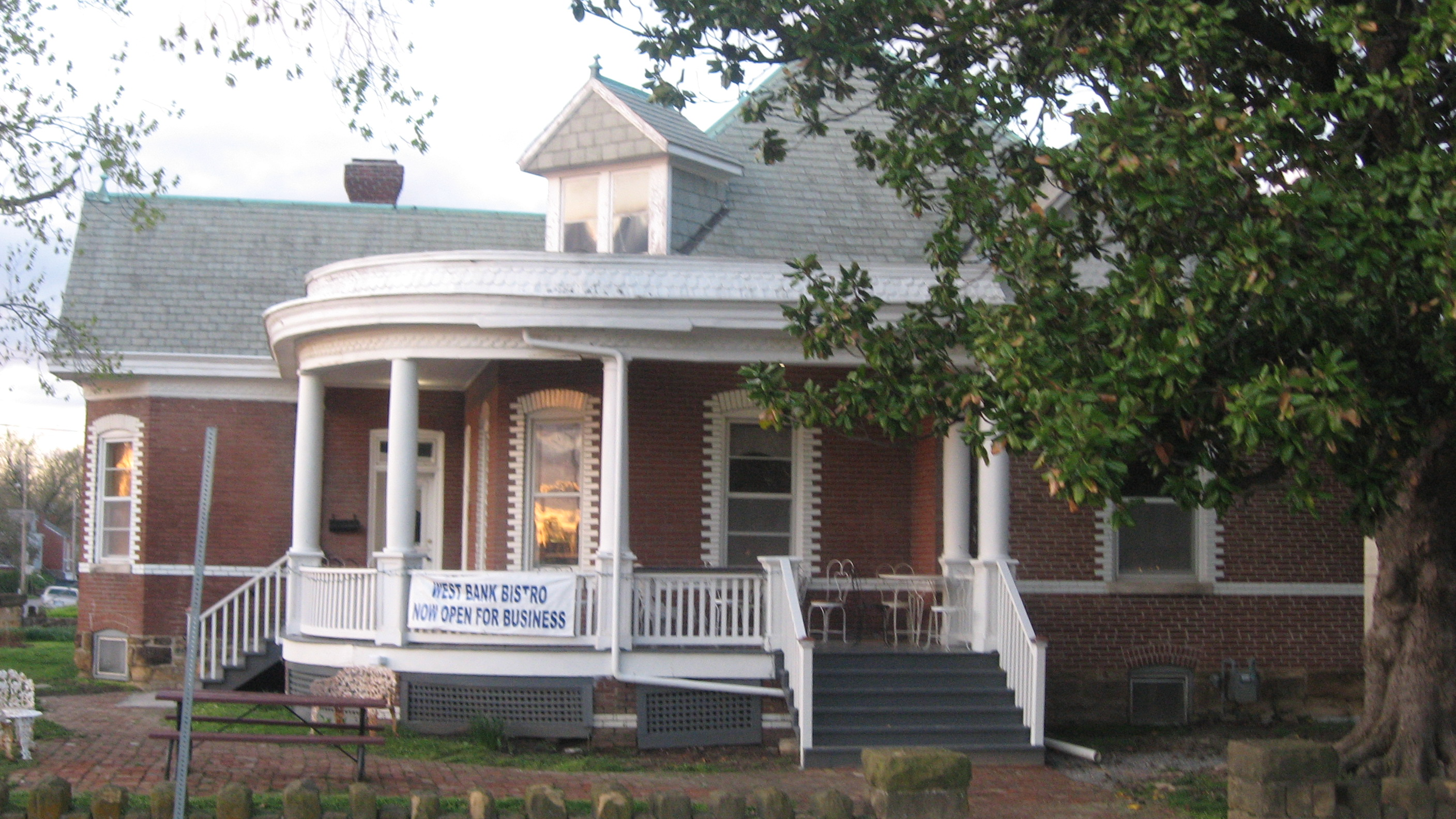
- Huhn-Harrison House, April 2013

- Location within Missouri Location within the United States
- Location: 340 S. Lorimier St., Cape Girardeau, Missouri
- Coordinates: 37°18′0″N 89°31′22″W
- Area: less than one acre
- Built: 1905-1906
- Architect: Schmidt, Albert J.
- Architectural style: Queen Anne
- NRHP reference No.: 02000699
- Added to NRHP: June 27, 2002

Huhn-Harrison House is a historic home located at Cape Girardeau, Missouri. It was built in 1905–1906, and is a 1 1/2-story, free classic Queen Anne style brick dwelling. It features a wrap-around porch with classical columns for porch supports and a rounded corner.

It was listed on the National Register of Historic Places in 2002. It is located in the Courthouse-Seminary Neighborhood Historic District.
