= Loretto Academy (Kansas City, Missouri) =

The Loretto
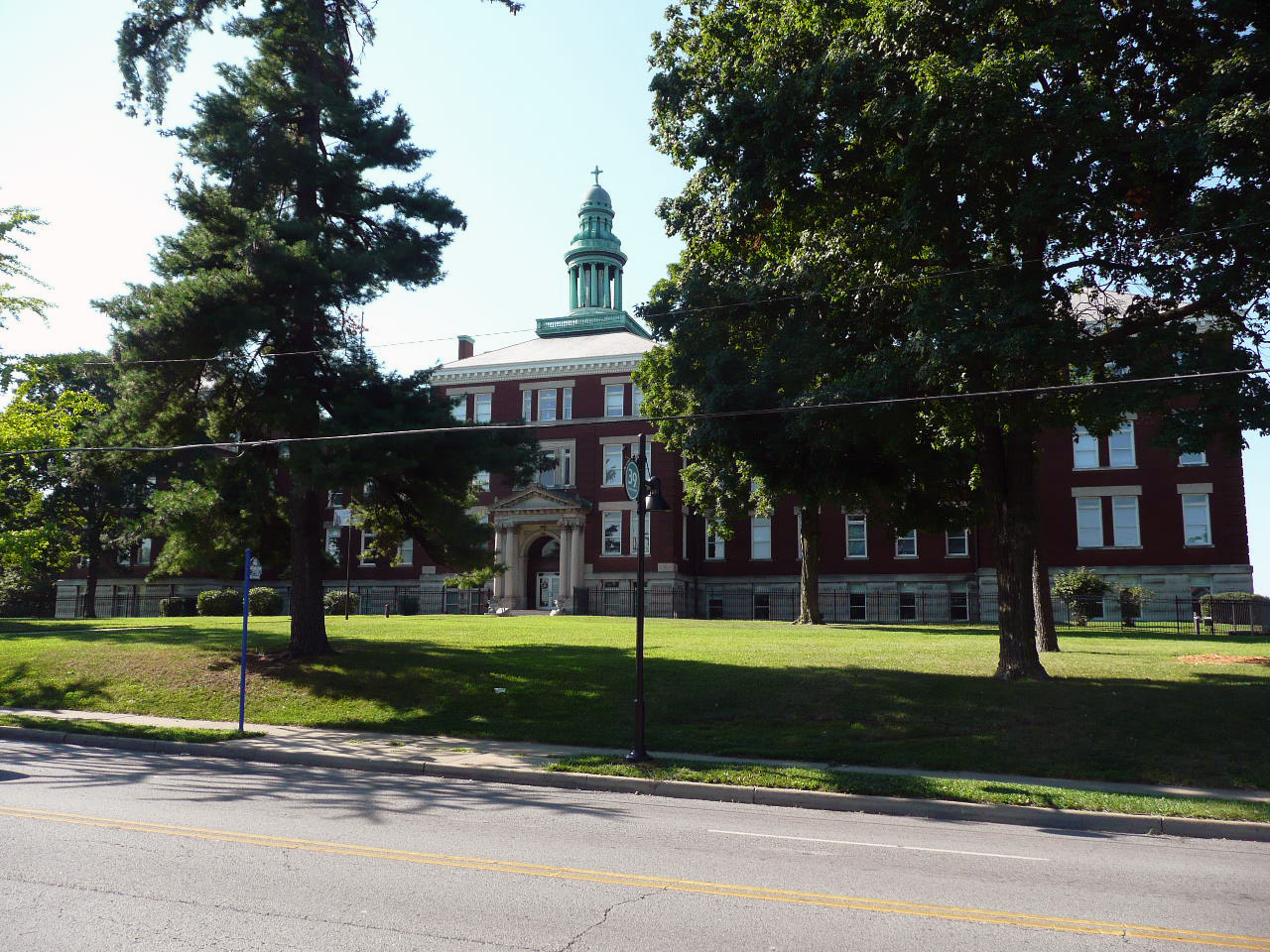
- The building in August 2015
- Interactive map of The Loretto
- Former names: Loretto Academy
- Address: 1111 W. 39th St.
- Location: Kansas City, Missouri
- Owner: Loretto Redevelopment Corp.

Construction
- Built: 1902

Website
- Official website
- Loretto Academy
- U.S. National Register of Historic Places
- Location within Missouri Location within the United States
- Coordinates: 39°3′35″N 94°36′1″W
- Built: 1902
- Architect: Barnett, Haynes & Barnett
- Architectural style: Colonial Revival
- NRHP reference No.: 83001009
- Added to NRHP: July 28, 1983

The Loretto is a multipurpose venue in the Westport neighborhood of Kansas City, Missouri. It was adapted from a former girls' academy known as Loretto Academy, dedicated in 1904 as a "boarding and day school for girls." It is named after the Sisters of Loretto, who established a presence in Kansas City in 1899.

== History ==
The land upon which Loretto Academy was built was purchased in September 1902 by Mother M. Praxedes Carty. The architect of Loretto Academy, Thomas P. Barnett of Barnett, Haynes & Barnett, was soon after appointed the architect of the Cathedral Basilica of St. Louis.

The academy was the site of a fire in 1909 at a Halloween party; three students lost their lives when a paper dress became ignited by a lit jack-o'-lantern.

Loretto Academy admitted its first black student in September 1947.

The Academy moved to 12411 Wornall Road in 1966.

== Subsequent uses ==
In 1966 the site was sold to Calvary Bible College, who owned it for two decades; it then passed through the hands of three owners until a 1993 foreclosure. By then it had been listed on the National Register of Historic Places for a decade.

As The Loretto, it currently hosts weddings in the historic cathedral chapel and wedding receptions in the ballroom. The building also offers apartments and offices. Its current owner, Loretto Redevelopment Corp., taking advantage of a tax abatement, has had plans for further redevelopment since 1996; as of 2011, those plans include "a hotel conversion, a small office space facing Mercier Street and two small rental buildings" on the 6-acre (2.4 ha) site.

== See also ==
- Loretto Academy (St. Louis, Missouri), also NRHP-listed
