= Glenn House (Cape Girardeau, Missouri) =

Historic house in Missouri, United States

- U.S. National Register of Historic Places
- U.S. Historic district – Contributing property
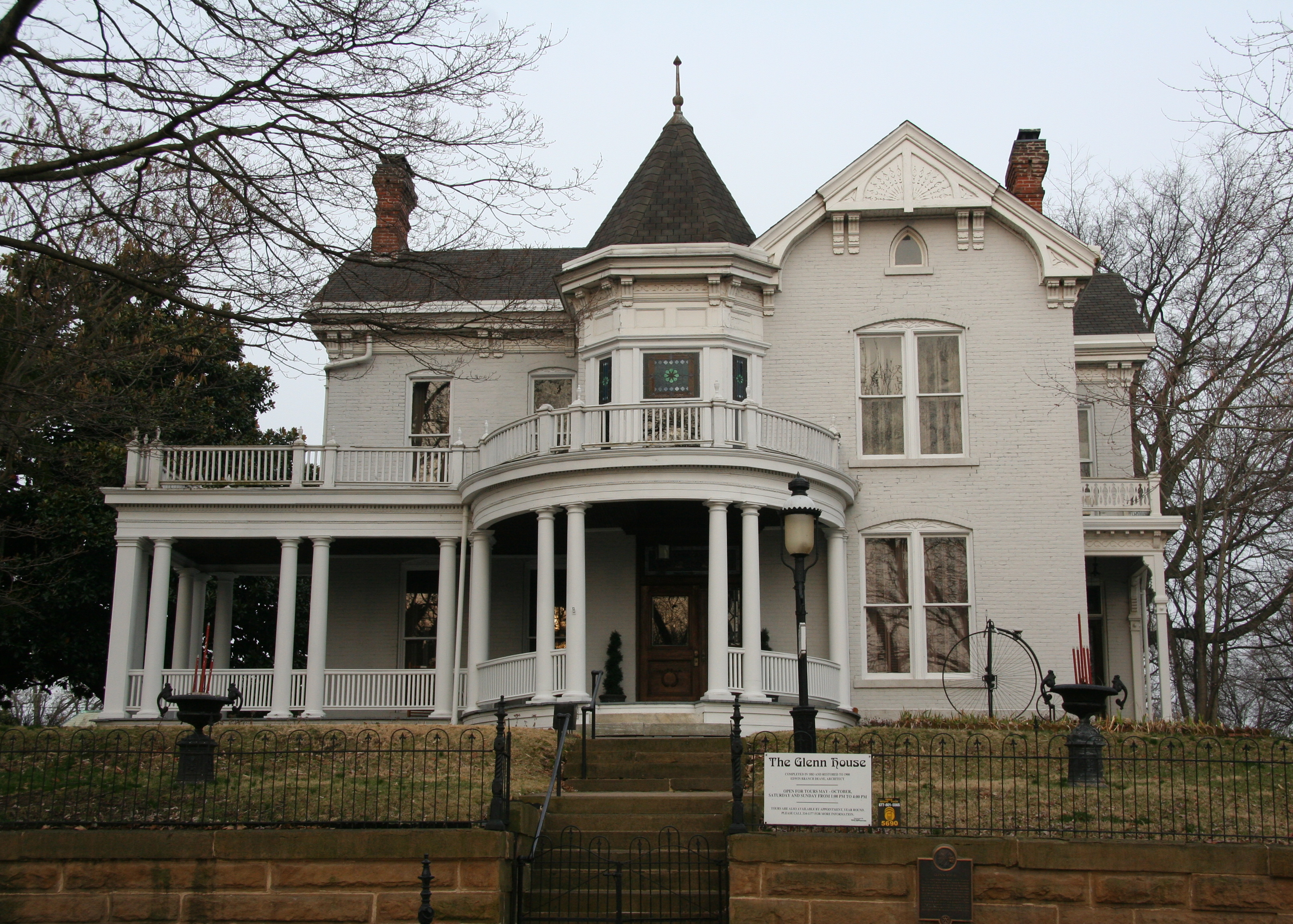

- Location within Missouri Location within the United States
- Location: 325 South Spanish Street, Cape Girardeau, Missouri
- Coordinates: 37°17′53″N 89°31′14″W
- Built: 1883
- Architect: Edwin Branch Deane
- Architectural style: Late Victorian
- NRHP reference No.: 79001354
- Added to NRHP: October 11, 1979

The Glenn House is a historic home located at Cape Girardeau, Missouri. It was built in 1883, and is a two-story, Late Victorian style painted brick dwelling. It is topped by cross-gabled and pyramidal roofs. It features a verandah with Tuscan order columns, turret, and oriel window. The house has been restored and open to the public by the Historical Association of Greater Cape Girardeau, Inc.

It was listed on the National Register of Historic Places in 1979. It is located in the Courthouse-Seminary Neighborhood Historic District.
