= Robert Felix and Elma Taylor Wichterich House =

Historic house in Missouri, United States

- U.S. National Register of Historic Places
- U.S. Historic district – Contributing property
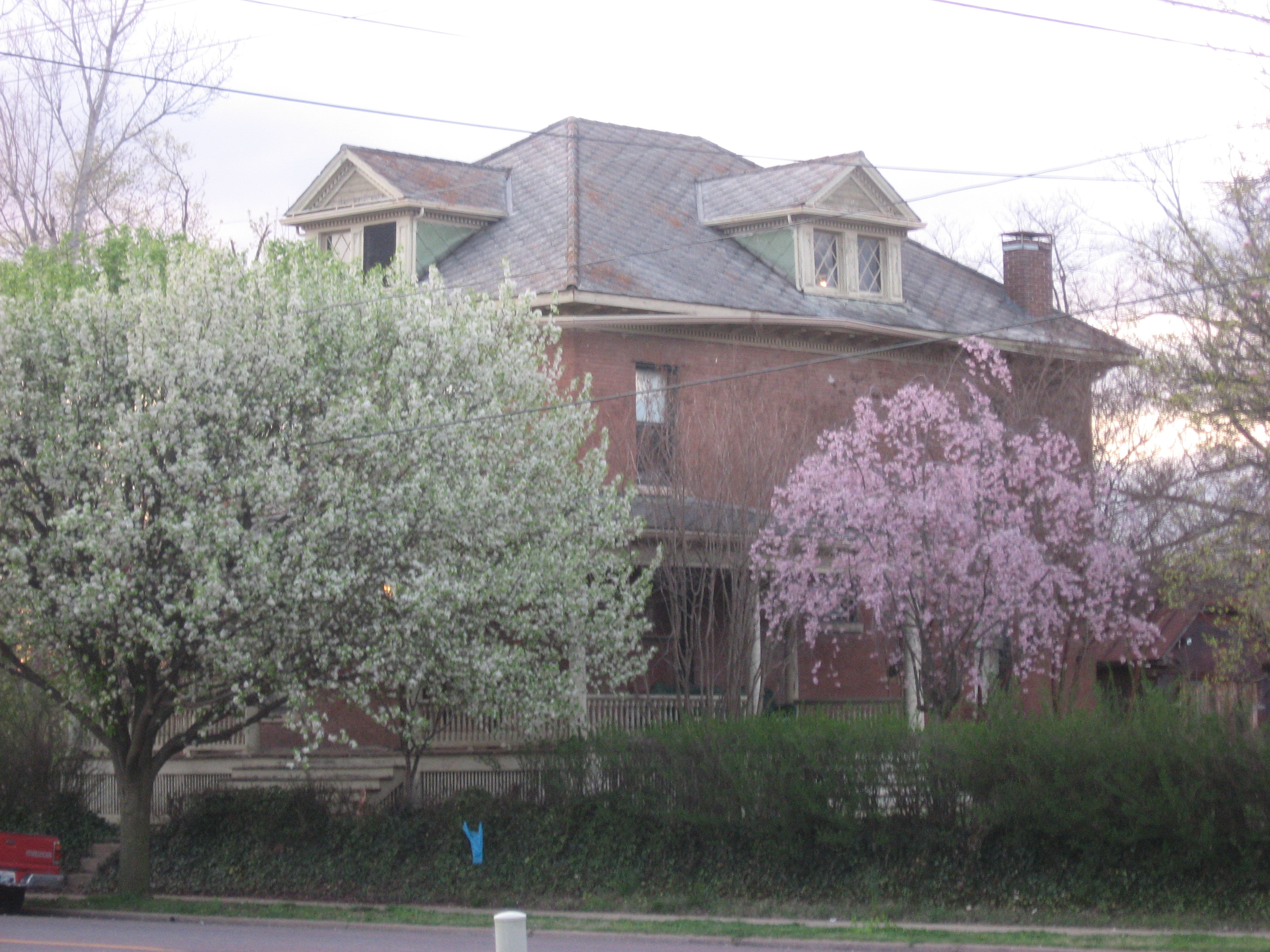
- Robert Felix and Elma Taylor Wichterich House, April 2013

- Location within Missouri Location within the United States
- Location: 300 Good Hope St., Cape Girardeau, Missouri
- Coordinates: 37°17′57″N 89°31′18″W
- Area: less than one acre
- Built: 1906
- Architectural style: Colonial Revival
- NRHP reference No.: 99000987
- Added to NRHP: August 12, 1999

Robert Felix and Elma Taylor Wichterich House, also known as the Wichterich-Lang House, is a historic home located at Cape Girardeau, Missouri. It was built in 1906, and is a 2 1/2-story, brick dwelling with Colonial Revival style design elements. It features a fine wraparound verandah with Ionic order capitals and a pedimented gable with a Palladian window.

It was listed on the National Register of Historic Places in 1999. It is located in the Courthouse-Seminary Neighborhood Historic District.
