= George Boardman Clark House =

Historic house in Missouri, United States

- U.S. National Register of Historic Places
- U.S. Historic district – Contributing property
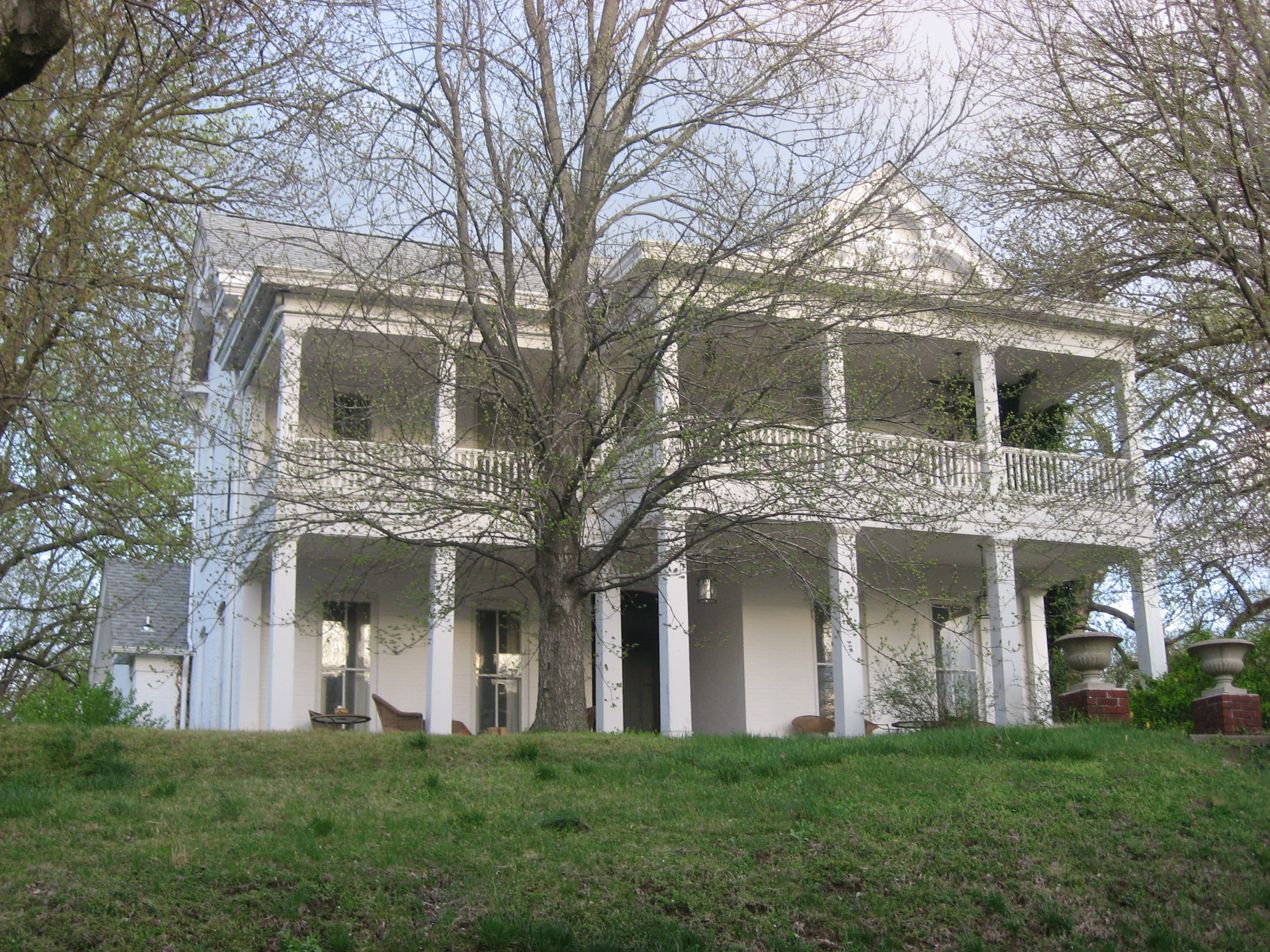
- George Boardman Clark House, April 2013

- Location within Missouri Location within the United States
- Location: 6 S. Fountain St., Cape Girardeau, Missouri
- Coordinates: 37°18′12″N 89°31′21″W
- Area: 1.2 acres (0.49 ha)
- Built: 1882, 1909
- Architect: Deane, Edwin Branch
- Architectural style: Queen Anne
- NRHP reference No.: 94000738
- Added to NRHP: July 22, 1994

George Boardman Clark House, also known as Kellerman House, is a historic home located at Cape Girardeau, Missouri. It was built in 1882, and is a two-story, "T"-plan, Queen Anne style painted brick dwelling. It sits on a sandstone foundation. About 1909, the original one-story front porch was replaced with a two-story porch.

It was listed on the National Register of Historic Places in 1994. It is located in the Courthouse-Seminary Neighborhood Historic District.
