= McFarlin Building =

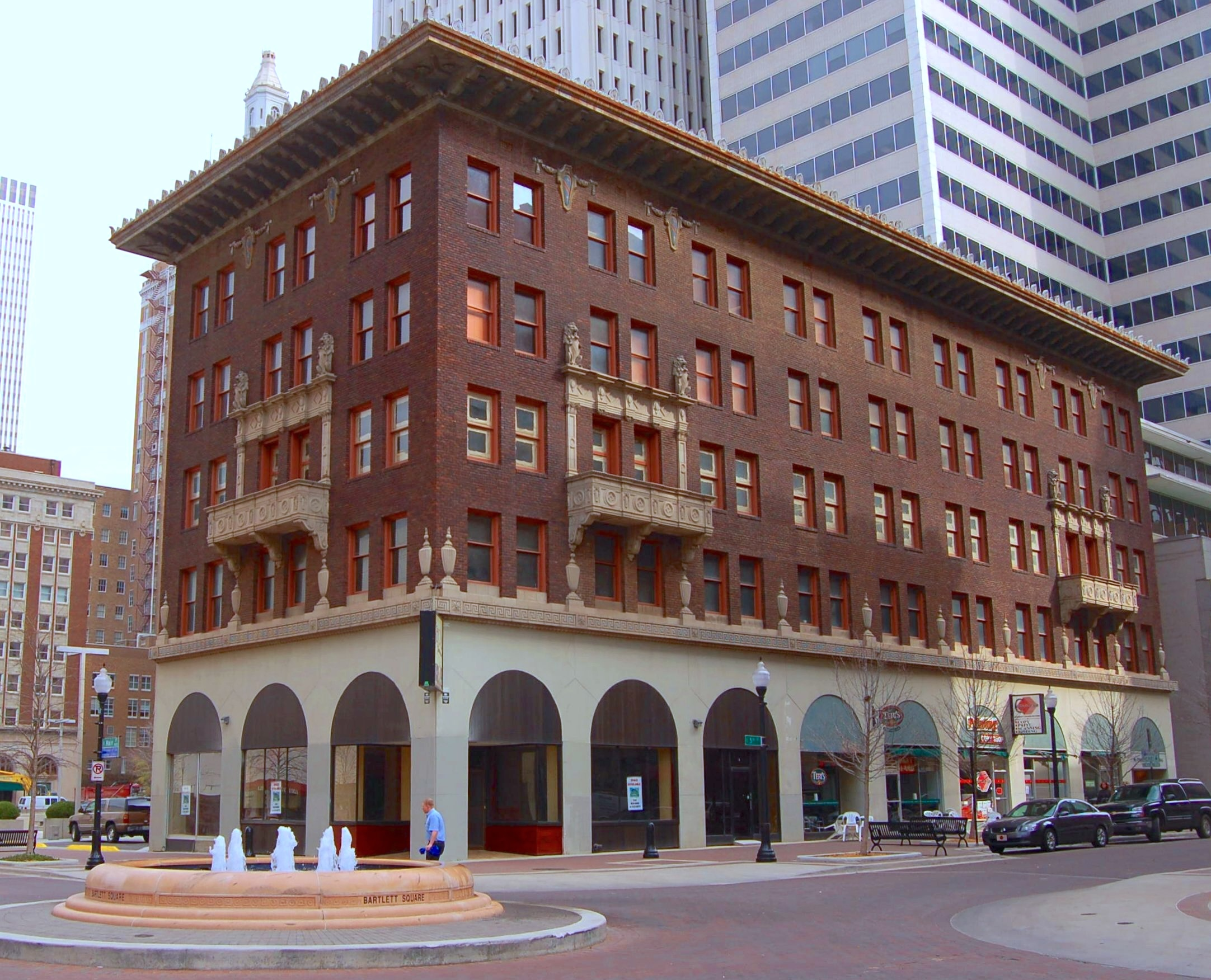
- McFarlin Building, 11 E. 5th St., built 1918. Listed on National Register of Historic Places
- Interactive map of the McFarlin Building area

General information
- Status: Completed
- Type: Office
- Architectural style: Florentine
- Location: 11 E. Fifth Street (Fifth and Main), Tulsa, Oklahoma
- Coordinates: 36°09′06″N 95°59′23″W
- Completed: 1918
- Client: Robert McFarlin (original)
- Owner: McFarlin Building LLC

Height
- Height: 64.34 feet

Technical details
- Floor count: 5

Design and construction
- Architecture firm: Barnett-Haynes-Barnett (St. Louis, MO)
- Main contractor: Brussel Viterbo

The McFarlin Building is a general office building located on the northeast corner of Fifth Street and Main (Bartlett Square) in downtown Tulsa, Oklahoma. The five-story building was built in 1918 by Barnett, Haynes & Barnett for oilman Robert M. McFarlin, and is on the National Register of Historic Places. It is also a contributing property for the Oil Capital Historic District.

== Description ==
According to the Tulsa Preservation Commission, the McFarlin Building was constructed in Florentine style architecture, using a 19th-century style. It still retains the original red brick facade above the ground floor, and is decorated with three stone balconies, stylized lions and urns. It is topped by a wide cornice supported with Victorian brackets. TPC noted that the interior has been altered so substantially that it no longer retains its architectural integrity.

The image on this page was taken from the Fifth and Main intersection. In front of the McFarlin Building is the decorative fountain that is a feature of Bartlett Square.

== Usage ==
The Halliburton-Abbott department store was the first tenant, but later moved to a larger building at Fifth and Boulder, and is now defunct. (Note: The subsequent Halliburton-Abbott building later housed Sears Roebuck, who vacated it when the store moved to a suburban mall. The building was razed and replaced by a grade-level parking lot.)

Skaggs Drug Store occupied the ground floor during the 1950s.

A project to renovate the building for mixed retail and residential use was initiated in 2006. At the time, the building interior was said to be badly deteriorated. The ground floor facade has been changed several times, but has never lost its historical identity.

== National Register of Historic Places ==
The McFarlin Building was added to National Register of Historic Places on December 6, 1979. It is listed under Category C. The NRIS number is 79002030.

== See also ==
National Register of Historic Places Inventory-Nomination Form: McFarlin Building. December 6, 1979.
