= Marquette Hotel (St. Louis) =

- U.S. National Register of Historic Places
- Location: 1734 Washington Ave., St. Louis, Missouri
- Coordinates: 38°39′58″N 93°18′23″W
- Area: 0.4 acres (0.16 ha)
- Built: 1906
- Built by: Zolnay, George Julian
- Architect: Barnett, Haynes & Barnett
- Architectural style: Chicago, Classical Revival
- NRHP reference No.: 85002557
- Added to NRHP: September 26, 1985

The Marquette Hotel was a historic hotel located at the southeast corner of 18th Street and Washington Avenue at 1734 Washington Avenue in St. Louis, Missouri. The building was designed by architects Barnett, Haynes & Barnett. Construction began in 1906, and it was completed in 1907. The hotel was ten stories high and featured extensive terra-cotta and limestone ornamentation and bay windows.

The hotel remained in business until 1977. It was listed in the National Register of Historic Places in 1985, but it was demolished soon after this in 1988 to make room for a parking lot. The hotel had also been known as the Milner Hotel. Soon after to was demolished, many similar old downtown buildings in St. Louis like this one were converted into condominiums and apartments.

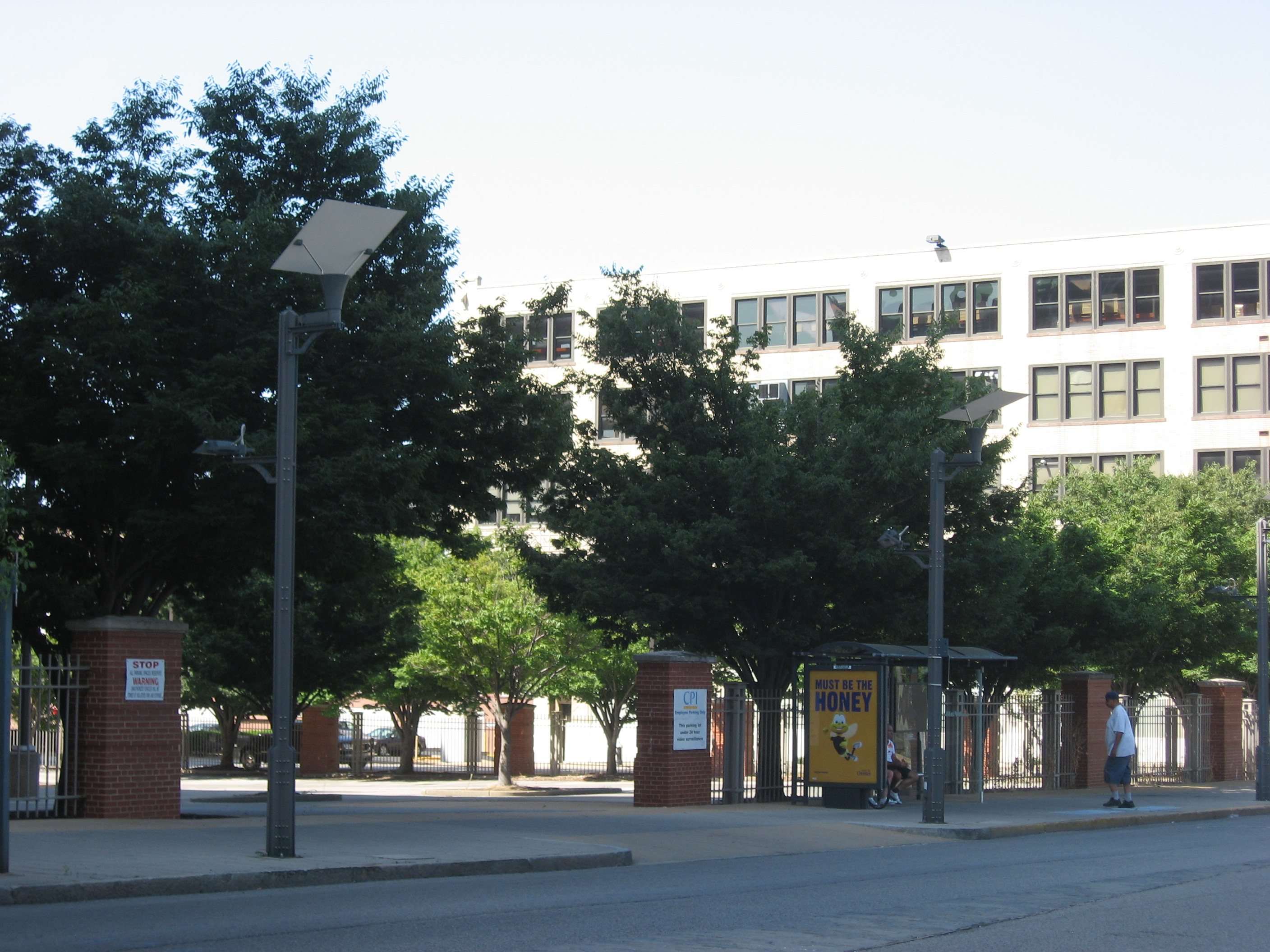
Site of hotel

It is still listed on the National Register despite having been demolished, according to the National Register Information System.

It was 150 by 116 feet (46 m × 35 m) in plan. The building was enriched by terra cotta ornamentation designed by George Julian Zolnay, including a bacchanalian themed entrance-way "replete with horned and bearded masks and draped grape leaf garlands enframing a cartouche with the Marquette Hotel monogram."
