= Hamilton Place Historic District =

Historic district in Missouri, United States

- U.S. National Register of Historic Places
- U.S. Historic district
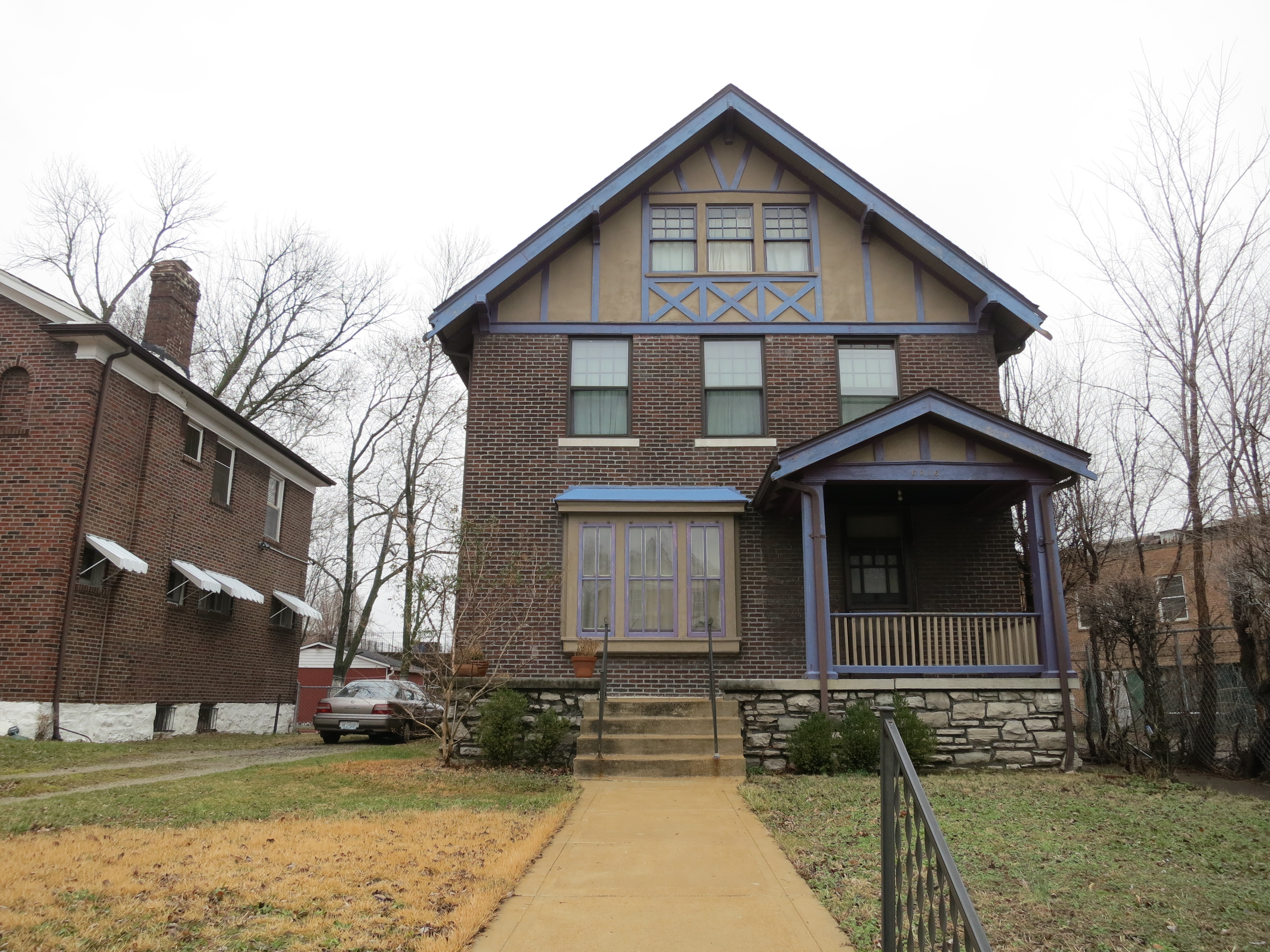

- Location within St. Louis Location within Missouri Location within the United States
- Location: 5900-6000 blocks of Enright, Cates, and Clemens, St. Louis, Missouri
- Coordinates: 38°39′26″N 90°17′33″W
- Area: 43 acres (17 ha)
- Architect: Barnett, Haynes & Barnett; et al.
- Architectural style: Late Victorian, Late 19th and 20th Century Revivals
- NRHP reference No.: 05001164
- Added to NRHP: October 15, 2005

The Hamilton Place Historic District is a 43-acre (17 ha) historic district in St. Louis, Missouri that was listed on the National Register of Historic Places in 2005. It includes 160 contributing buildings, including along the 5900-6000 blocks of Enright, Cates, and Clemens. It includes Late Victorian architecture and Late 19th and 20th Century Revivals architecture, and it includes work by architects Barnett, Haynes & Barnett.

The district included 160 contributing resources and 13 non-contributing buildings on portions of six city blocks near the western edge of St. Louis. It included 105 single-family residences, 12 apartment buildings or tenements, 11 two- or four-family flats, 31 garages/stables, and one non-residential building, an auto repair shop.
