= Marquette Hotel (Springfield, Missouri) =

- U.S. National Register of Historic Places
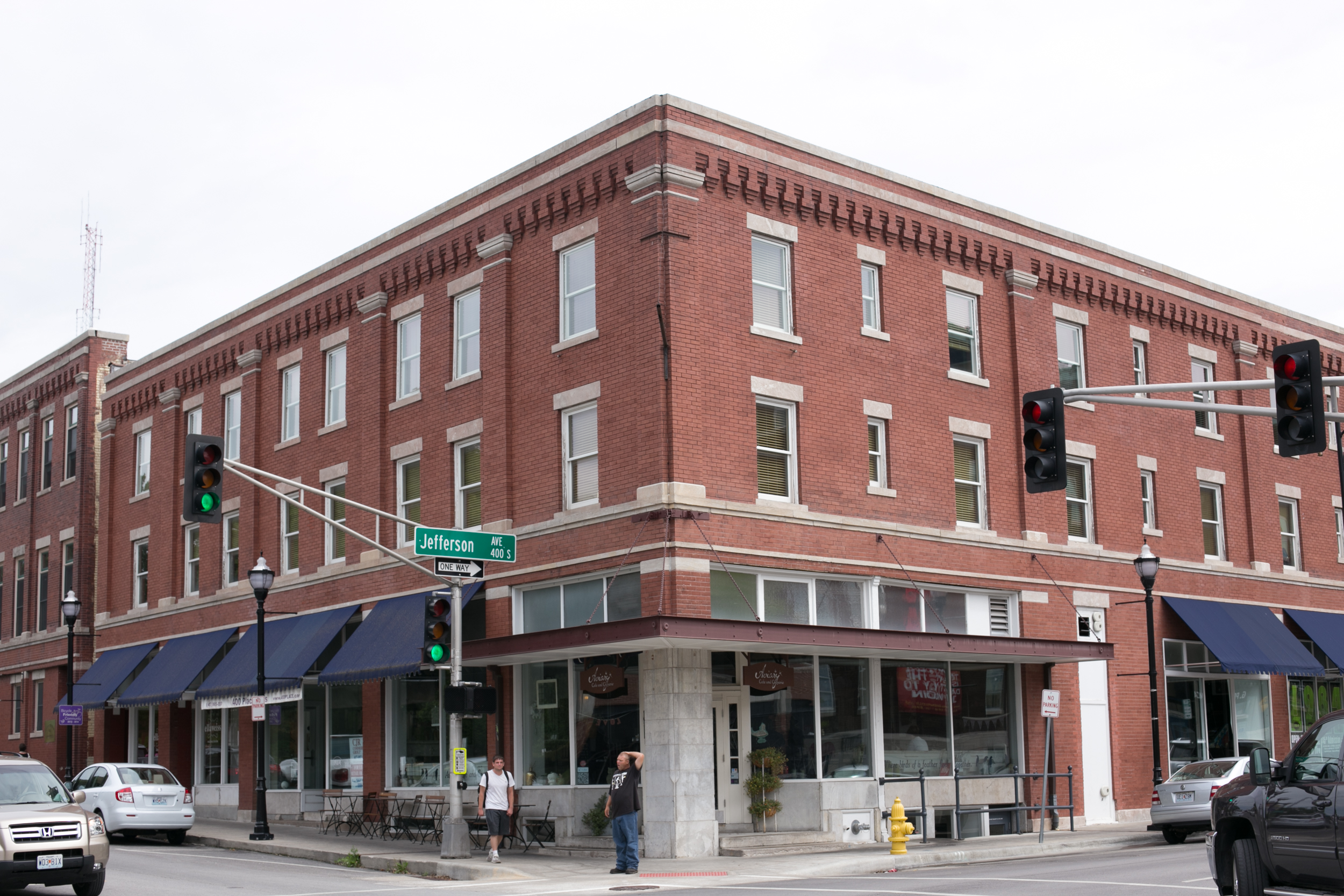
- Marquette Hotel, September 2014

- Location within Missouri Location within the United States
- Location: 400 East Walnut, Springfield, Missouri
- Coordinates: 37°12′25″N 93°17′21″W
- Area: less than one acre
- Built: 1906, 1918
- Architectural style: Two Part Commercial
- MPS: Springfield, Missouri MPS (Additional Documentation)
- NRHP reference No.: 00000431
- Added to NRHP: May 5, 2000

Marquette Hotel, also known as the Springfield Business College and Hotel State, is a historic hotel building located in Springfield, Missouri, United States. Built about 1906, it is a three-story, brick commercial building. It has a recessed entrance. It originally housed a business college, then converted to a hotel in 1918. It continued as a hotel until the mid-1980s.

It was added to the National Register of Historic Places in 2000.
