= Cape Girardeau Commercial Historic District =

Historic district in Missouri, United States

- U.S. National Register of Historic Places
- U.S. Historic district
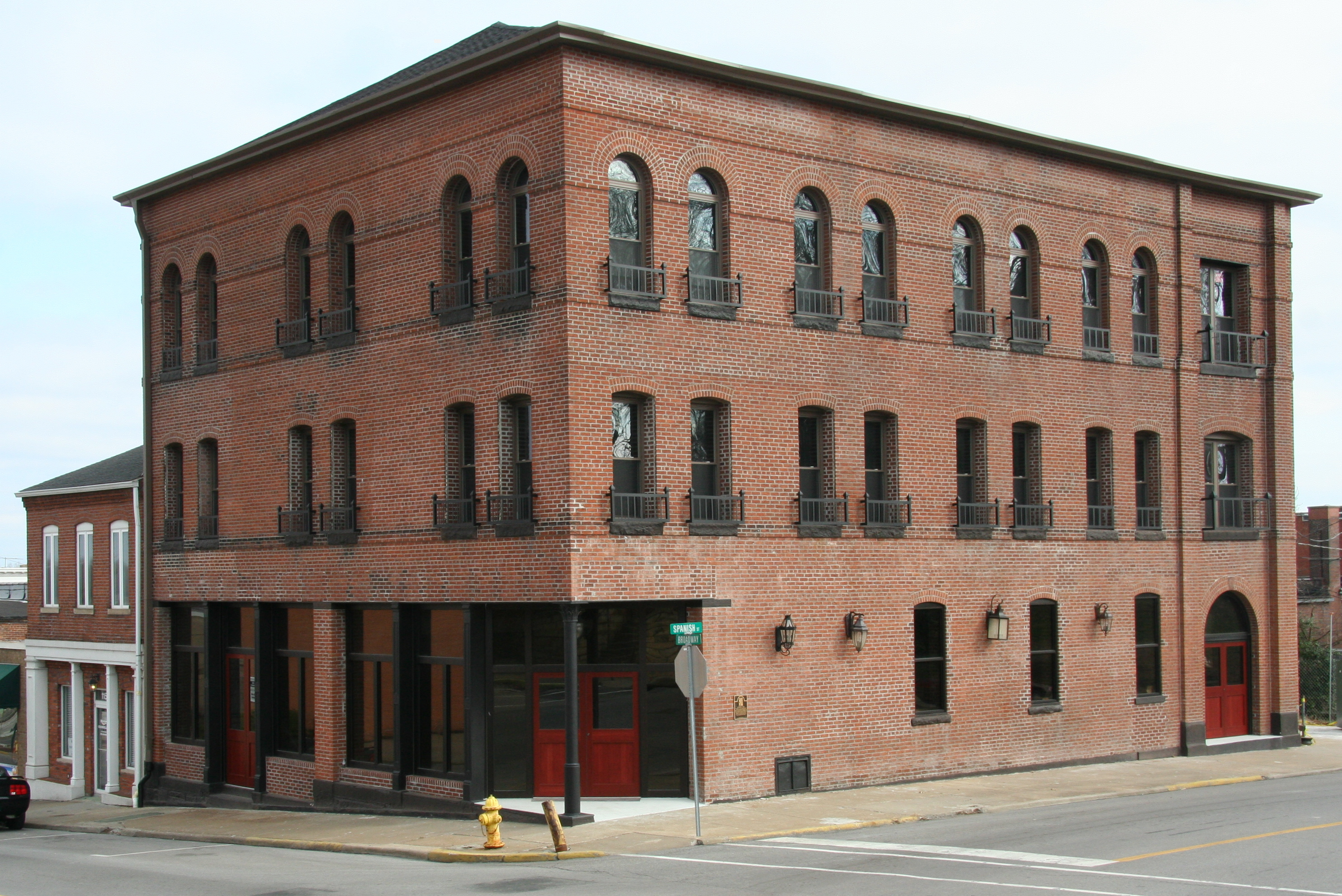
- Masonic Temple Building at the intersection of Broadway and Spanish Streets

- Location within Missouri Location within the United States
- Location: 100 Blk. of N. Main St. and 100 Blk. of Broadway (original); 101 N. Main St. (increase I); 127 N. Water St. (increase II), Cape Girardeau, Missouri
- Coordinates: 37°18′26″N 89°31′6″W
- Area: 1.6 acres (0.65 ha) (original) less than one acre (increase I) less than one acre (increase II)
- Built: 1981 (increase I) and 1870 (increase II)
- Architect: Legg, Jerome B.; Ossenkop, Henry (increase I)
- Architectural style: Italianate, Mission/Spanish Revival, et al. (original); Romanesque (increase I) two-part commercial block (increase II)
- MPS: Cape Girardeau, Missouri MPS
- NRHP reference No.: 00000820, 07000683, and 08000808
- Added to NRHP: July 20, 2000 (original); July 11, 2007 (increase I); August 29, 2008 (increase II)

Cape Girardeau Commercial Historic District is a national historic district located in Cape Girardeau, Missouri. In 2000, the area listed was 1.6 acres (0.65 ha) and included 17 contributing buildings. In a first increase, an 1891 contributing building at 101 North Main Street was added. The building was designed by Jerome B. Legg and Henry Ossenkop in the Romanesque style. In a second increase, three contributing buildings dating from 1870 were added. The two increases added 0.9 acres (0.36 ha) each to the original listed area.

It was listed on the National Register of Historic Places in 2000 with boundary increases in 2007 and 2008.
