= Himmelberger and Harrison Building =

- U.S. National Register of Historic Places
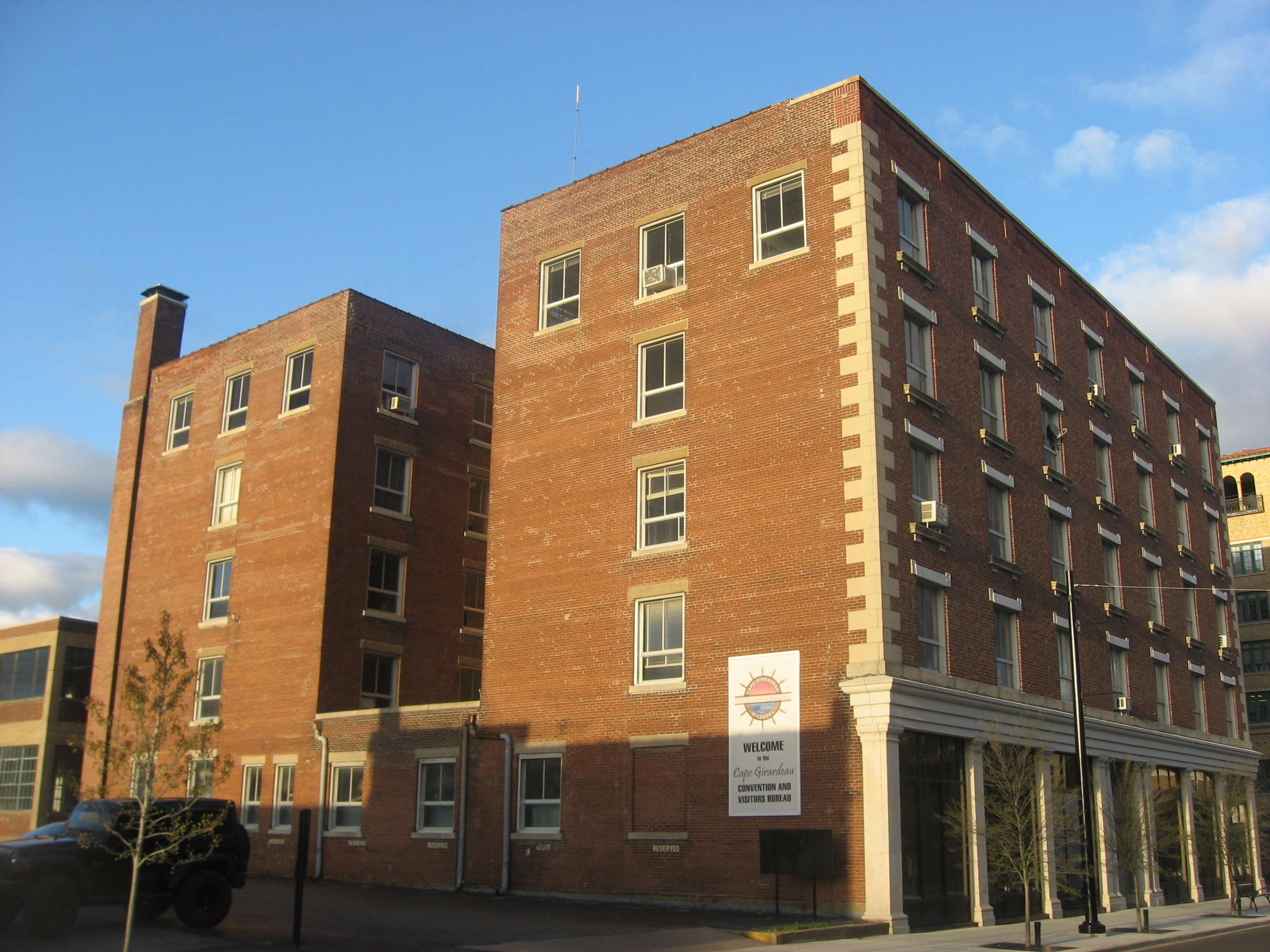
- Himmelberger and Harrison Building, April 2013

- Location within Missouri Location within the United States
- Location: 400 Broadway, Cape Girardeau, Missouri
- Coordinates: 37°18′30″N 89°31′20″W
- Area: less than one acre
- Built: 1907-1908
- Architect: Barnett, Haynes and Barnett
- Architectural style: Late 19th And 20th Century Revivals
- MPS: Cape Girardeau, Missouri MPS
- NRHP reference No.: 03000653
- Added to NRHP: July 17, 2003

Himmelberger and Harrison Building, also known as the Liberty National Life Building and H & H Building, is a historic commercial building located at Cape Girardeau, Missouri. It was built in 1907–1908, and is a five-story red brick, H-shaped structure. It is a steel reinforced concrete building on a poured concrete foundation with a full basement. It features a recessed marble entry flanked by round Tuscan order columns.

It was listed on the National Register of Historic Places in 2003.
