= Big Hill (disambiguation) =

The Big Hill is on the Canadian Pacific Railway main line in British Columbia, Canada.

Big Hill may also refer to:

== Australia ==
- Big Hill, New South Wales, a rural locality
- Big Hill, Victoria (City of Greater Bendigo), a rural locality
- Big Hill, Victoria (Surf Coast Shire), a coastal locality

== Canada ==
- Big Hill (Alberta), a hill
- Big Hill, Nova Scotia, a community on Cape Breton Island
- Nels Nelsen Hill, originally Big Hill, a ski jumping hill in Revelstoke, British Columbia

== United States ==
- Big Hill (Idaho), a hill east of Montpelier
- Big Hill, Indiana, an unincorporated community in Rochester Township, Fulton County
- Big Hill (Missouri), a hill in St. Francois County
- Big Hill (Carter County, Montana), a mountain in Carter County
- Big Hill (Custer County, Montana), a mountain in Custer County
- Big Hill Farmstead Historic District, in Jackson, Missouri
- Big Hill Formation, a geological formation in Michigan
- Big Hill Lake, near Parsons, Kansas
