= National Register of Historic Places listings in Logan County, Oklahoma =

Location of Logan County in Oklahoma

This is a list of the National Register of Historic Places listings in Logan County, Oklahoma.

This is intended to be a complete list of the properties and districts on the National Register of Historic Places in Logan County, Oklahoma, United States. The locations of National Register properties and districts for which the latitude and longitude coordinates are included below, may be seen in a map.

There are 18 properties and districts listed on the National Register in the county, including 1 National Historic Landmark.

This National Park Service list is complete through NPS recent listings posted March 27, 2026.

== Current listings ==
	Name on the Register	Image	Date listed	Location	City or town	Description
1	Benedictine Heights Hospital	Benedictine Heights Hospital	December 4, 2017 (#100001869)	2000 W. Warner St. 35°52′51″N 97°26′57″W	Guthrie	
2	Carnegie Library	Carnegie Library	June 21, 1971 (#71000666)	Oklahoma Ave. and Ash St. 35°52′48″N 97°25′05″W	Guthrie	
3	Co-Operative Publishing Company Building	Co-Operative Publishing Company Building	March 7, 1973 (#73001564)	Harrison Ave. and 2nd St. 35°52′36″N 97°25′40″W	Guthrie	
4	Angie Debo House	Angie Debo House	April 4, 1996 (#96000379)	200 Oklahoma Ave. 36°09′18″N 97°37′23″W	Marshall	
5	Excelsior Library	Excelsior Library	March 15, 2016 (#16000087)	323 S. 2nd St. 35°52′31″N 97°25′39″W	Guthrie	
6	Guthrie Armory	Guthrie Armory	September 8, 1994 (#94001083)	720 E. Logan; 35°53′01″N 97°25′00″W	Guthrie	
7	Guthrie Historic District	Guthrie Historic District	June 13, 1974 (#74001664)	Roughly bounded by Oklahoma Ave., S. Broad St., and Harrison Ave. 35°52′41″N 97°25′31″W	Guthrie	
8	Langston Jail		March 7, 2025 (#100011493)	205 Drexel Street; 35°56′36″N 97°15′03″W	Langston	
9	Langston University Cottage Row Historic District		January 7, 1999 (#98001593)	Southwestern corner of the Langston University campus 35°56′36″N 97°15′47″W	Langston	
10	Logan County Courthouse	Logan County Courthouse	October 26, 1984 (#84003141)	301 E. Harrison St. 35°52′36″N 97°25′19″W	Guthrie	
11	Methodist Church of Marshall	Methodist Church of Marshall	September 28, 1984 (#84003143)	Off State Highway 74; 36°09′17″N 97°37′22″W	Marshall	
12	Morris House		September 8, 1994 (#94001082)	221 Tolson Boulevard; 35°56′38″N 97°15′17″W	Langston	No longer extant per Google Street View.
13	Mulhall United Methodist Church	Mulhall United Methodist Church	June 22, 1984 (#84003145)	Bryant and Craig Sts. 36°03′48″N 97°24′13″W	Mulhall	
14	Oklahoma State Bank Building		June 22, 1984 (#84003146)	Baty and Main Sts. 36°03′54″N 97°24′26″W	Mulhall	
15	Ozark Trails-Indian Meridian Obelisk	Ozark Trails-Indian Meridian Obelisk	June 12, 2017 (#100001074)	Jct. of Logan & E. Washington Aves. 35°56′32″N 97°14′49″W	Langston	
16	St. Joseph Convent and Academy		December 19, 1979 (#79002000)	Due south of current-day Oklahoma SH-33; 35°52′17″N 97°27′39″W	Guthrie	Demolished in 1995
17	Scottish Rite Temple	Scottish Rite Temple	April 9, 1987 (#87000503)	900 E. Oklahoma; 35°52′41″N 97°24′48″W	Guthrie	
18	Melvin B. Tolson House		March 6, 2026 (#100012781)	316 N. Tolson St. 35°56′42″N 97°15′20″W	Langston	

== See also ==
- List of National Historic Landmarks in Oklahoma
- National Register of Historic Places listings in Oklahoma
