= Guthrie Historic District (Guthrie, Oklahoma) =

Historic district in Oklahoma, United States

- U.S. National Register of Historic Places
- U.S. National Historic Landmark District
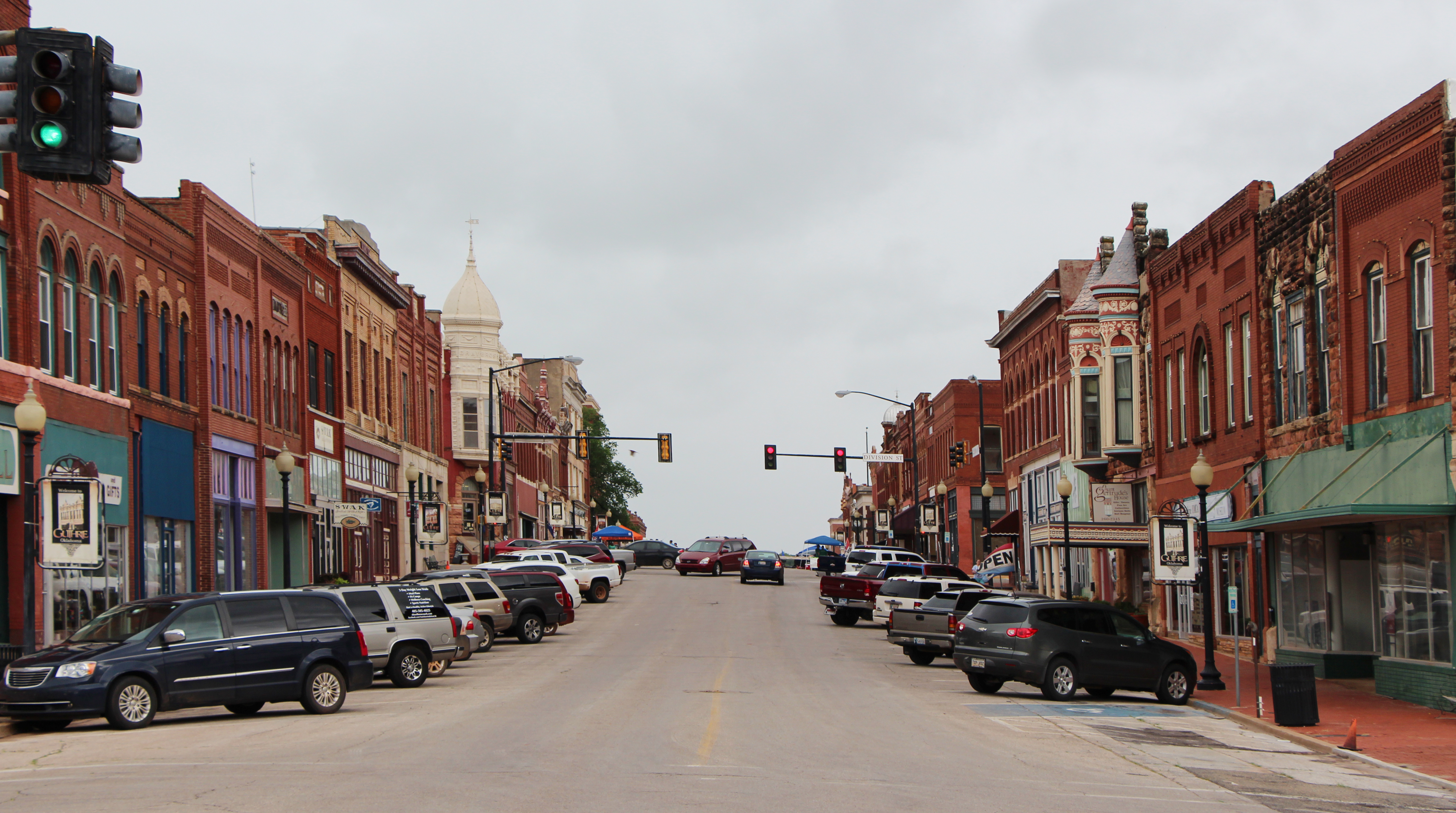
- Guthrie Historic District, Guthrie, Oklahoma

- Location within Oklahoma Location within the United States
- Location: Guthrie, Oklahoma
- Coordinates: 35°52′48″N 97°25′31″W
- Area: 31 acres (13 ha)
- Architect: Multiple
- Architectural style: Multiple
- NRHP reference No.: 74001664

Significant dates
- Added to NRHP: June 13, 1974
- Designated NHLD: January 20, 1999

The Guthrie Historic District (GHD) is a National Historic Landmark District encompassing the commercial core of Guthrie, Oklahoma, US. According to its National Historic Landmark Nomination it is roughly bounded by Oklahoma Avenue on the north, Broad Street on the east, Harrison Avenue on the south, and the railroad tracks on the west; it also includes 301 W. Harrison Avenue. The National Historic Landmarks Program on-line document describes the boundaries as "14th Street, College Avenue, Pine Street and Lincoln Avenue. One building, the Logan County Courthouse, is at 301 E. Harrison Avenue, outside the main boundaries of the GHD," This article relies on the former source, which is more detailed. According to the 1998 nomination, the proposed district covered 31 acres (13 ha). The nomination included 112 resources, classed as 69 contributing buildings, 38 non-contributing buildings, 1 non-contributing structure and 3 noncontributing objects. It was declared a National Historic Landmark in 1999 for its historic significance as the first capital of the Oklahoma Territory and of Oklahoma.

== Period of significance ==
The period of significance is defined as 1889 to 1910, when most of the contributing buildings were erected. The most notable architect at the time was Joseph Pierre Foucart, who designed many of the buildings in the table below. The city of Guthrie was founded in 1889 in the wake of the Land Rush of 1889 which opened lands of the Indian Territory to white settlement. Guthrie promptly became the capital of the Oklahoma Territory. When Oklahoma became a state on November 16, 1907, Guthrie became the first state capital, a role it held until 1910, when the seat of government moved to Oklahoma City. Guthrie thereafter declined in commercial importance and changed little for many years. The GHD was assessed to have a high degree of historic integrity.

== Architectural styles ==
- Late Victorian
- Italianate
- Romanesque
- Late 19th & Early 20th Century Revivals
- Beaux Arts
- Classical Revival
- Late 19th & Early 20th Century American Movements
- Commercial Style

The district includes buildings separately listed on the National Register of Historic Places, including:

- Carnegie Library
- Co-operative Publishing Company Building
- Logan County Courthouse

=== Building classifications ===
As part of the application process, all of the significant buildings within the proposed district boundaries were labeled as either "Contributing" or "non-contributing". Buildings in the former category had to meet the following criteria:

- Built between 1893 and 1910;
- Had not lost their historical character through remodeling or conversion to other uses

The table presented here identifies the buildings contained by the GHD, as defined in the NRHP application. Data are largely derived from text descriptions in the application.

Notable buildings in Guthrie Historic District
Name	Address	Year Built	Architectural Style	Notes
Union Station Santa Fe Station in Guthrie, Oklahoma	403 W. Oklahoma Avenue	1902	Late 19th- and Early 20th- Century American Movements	Contributing; also known as the Old Santa Fe Depot of Guthrie
State Capital Publishing Company Building State Capital Publishing Company Building, Guthrie, Oklahoma	301 West Harrison Avenue	1902	Commercial Style	Contributing; listed on the National Register in 1973 as the Co-Operative Publishing Company Building
Victor Block Victor Block, Guthrie, Oklahoma	202-206 W. Harrison Avenue	1893	Richardsonian Romanesque	Contributing; Operates as a publishing museum
Tontz and Hirschi Block Tontz and Hirschi Block, Guthrie, Oklahoma	111-113 W. Harrison Avenue	1891	Late Victorian	Contributing
Foucart Building Foucart Building, Guthrie, Oklahoma	115 W. Harrison Avenue	1891	Romanesque Revival with Gothic Revival influences	Contributing
Sneed-Coffin Building Sneed Coffin Building, Guthrie, Oklahoma	123 W. Harrison Ave	1904	Romanesque Revival	Contributing
Gray Brothers Building Gray Brothers Building, Guthrie, Oklahoma	101-103 W. Oklahoma Avenue,	1890 & 1893	Richardsonian Romanesque	Contributing; Attributed to Joseph Foucart.
Bonfils Building Bonfils Building, Guthrie, Oklahoma	107 S. Second Street	1890	Richardsonian Romanesque	Contributing
De Ford Building De Ford Building, Guthrie, Oklahoma	116 S. Second Street	1890	Richardsonian Romanesque	Contributing
Baxter and Cammack's Livery Stable Baxter and Cammack's Livery Stable, Guthrie, Oklahoma	215 S. Second Street	ca. 1901-1903	Italianate	Contributing
Coyle and Smith Building Coyle & Smith Building, Guthrie, Oklahoma	206-208 S. Second Street	1893	Italianate	Contributing
C.W. Hopkins Building	222 S. Second Street	1910	Romanesque Revival	Contributing
Little Victor	115 S. First Street	1893	Italianate	Contributing
116 S. First Street	116 S. First Street	1903	Late Victorian	Non-Contributing
Wachob Building	215 S. First Street	1910	Italianate	Contributing
Olds House	223 S. First Street	1899	National Folk Front Gable	Contributing
109-111 S. Division Street	109-111 S. Division Street	1894	Italianate	Contributing
Logan County Courthouse Former Capitol, now Logan County Courthouse, Guthrie, Oklahoma	301 E. Harrison Avenue	1907	Neo-Classical Revival/Second Renaissance Revival	Contributing; Discontiguous District
Tannery Amphitheater	300 Block W. Cleveland Avenue, South Side	1980s	Modern Movement	Non-contributing because of age
Bumble's Baggage and More	330 W. Oklahoma Avenue	1912	Commercial Style	Non-contributing due to age
314 W. Oklahoma Avenue	314 W. Oklahoma Avenue	Unknown date after period of significance	Commercial Style	Non-contributing due to age
Swan Hotel	317 W. Oklahoma Avenue	1903	Romanesque Revival	Noncontributing due to later alterations incompatible with historic appearance
311 W. Oklahoma Avenue	311 W. Oklahoma Avenue	1904	No style	Noncontributing because original second story was removed later
BancFirst Drive-Up	200 Block of W. Oklahoma Avenue	1970s	No style	Non-contributing due to age
Daniel's Drugs	206 W. Oklahoma Avenue	Pre-1908	No style	Noncontributing due to later alterations incompatible with historic appearance
First National Bank	202-204 W. Oklahoma Avenue	1923	Beaux Arts	Noncontributing due to insufficient age
Old U.S. Courthouse and Post Office	201 W. Oklahoma Avenue	1903 & 1914	Beaux Arts	Noncontributing due to insufficient age
Gaffney Building Gaffney Building, Guthrie, Oklahoma	212-214 W. Oklahoma Avenue	1890	Architectural style not classified	Contributing, houses the Oklahoma Frontier Drug Store Museum
J. B. Beadles Building J.B. Beadles Building, Guthrie, Oklahoma	210 W. Oklahoma Avenue	Pre-1900	Italianate	Contributing
Adler Building Adler Building, Guthrie, Oklahoma	109 W. Oklahoma Avenue	1893	Italianate	Contributing
Farquharson Building Farquharson Building, Guthrie, Oklahoma	114 W. Oklahoma Ave.	1907	Late Victorian	Contributing
Schnell Building Schnell Building, Guthrie, Oklahoma	115 W. Oklahoma Avenue	1893	Italianate	Contributing
Bierer-Anderson Building Bierer Anderson Building, Guthrie, Oklahoma	116-118 W. Oklahoma Avenue	1898	Richardsonian Romanesque	Contributing
Osage Building, Guthrie, Oklahoma Osage Building, Guthrie, Oklahoma	117-119 W. Oklahoma Avenue	1902	Italianate	Contributing
Wicks Building	120-122 W. Oklahoma Avenue	1892/1893	Commercial Style	Noncontributing due to 1950s alterations
Cassidy Building Cassidy Building, Guthrie, Oklahoma	113 W. Oklahoma Avenue	1911	Commercial Style with Romanesque Revival	Noncontributing due to age
Oklahoma Building Oklahoma Building, Guthrie, Oklahoma	102-106 E. Oklahoma Avenue	Pre-1900	Romanesque Revival	Contributing
118 E. Oklahoma Avenue.	118 E. Oklahoma Avenue.	1898-1901	Romanesque Revival	Noncontributing due to later alterations
122 E. Oklahoma Avenue	122 E. Oklahoma Avenue	Unknown	Commercial style	Noncontributing due to age
Filtsch Building	101-103 E. Oklahoma Avenue	1905	Commercial style	Noncontributing due to later alterations
Kress Building Kress Building, Guthrie, Oklahoma	105-107 E. Oklahoma Avenue	1918	Classical Style with Commercial style influences	Noncontributing due to insufficient age
109 E. Oklahoma Avenue	109 E. Oklahoma Avenue	1922	Commercial Style	Noncontributing due to insufficient age
DeSteiguer Block DeSteiguer Block, Guthrie, Oklahoma	110-112 E. Oklahoma Avenue	1890	Late Victorian/Romanesque	Contributing; Attributed to Joseph Foucart
First Capital Bank	224 E. Oklahoma Avenue	1964	Neo-Classical Revival	Noncontributing due to insufficient age
217 E. Oklahoma Avenue	217 E. Oklahoma Avenue	Unknown	Commercial Style	Noncontributing due to insufficient age
Townhouse Motel	223 E. Oklahoma Avenue	Unknown	Commercial Style	Noncontributing due to insufficient age
Beland Building Beland Building, Guthrie, Oklahoma	118 W. Harrison Avenue	1920	Commercial Style	Noncontributing due to age
Actons Furniture and Pianos	110-112 W. Harrison Avenue	1915	Unidentified style	Noncontributing due to age
Patterson Building (now Pollard Theatre) Patterson Building (now Pollard Theatre), Guthrie, Oklahoma	120-122 W. Harrison Ave.	1903	Romanesque Revival	Contributing
Kaleidoscope Gallery	121 W. Harrison Avenue	1984	Neo-Victorian	Noncontributing because of age
Guthrie News Leader Building Guthrie News Leader Building, Guthrie, Oklahoma	107-109 W. Harrison Avenue	1891	Neo-Romanesque Revival	Noncontributing due to the 1976 renovations that extensively altered the original appearance.
105 W. Harrison Avenue	105 W. Harrison Avenue	1895	No style	Noncontributing due to the loss of the original second story
121 N. Second Street	121 N. Second Street	1948	Commercial Style/Modern Movement	Non-Contributing
Time Out Travel	113 N. Second Street	1924	Unidentified style	Noncontributing due to age
City Hall and Police Station	101 N. Second Street/306 W. Oklahoma Avenue	1996	Neo-Victorian	Noncontributing due to age
103 S. Second Street	103 S. Second Street	1913	Italianate	Noncontributing because of age
Hurley Plumbing and Heating	105 S. Second Street	1923	Commercial Style	Noncontributing due to age
Fire Department	109-113 S. Second Street	1931	Commercial Style	Noncontributing due to age
Willis Building	118 S. Second Street	1914	Commercial Style	Noncontributing due to age
Buckboard Emporium	120 S. Second Street	1910	Commercial Style	Noncontributing due to these alterations
217 S. Second Street	217 S. Second Street	Unknown date	No distinctive style	Noncontributing due to age
219 S. Second Street	219 S. Second Street	Unknown date	No distinctive style	Contributing
107 N. First Street	107 N. First Street	1923	Commercial Style	Noncontributing due to age
Stan's Auto	201 S. Division	1928	No distinctive tyle	Noncontributing due to age
Unnamed building just south of alley (behind 122 E. Oklahoma Avenue).	122 E. Oklahoma Avenue	Unknown date	No distinctive style	Noncontributing due to insufficient age
Unnamed building just south of alley	100 Block N. Wentz Street, East Side	Unknown date	Vernacular Front Gable Commercial	Noncontributing due to insufficient age
Blue Bell Bar Blue Bell Bar, Guthrie, Oklahoma	224 W. Harrison Avenue	1903	Commercial Style	Contributing

== See also ==
- List of National Historic Landmarks in Oklahoma
- National Register of Historic Places listings in Logan County, Oklahoma
