= Daviess County Courthouse =

Daviess County may refer to:

- Daviess County Courthouse (Indiana), Washington, Indiana
- Daviess County Courthouse (Missouri), Gallatin, Missouri
