= P. H. Weathers =

American architect

Patrick Henry Weathers (born 1870), commonly known as P.H. Weathers, was an American architect of Jackson, Mississippi.

He was born in Alabama. He studied architecture under architect Eugene T. Heiner of Houston, Texas. By 1886 he had done work in association with his uncle, L.M. Weathers.

A number of his works are listed on the U.S. National Register of Historic Places.

Works include:

- Robert H. Babington House, 608 Main St., Franklinton, LA (Weathers, P.H.), NRHP-listed
- Cape Girardeau County Courthouse (c. 1906–1908), in the Jackson Uptown Commercial Historic District, Jackson, Missouri, NRHP-listed
- Central Fire Station, built 1904, S. President St., Jackson, MS (Weathers, P.H.), NRHP-listed
- Daviess County Courthouse, Public Sq., Gallatin, MO (Weathers, P.H.), NRHP-listed
- Ellis County Courthouse, Town Sq., Arnett, OK (Weathers, P.H.), NRHP-listed
- Lee County Courthouse (Mississippi), Court St. between Spring and Broadway, Tupelo, MS (Weathers, Patrick Henry), NRHP-listed
- Logan County Courthouse, 301 E. Harrison St., Guthrie, OK (Weathers, P.H.), NRHP-listed
- Marion County Courthouse and Jail, Courthouse Sq., Columbia, MS (Weathers, Patrick Henry), NRHP-listed
- Old Washington County Courthouse, 400 Frank Phillips Blvd., Bartlesville, OK (Weathers, P.H.), NRHP-listed
- Sieber Grocery and Apartment Hotel, 1305-1313 N. Hudson Ave., Oklahoma City, OK (Weathers, Patrick H.), NRHP-listed
- Stoddard County Courthouse, Prairie and Court Sts., Bloomfield, MO (Weathers, P.H.), NRHP-listed
- Tensas Parish Courthouse, Courthouse Sq., St. Joseph, LA (Weathers, P.H.), NRHP-listed
- Warden's House, Penitentiary Blvd and West St., McAlester, OK (Weathers, P.H.), NRHP-listed

== See also ==
- Old Tishomingo County Courthouse, NE corner of Quitman and Liberty Sts., Iuka, MS (Weathers, L.M.), NRHP-listed
