= The Cash-Book Journal =

Newspaper in Jackson, Missouri

- Publisher: Gina Raffety
- Founded: 1977
- Language: English
- Headquarters: 210 W. Main, P.O. Box 369, Jackson, MO 63755, US
- Website: thecash-book.com

The Cash-Book Journal is a newspaper from Jackson, Missouri. The newspaper was created in 1977 by a merger of the Jackson Journal and the Cape County Post and Cash-Book. Along with Missouri state representative Marvin E. Proffer (1931-2019), the newspaper was largely created by Gerald Wayne Jones (1940-2025) who served as Cape Girardeau County presiding commissioner from 1995 until 2011. His daughter Gina Raffety has been the newspaper's publisher. Gerald Jones also worked with Jerry Reppert to create Cape Central Publishing Company in order to print the newspaper. Jerry Reppert has owned as many as 18 newspapers near southern Illinois.
