= Central Fire Station (Jackson, Mississippi) =

- U.S. National Register of Historic Places
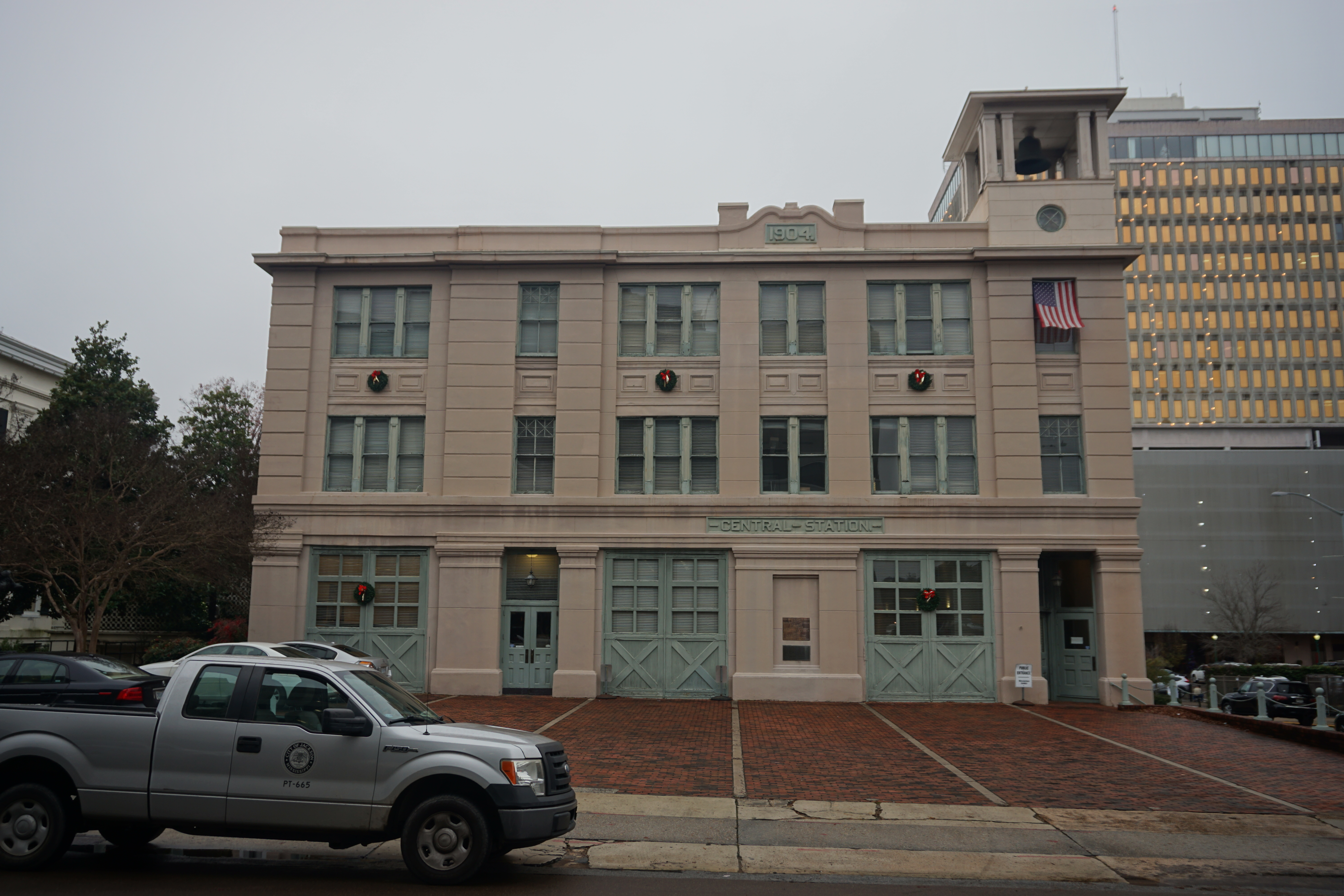

- Location within Mississippi
- Location: S. President St., Jackson, Mississippi
- Coordinates: 32°17′53″N 90°10′55″W
- Area: less than one acre
- Built: 1904-05
- Built by: G.T. Hallas & Co.
- Architect: P.H. Weathers
- NRHP reference No.: 75001045
- Added to NRHP: October 30, 1975

The Central Fire Station in Jackson, Mississippi, located on S. President St., was built in 1904. It was listed on the National Register of Historic Places in 1975.

It is a three-story stuccoed brick building with a parapet, which is 60 by 80 feet (18 m × 24 m) in plan. It was designed by architect P.H. Weathers.
