= Oklahoma Odd Fellows Home at Checotah =

- U.S. National Register of Historic Places
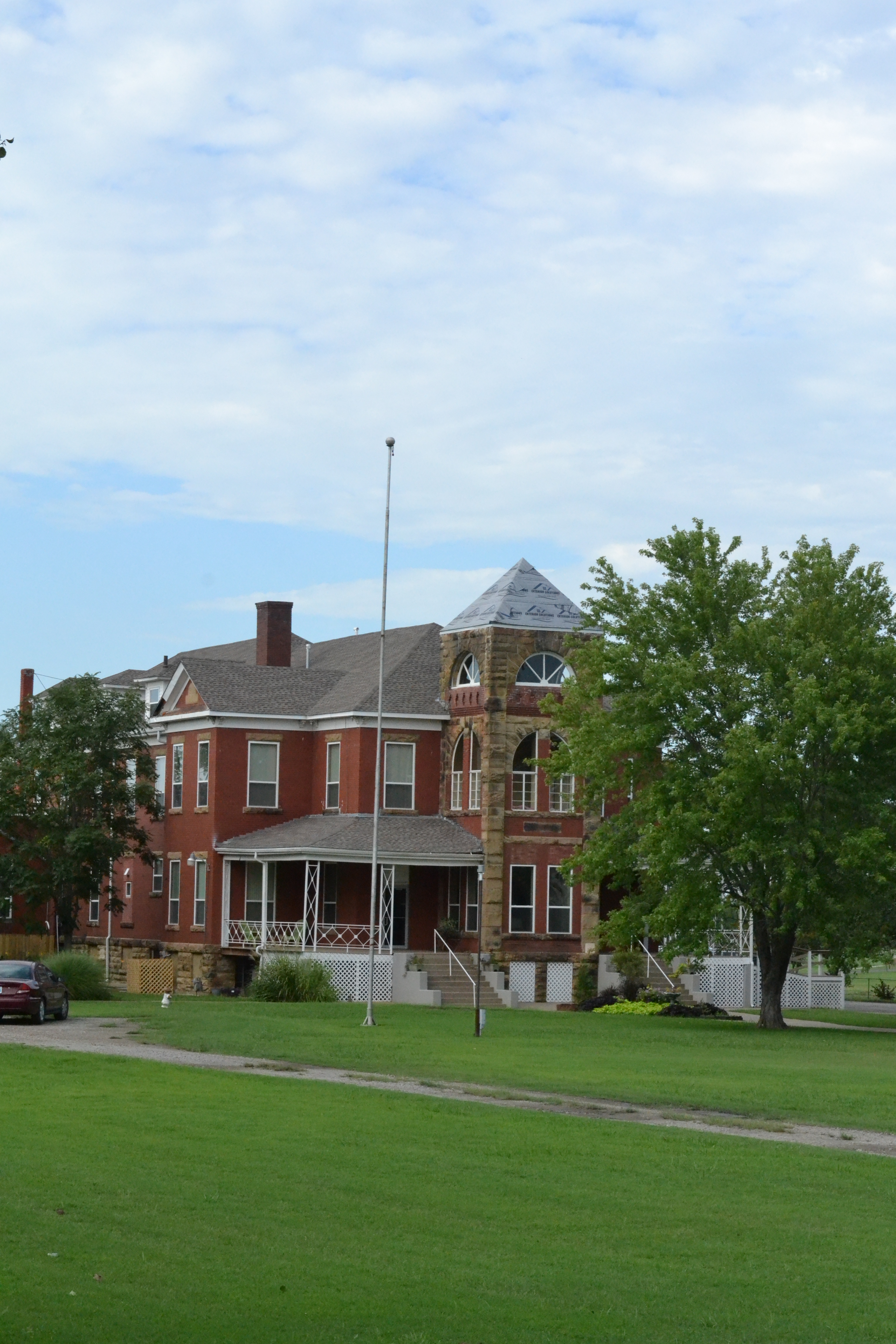

- Location within Oklahoma Location within the United States
- Location: 211 West North St., Checotah, Oklahoma
- Coordinates: 35°28′46″N 95°31′15″W
- Area: 6 acres (2.4 ha)
- Built: 1902, c. 1905, 1922, 1962
- Built by: A.D. Patterson Construction Co.
- Architect: Joseph Foucart (original); M.T. Hardin (1922 addition)
- Architectural style: Romanesque, Bungalow/Craftsman
- NRHP reference No.: 01000660
- Added to NRHP: June 14, 2001

The Oklahoma Odd Fellows Home at Checotah is a historical building complex in Checotah, Oklahoma, central United States, now on 6 acres (2.4 ha). It includes Romanesque Revival and Bungalow/Craftsman architecture. Also known as Odd Fellows Widows and Orphans Home and as Checotah Odd Fellows Home, it served historically as institutional housing and as educational related housing.

It was listed on the National Register of Historic Places in 2001. The listing includes one contributing building and two other contributing structures.

The Home, started in 1902 on 160 acres (65 ha) of land donated by William Gentry, was expanded in c. 1905, and again in 1922 and in 1962. It was designed originally by architect Joseph P. Foucart, who may also have designed the compatible c. 1905 expansion. M.T. Hardin designed the Bungalow/Craftsman addition in 1922.

The Carmen IOOF Home, in Carmen, is another NRHP-listed Odd Fellows retirement home in the state.
