= Frank Hilton Greer =

Member of the Oklahoma Territorial House from the 25th district
- In office 1892–1895
- Preceded by: Position established
- Succeeded by: G. W. Bradfield

Personal details
- Born: July 21, 1862; Leavenworth, Kansas
- Died: August 8, 1933 (aged 71)
- Political party: Republican

Frank Hilton Greer was an American journalist, Sooner, and politician from the U.S. state of Oklahoma who founded the Daily State Capitol newspaper and served in the Oklahoma Territorial Legislature between 1892 and 1894.

== Early life and move to Oklahoma ==
Frank Hilton Greer was born on July 21, 1862, to Samuel W. Greer and Clothilda Hilton. Samuel was the superintendent of schools for Leavenworth, Kansas and served as the Kansas Territory superintendent of public instruction. He died in 1880, leaving Clothilda to move with her children to Winfield, Kansas to stay with her oldest child who owned the Winfield Courier. Frank wanted his own newspaper and planned to move to Oklahoma Territory. He learned from railroad executives the future location of towns and planned to open a newspaper in Guthrie. He married Blanche Byers and then left for Oklahoma hiding on a freight train to stake his claim in the Unassigned Lands the day before the Land Run of 1889, making him a Sooner.

== Oklahoma ==
=== Territory ===
Greer founded the Daily State Capitol in Guthrie, Oklahoma in 1889. The first three issues of the paper were printed in Leavenworth, Kansas and shipped to Oklahoma. He alo published the Weekly State Capital and the Oklahoma Farmer His papers propagandized for Guthrie and the settlement of Oklahoma Territory and became a leading influence in the Oklahoma Republican Party. His printing company, the State Capital Company, bought the first Linotype machine to be brought to the territory and built the Co-operative Publishing Company Building. He was elected to the Oklahoma Territorial Legislature in 1892 and helped found the Oklahoma Historical Society, serving on its board from 1896 to 1906. He was a founder of the Oklahoma Territorial Press Association and president from 1904 to 1905.

=== Statehood and later life ===
Greer designed the official Territorial Seal for Oklahoma Territory, which was later incorporated into the Oklahoma State Seal. His first wife died in 1906 and he moved to Tulsa in 1911 where he married Laura Leigh Hanson. He worked for the Fourth Liberty Loan Campaign in Tulsa during World War I and died on August 8, 1933. He was Episcopalian.

== Legacy ==
He was adopted into the Oklahoma Journalism Hall of Fame in 1982. The Oklahoma Chapter of the Society of Professional Journalists named their lifetime achievement award after Greer.
