= Frizel-Welling House =

Historic house in Missouri, United States

- U.S. National Register of Historic Places
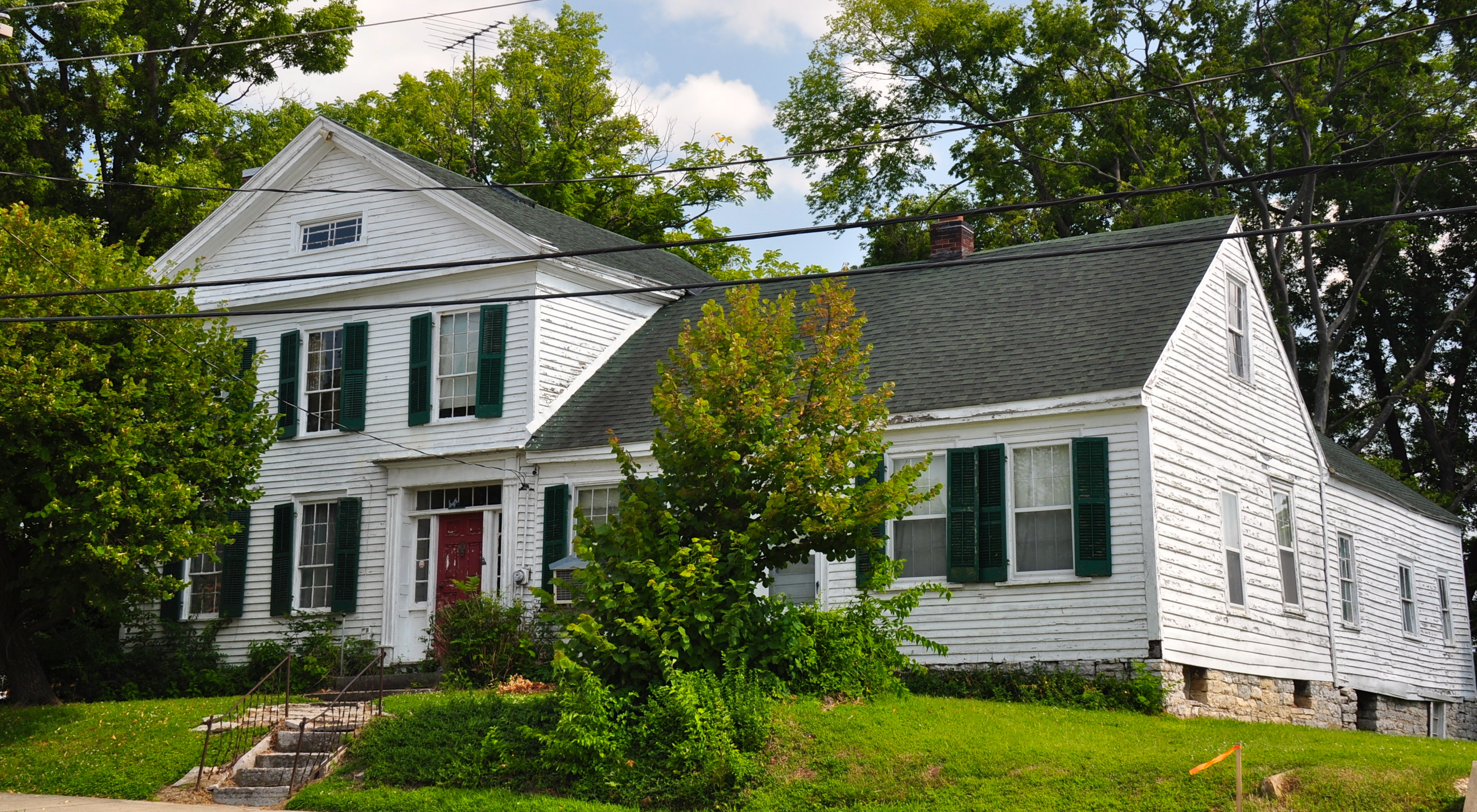
- Frizel-Welling House, July 2014

- Location within Missouri Location within the United States
- Location: 209 W. Main St., Jackson, Missouri
- Coordinates: 37°22′57″N 89°40′10″W
- Area: less than one acre
- Built: 1818, 1838
- Architectural style: Greek Revival
- NRHP reference No.: 99000742
- Added to NRHP: June 25, 1999

Frizel-Welling House, also known as the Charles Welling House and Joseph Frizel House, is a historic home located at Jackson, Cape Girardeau County, Missouri. It was built in 1838, and is a 2 1/2-story, three-bay, Greek Revival style frame dwelling with a 1 1/2-story wing constructed in 1818. It has a front gable roof with pedimented front gable.

It was listed on the National Register of Historic Places in 1999.
