= Tensas Parish Courthouse =

- U.S. National Register of Historic Places
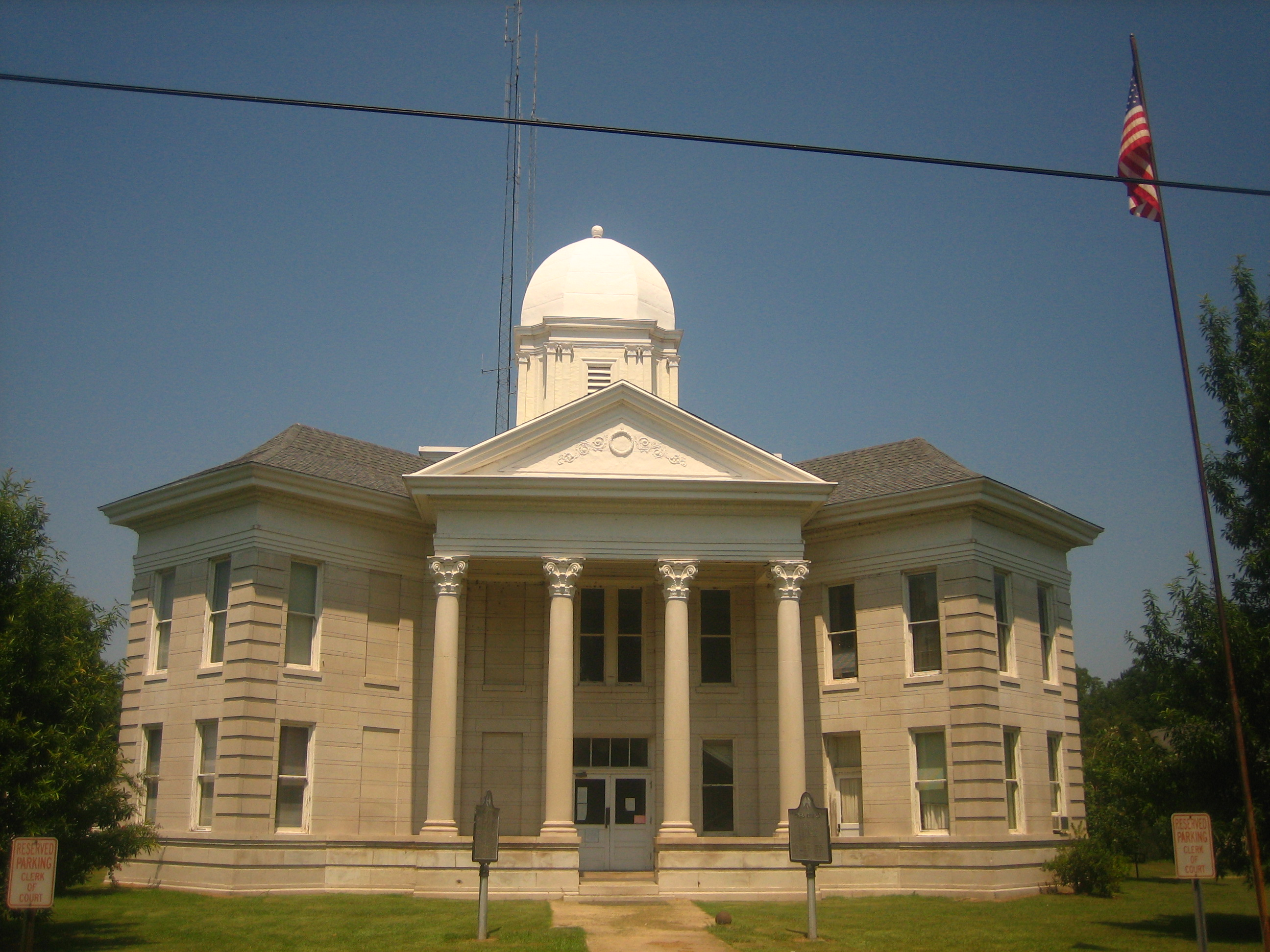

- Location within Louisiana Location within the United States
- Interactive map showing the location of Tensas Parish Courthouse
- Location: Courthouse Sq., St. Joseph, Louisiana
- Coordinates: 31°54′48″N 91°14′9″W
- Area: 8 acres (3.2 ha)
- Built: 1905
- Built by: Lewman and Company
- Architect: P.H. Weathers
- NRHP reference No.: 79001093
- Added to NRHP: March 30, 1979

The Tensas Parish Courthouse on Courthouse Square in St. Joseph, the parish seat of Tensas Parish, Louisiana, was built in 1905. It was listed on the National Register of Historic Places in 1979.

Architect P.H. Weathers designed it.

Its main entrance has a tetrastyle pedimented portico; it has porticoes on its other two main facades as well. The courthouse is topped by an English Baroque style cupola which has a pressed tin balustrade. Though the cupola once had a clock with four faces it has been removed. As of the NRHP listing in 1979, the second floor courtroom retained all of its original features, including paneled judge's bench, witness stand, and jury box.
