= McKendree Chapel =

Historic church in Missouri, United States

- U.S. National Register of Historic Places
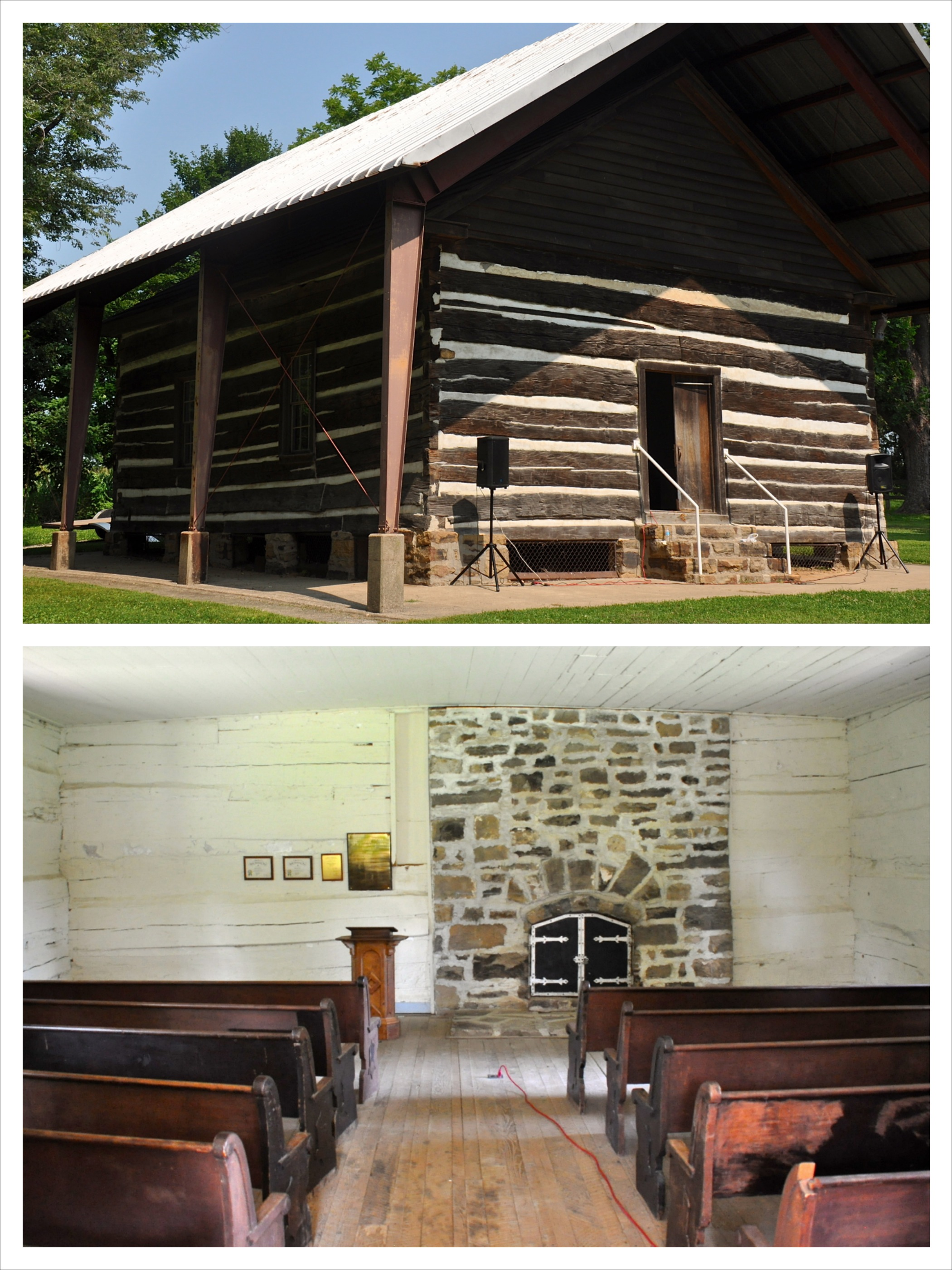
- McKendree Chapel exterior (top) & interior (bottom), July 2014.

- Location within Missouri Location within the United States
- Nearest city: Jackson, Missouri
- Coordinates: 37°22′41″N 89°37′7″W
- Area: 4.5 acres (1.8 ha)
- Built: 1819
- Architect: Glasscock, Charnal
- Architectural style: Log cabin style
- NRHP reference No.: 06000042 and 87000811
- Added to NRHP: April 13, 1987 (original); February 14, 2006 (increase)

McKendree Chapel, also known as Old McKendree Chapel, is a historic chapel located at Jackson, Missouri. It is a log cabin style chapel that was built in 1819 and is known as the oldest Protestant church standing west of the Mississippi River. The church was organized in July 1809. Adjacent to the church is the cemetery.

It was listed on the National Register of Historic Places in 1987, with a boundary increase in 2006.
