= Jackson Uptown Commercial Historic District =

Historic district in Missouri, United States

- U.S. National Register of Historic Places
- U.S. Historic district
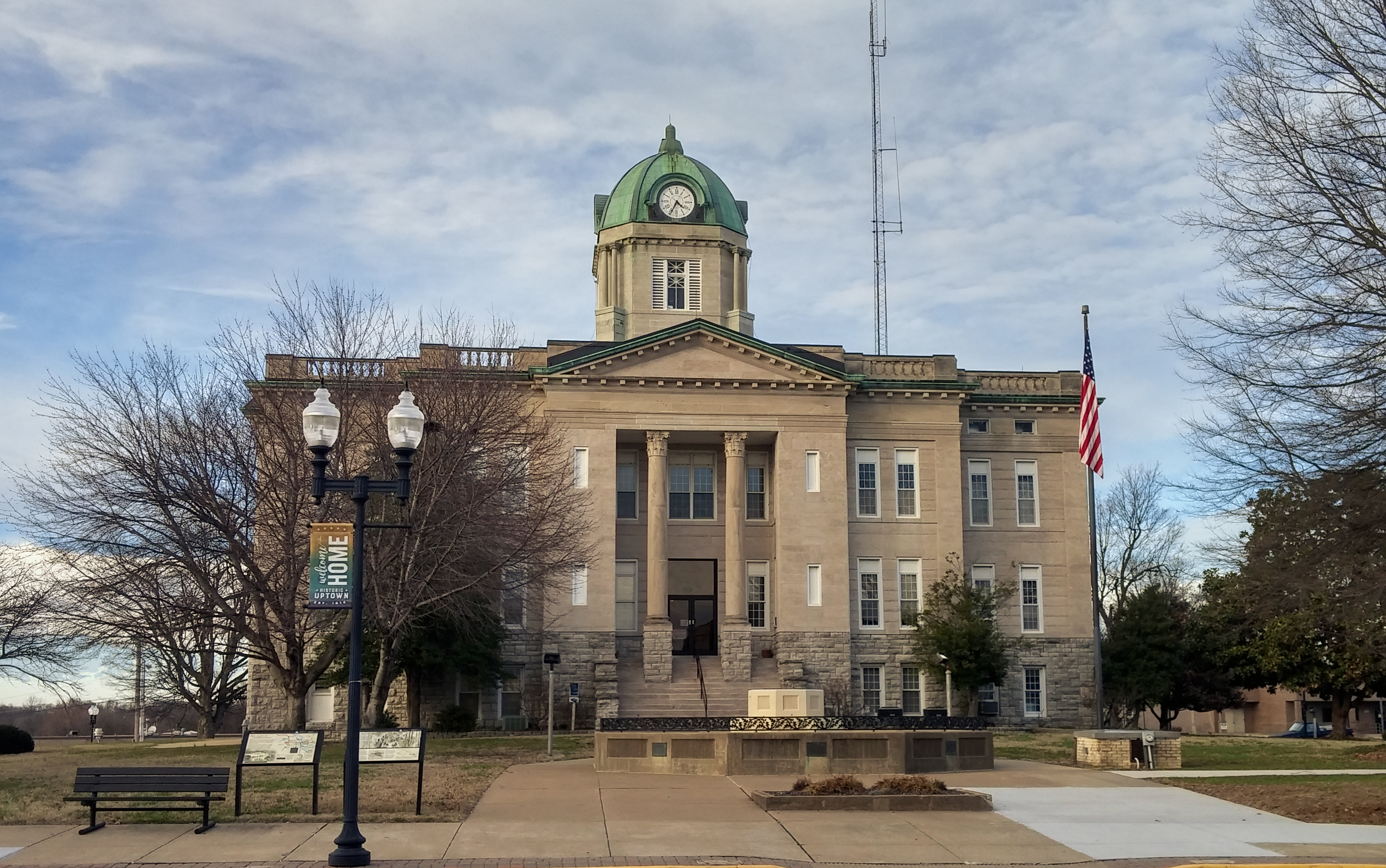
- Old Cape Girardeau County Courthouse, July 2011

- Location within Missouri Location within the United States
- Location: Roughly bounded by Court, Main, Missouri and High Sts., Jackson, Missouri
- Coordinates: 37°22′57″N 89°40′6″W
- Area: 3 acres (1.2 ha)
- Built: 1923
- Architect: P.H. Weathers
- Architectural style: Early Commercial, Classical Revival
- NRHP reference No.: 05001562
- Added to NRHP: February 1, 2006

Jackson Uptown Commercial Historic District is a national historic district located at Jackson, Cape Girardeau County, Missouri. The district encompasses 23 contributing buildings in the central business district of Jackson. It developed between about 1880 and 1953, and includes representative examples of Classical Revival style architecture. Notable buildings include the Cape Girardeau County Savings Bank (c. 1885, 1952), Kertsners's Drug Store (c. 1900), Cape Girardeau County Courthouse (c. 1906–1908) designed by P.H. Weathers, and Jones Drug Store (c. 1885, 1908).

It was listed on the National Register of Historic Places in 2005.
