= Oklahoma Frontier Drug Store Museum =

Science museum in Guthrie, Oklahoma, U.S.

- Location within Oklahoma Location within the United States
- Established: 1992
- Location: Guthrie, Logan County, Oklahoma
- Coordinates: 35.87823°N 97.42720°W
- Type: Science museum
- Collections: Antique Medicinal Treatments
- Founder: Ralph Enix
- Curator: Pam Ekiss
- Owner: Oklahoma Pharmacy Heritage Foundation
- Website: www.drugmuseum.org

Oklahoma Frontier Drug Store Museum was established in 1992 and located in Guthrie, Oklahoma. The museum has an occupancy in the Gaffney Building constructed in 1890 and integral to the Guthrie Historic District.

The museum has nineteenth century and early twentieth century apothecary artifacts related to alchemy, elixirs, esoteric pharmacies, herbal tonics, tinctures, and traditional medicines for confronting the struggles with the diseases and epidemics of the 19th century.

== The Apothecary Garden ==
The Oklahoma Frontier Drug Store Museum established the Apothecary Garden in the Spring of 2006. The physic garden offers specimens of botanical and medicinal plants used for herbal medicine and homeopathy as necessitated by the Oklahoma settlers and pioneers residing in the American frontier.

== Gallery ==
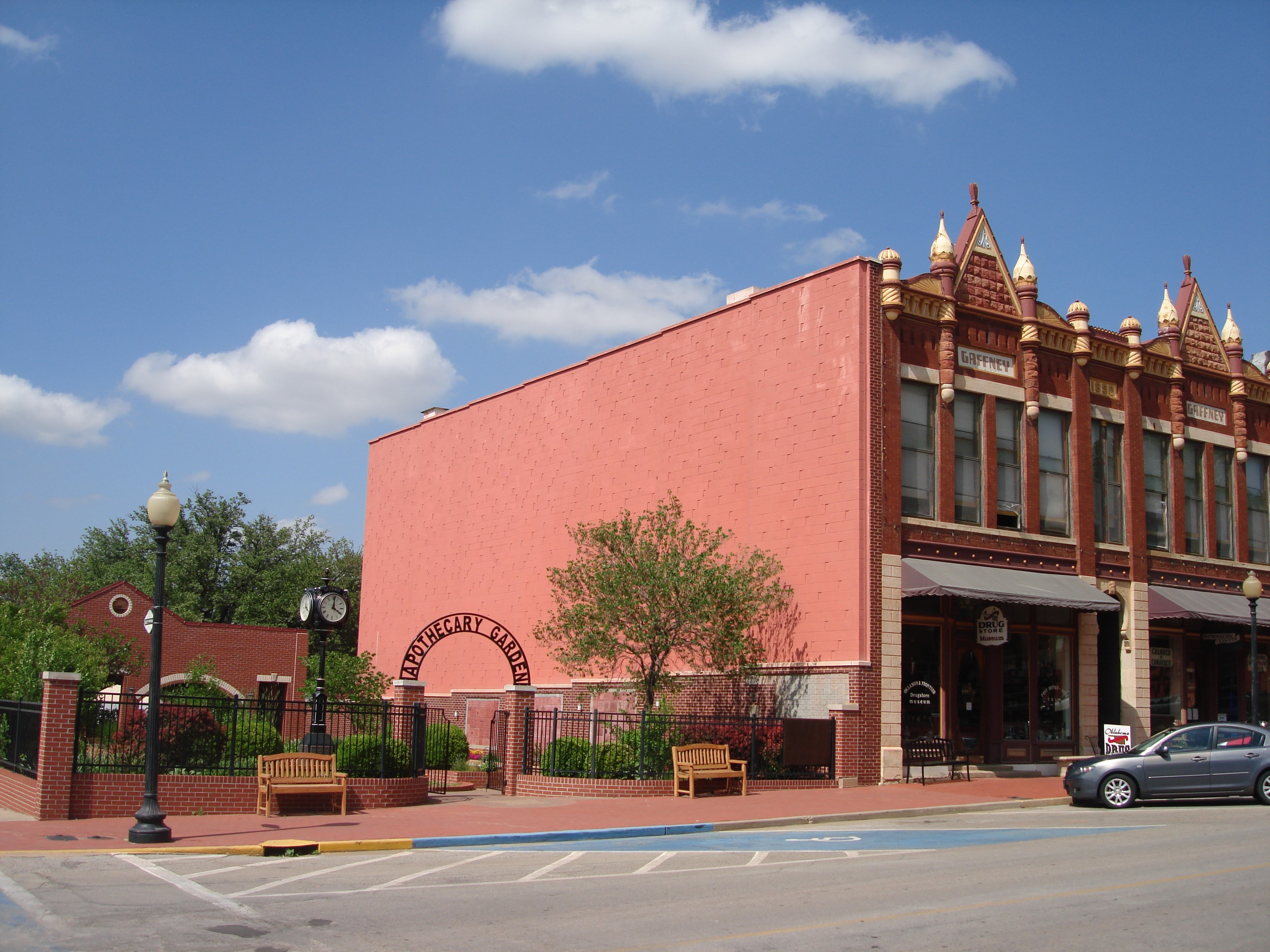
Apothecary Garden at Oklahoma Frontier Drug Store Museum

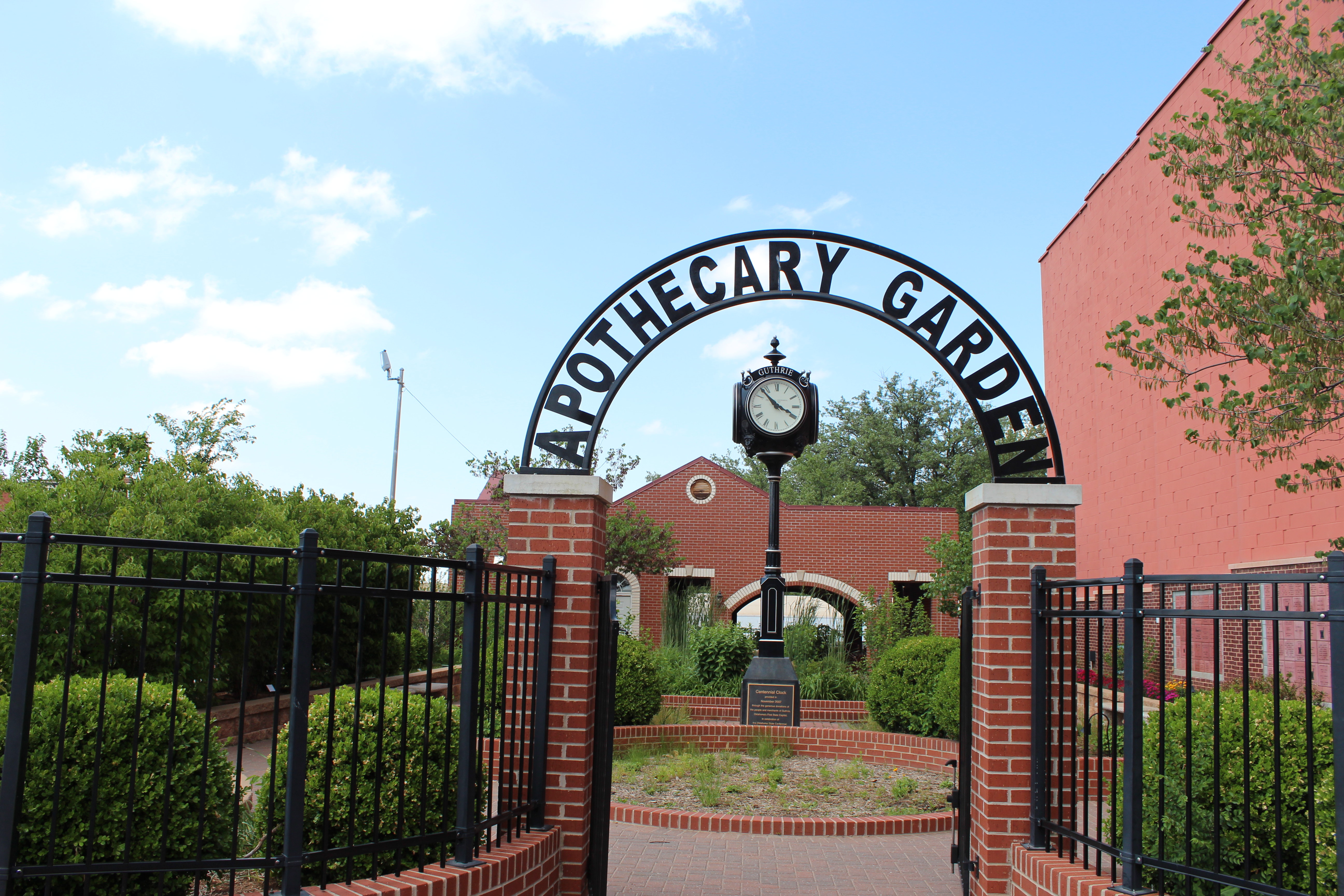
Apothecary Garden entrance at Oklahoma Frontier Drug Store Museum

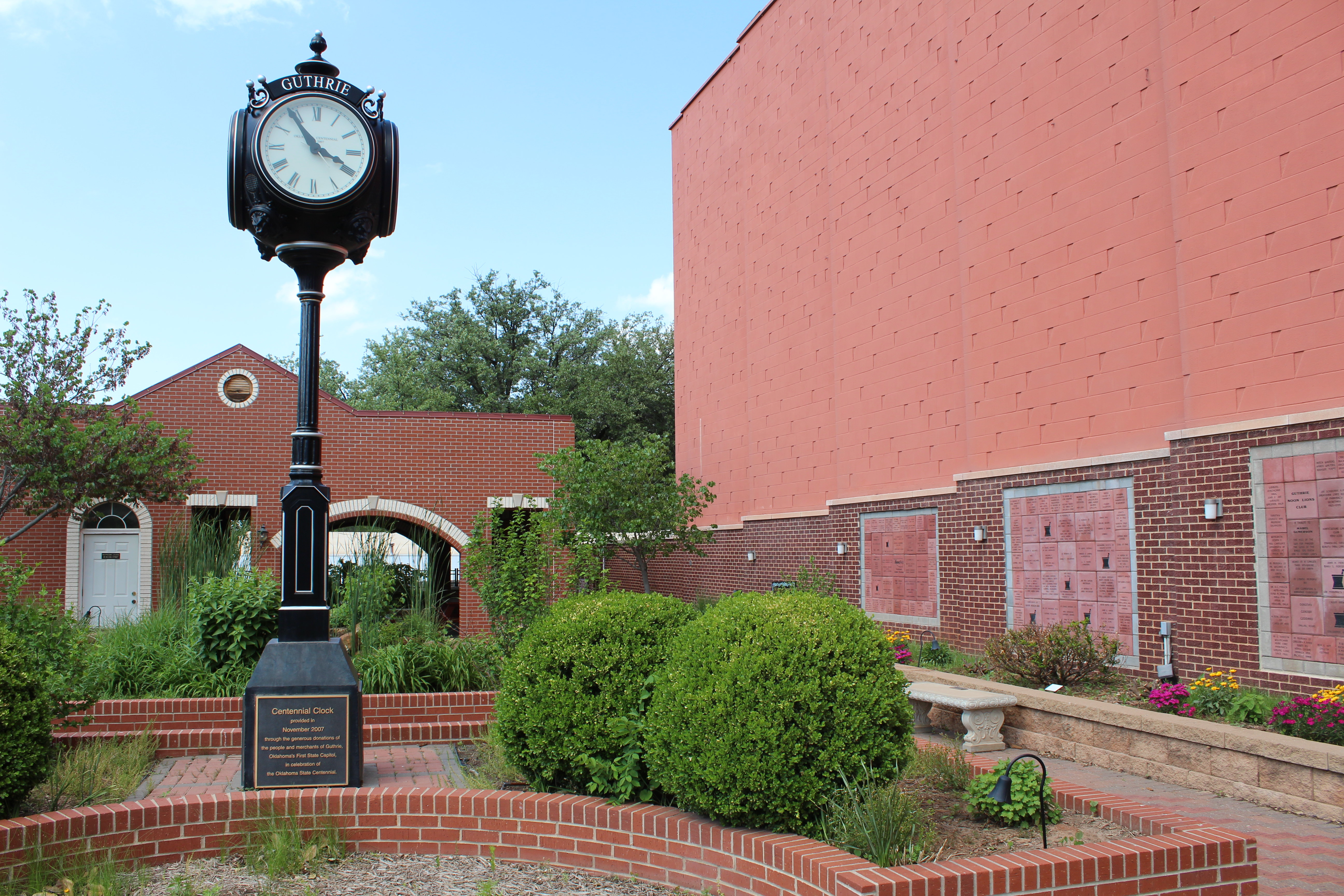
Centennial clock of the Apothecary Garden

== See also ==
- History of medicine
- History of pharmacy
- History of plant systematics
- Public health
