= Warden's House (McAlester, Oklahoma) =

Historic house in Oklahoma, United States

- U.S. National Register of Historic Places
- Location within Oklahoma Location within the United States
- Location: Penitentiary Blvd and West St., McAlester, Oklahoma
- Coordinates: 34°57′7.3″N 95°46′56.9″W
- Area: 1.9 acres (0.77 ha)
- Architect: Weathers, P.H.
- Architectural style: Mission/spanish Revival, Renaissance
- NRHP reference No.: 05000615
- Added to NRHP: June 17, 2005

The Warden's House at Penitentiary Blvd and West St. in McAlester, Oklahoma was listed on the National Register of Historic Places in 2005. It was designed by architect P.H. Weathers. It has also been known as Oklahoma State Penitentiary Warden's House. The NRHP listing included two contributing buildings on 1.9 acres (0.77 ha). It is located across the street from the Oklahoma State Penitentiary.
