= Old Washington County Courthouse (Oklahoma) =

- U.S. National Register of Historic Places
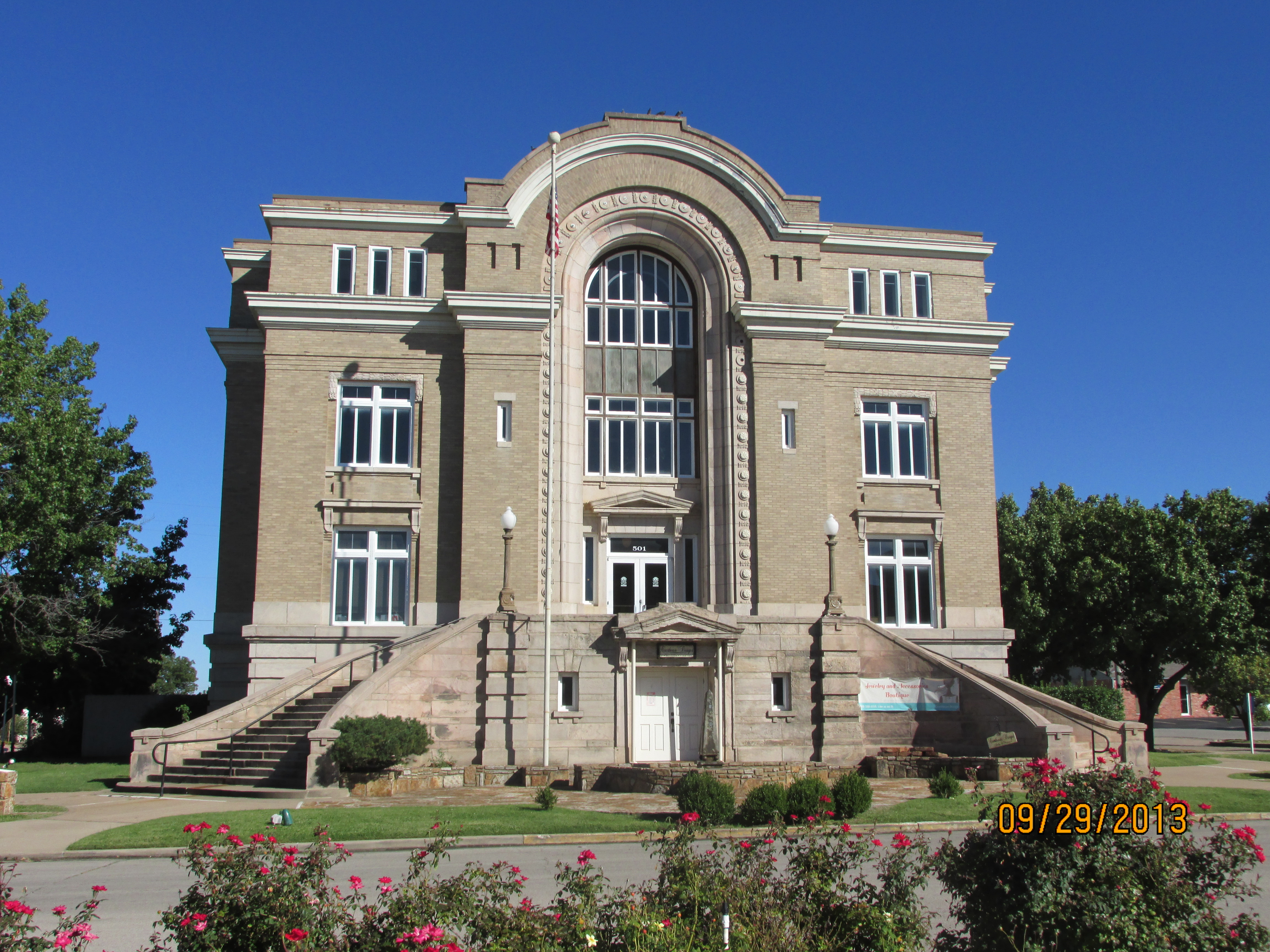

- Location within Oklahoma Location within the United States
- Interactive map showing the location of Old Washington County Courthouse
- Location: 501 SE Frank Phillips Blvd., Bartlesville, Oklahoma
- Coordinates: 36°45′1″N 95°58′17″W
- Area: less than one acre
- Built: 1913
- Architect: Weathers, P.H.
- Architectural style: Late 19th and 20th Century Revivals, Second Renaissance Revival
- NRHP reference No.: 81000469
- Added to NRHP: January 26, 1981

The Old Washington County Courthouse in Oklahoma is a reinforced concrete building that was built in 1913. It was designed by P.H. Weathers in Second Renaissance Revival style. It was listed on the National Register of Historic Places in 1981.

Washington County was founded in 1907, but it was not until 1912 that a bond issue to fund the courthouse was passed, on the third attempt.
