= Abraham Byrd House =

Historic house in Missouri, United States

- U.S. National Register of Historic Places
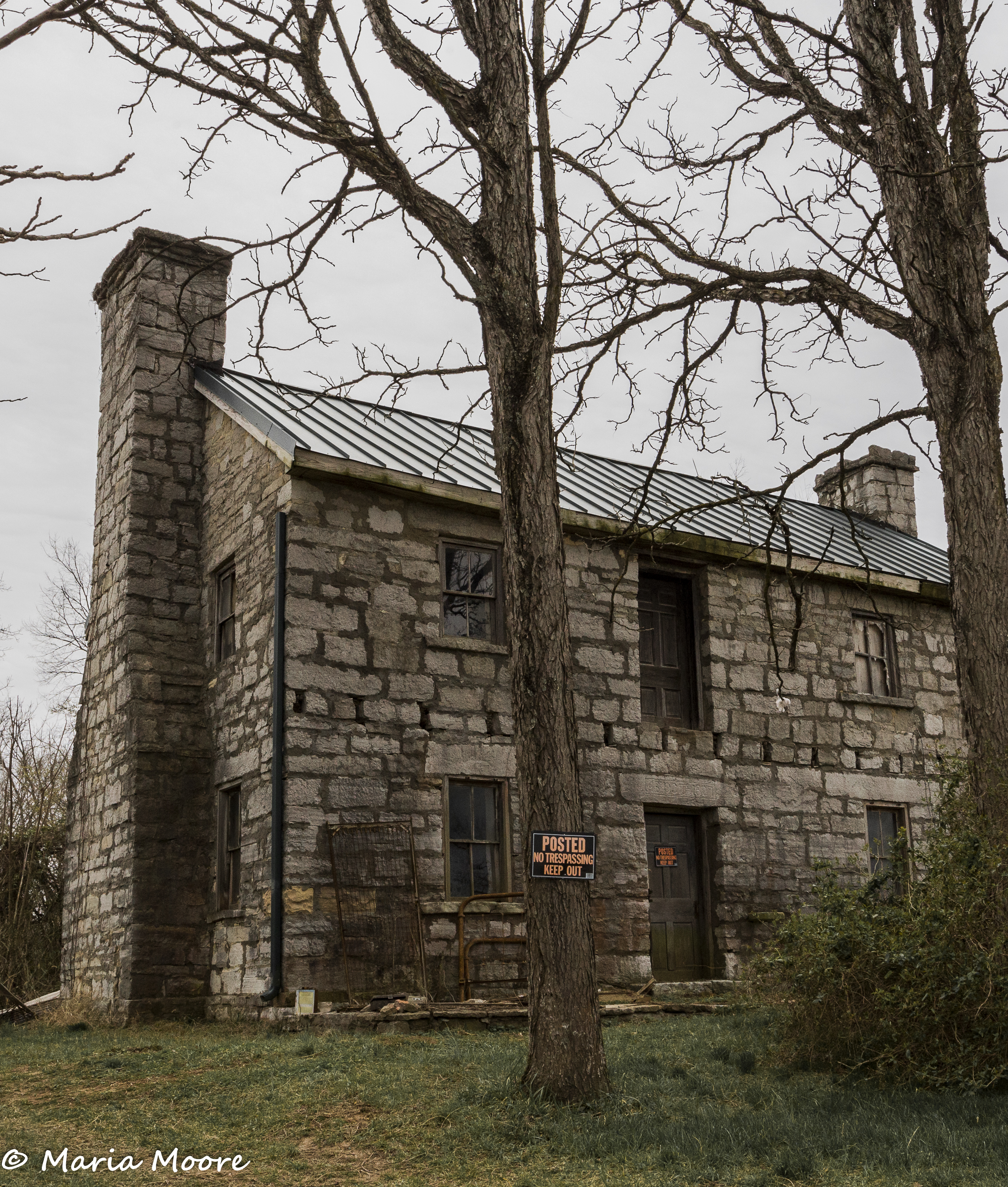

- Location within Missouri Location within the United States
- Location: 2832 County Road 442; Jackson, Missouri
- Coordinates: 37°27′5″N 89°41′58″W
- Area: less than one acre
- Built: 1827
- Architectural style: I-House
- NRHP reference No.: 07000572
- Added to NRHP: June 21, 2007

Abraham Byrd House is a historic home located at Jackson, Cape Girardeau County, Missouri. It was built in 1827, and is a two-story, vernacular I-house constructed with rough-cut limestone blocks. It has a one-story addition and a two-story service wing. It sits on a rough-cut limestone foundation. Located at the rear of the house is the foundation remains of the kitchen.

It was listed on the National Register of Historic Places in 2007.
