= Joseph Pierre Foucart =

American architect

Joseph Pierre Foucart (1848–1917) was a prominent architect during the opening of the Oklahoma Territory. The city of Guthrie, Oklahoma's skyline is dominated by buildings designed by him.

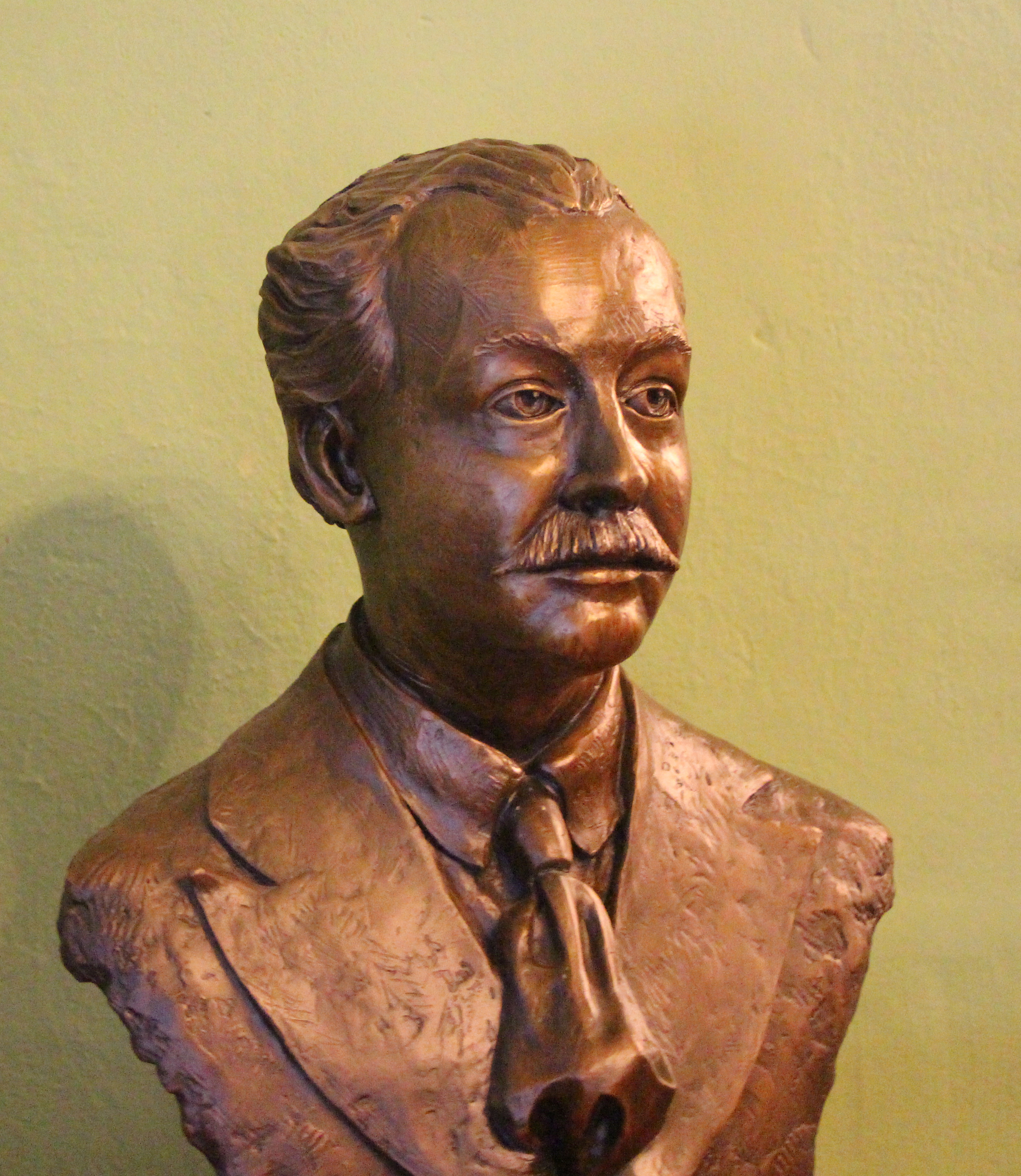
Joseph Foucart bust, Oklahoma Territorial Museum, Guthrie, Oklahoma

Foucart was the first architect to establish a practice in Oklahoma. He was the son of Katherine Mater and John Pierre Foucart, born on November 14, 1848, in Arlon, Belgium. He studied at the Royal Athenaeum in Arlon, Belgium, and studied civil engineering and architecture at Ghent, graduating in 1865. He worked as a civil engineer, and served in the French Army during the Franco-Prussian War. He oversaw the construction of the castle of Viere and assisted the architect for the King of Belgium. In 1880 he relocated to Paris and served as draftsman for the City Hall. His first wife was Frances Henrietta Jacques, who died in France. He later married Mary Philomene Jacquart née Coen in 1865. He immigrated to the United States in 1888 and settled within two months of the Land Rush of 1889. He left Guthrie in 1907 and moved to Muskogee, Oklahoma. He died there on April 11, 1917.

His building designs were influenced by the French architect Eugène Emmanuel Viollet-le-Duc. The buildings Foucart designed include the Bonfils Building, DeFord Building, Gaffney Building, Gray Brother's Building, State Capital Publishing Company Building, Victor Block and the Foucart Building. He also designed the First National Bank and Trust Company in Perry, Oklahoma, the "Castle on the plains" at the Northwestern State Normal School in Alva and the Williams Hall library at Oklahoma State University; the last two buildings are no longer extant. He also designed two brick private residences in Guthrie, Oklahoma.

Buildings Designed by Joseph Foucart
| Name | Address | Year Built | Architectural Style |
| Oklahoma Odd Fellows Home at Checotah Oklahoma Odd Fellows Home at Checotah | 211 West North St., Checotah, Oklahoma | 1902 | Romanesque Revival and Bungalow/Craftsman architecture |
| State Capital Publishing Company Building State Capital Publishing Company Building | 301 West Harrison Avenue, Guthrie, Oklahoma | 1902 | Commercial Style |
| Victor Block Victor Block | 202-206 W. Harrison Avenue, Guthrie, Oklahoma | 1893 | Richardsonian Romanesque |
| Foucart Building Foucart Building | 115 W. Harrison Avenue, Guthrie, Oklahoma | 1891 | Romanesque Revival with Gothic Revival influences |
| Gray Brothers Building Gray Brothers Building | 101-103 W. Oklahoma Avenue, Guthrie, Oklahoma | 1890 & 1893 | Richardsonian Romanesque |
| Bonfils Building Bonfils Building | 107 S. Second Street, Guthrie, Oklahoma | 1890 | Richardsonian Romanesque |
| De Ford Building De Ford Building | 116 S. Second Street, Guthrie, Oklahoma | 1890 | Richardsonian Romanesque |
| Gaffney Building Gaffney Building, Guthrie, Oklahoma | 212-214 W. Oklahoma Avenue, Guthrie, Oklahoma | 1890 | Architectural style not classified |
| First National Bank First National Bank | Perry, Oklahoma | 1902 | Italian Mannerist style |
| Castle on the Hill Castle on the Hill | Alva, Oklahoma | 1899 | Romanesque Revival of Norman architecture. Northwestern Normal School building, burned in 1935 and demolished. |
| Williams Hall Library Williams Hall Library | Oklahoma State University, Stillwater, Oklahoma | | |
| Joseph Foucart Designed Private Residence Foucart Residence, Guthrie, Oklahoma | Intersection of Ash and Cleveland Streets, Guthrie, Oklahoma | | |
| Joseph Foucart Designed Private Residence Foucart Designed Private Residence | Intersection of Maple Street and Warner Avenue, Guthrie, Oklahoma | | |
