= Big Hill Farmstead Historic District =

Historic district in Missouri, United States

- U.S. National Register of Historic Places
- U.S. Historic district
- Location within Missouri Location within the United States
- Location: 2246 Route PP, Jackson, Missouri
- Coordinates: 37°21′49″N 89°41′26″W
- Area: 129.7 acres (52.5 ha)
- Built: 1855
- Architectural style: Greek Revival, I-house
- NRHP reference No.: 99001598
- Added to NRHP: December 22, 1999

Big Hill Farmstead Historic District is a historic home and farm and national historic district located at Jackson, Cape Girardeau County, Missouri. The farmhouse was built about 1855, and is a two-story, five-bay, brick I-house with Greek Revival and Italianate style design elements. It has a hipped roof and features a gallery porch. Other contributing elements are the a timber frame barn (c. 1855), a cabin/workshop (c. 1856), a wagon shed (c. 1870s), and the surrounding farmland.

It was listed on the National Register of Historic Places in 1999.
