= Big Hill (Idaho) =

Big Hill is a hill just East of Montpelier in Idaho. It was known to be one of the steepest descents along the Oregon Trail. One can still see wagon ruts going up and over the hill from the roadside turnout.

It is sign #338 at Milepost 441.7 along the Idaho Highway Historical Marker Route. A collection of over 244 signs created as part of the Idaho Centennial celebration. It is also part of the Human Migration Monument project.

== See also ==
- Geography of Idaho
