= Logan County Courthouse (Oklahoma) =

- U.S. National Register of Historic Places
- U.S. Historic district – Contributing property
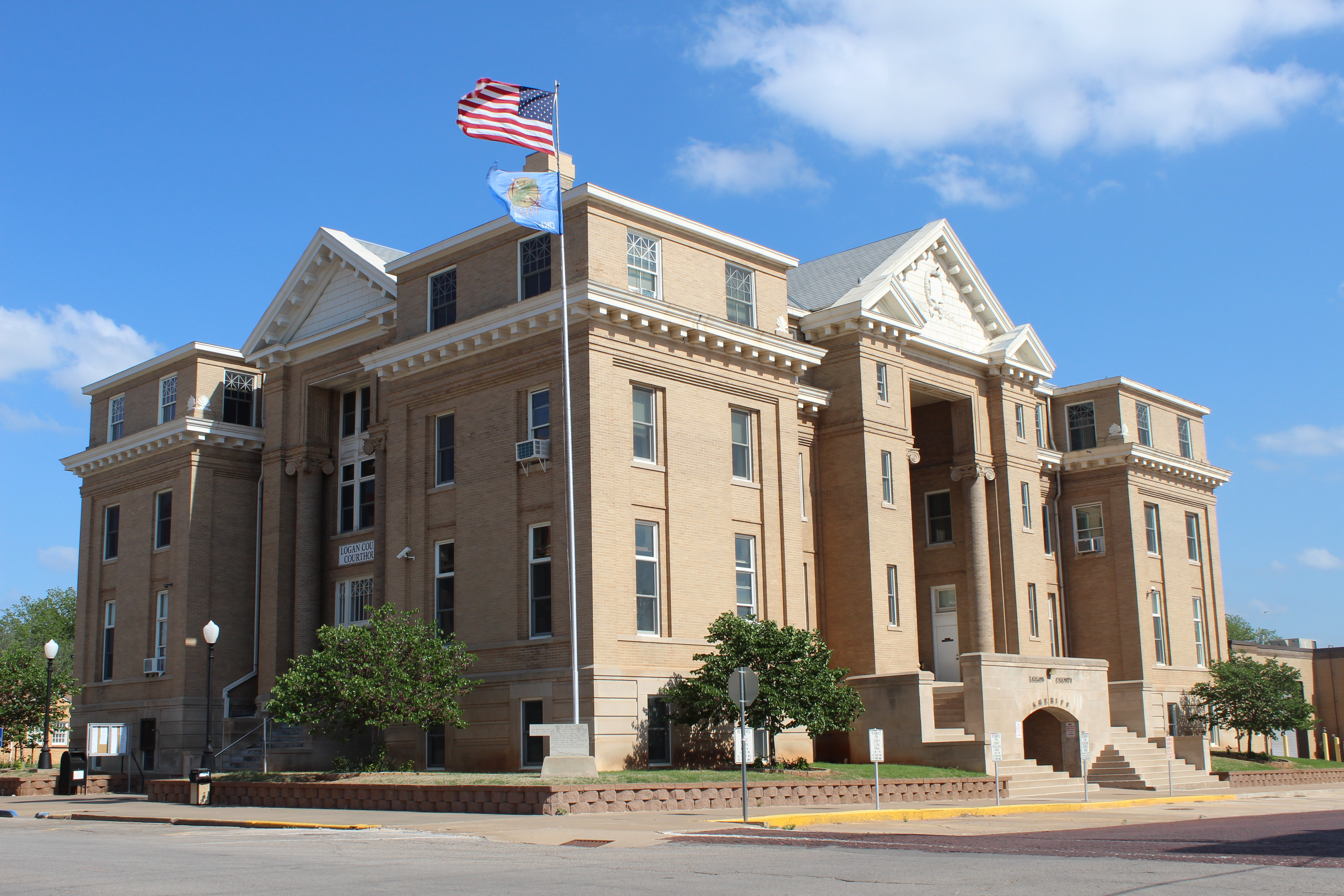

- Location within Oklahoma Location within the United States
- Interactive map showing the location of Logan County Courthouse
- Location: 301 E. Harrison St., Guthrie, Oklahoma
- Coordinates: 35°52′36″N 97°25′19″W
- Area: 1 acre (0.40 ha)
- Built: 1907
- Built by: Manhattan Construction Co.
- Architect: P. H. Weathers
- Architectural style: Classical Revival
- Part of: Guthrie Historic District
- MPS: County Courthouses of Oklahoma TR
- NRHP reference No.: 84003141
- Added to NRHP: October 26, 1984

The Logan County Courthouse in Guthrie, Oklahoma, at 301 E. Harrison Street, was built in 1907. It was listed on the National Register of Historic Places in 1984.

Designed by architect P. H. Weathers, it is a four-story buff brick building with "simplified Beaux Arts" as well as Classical Revival styling.

It is also a contributing building in the National Register-listed Guthrie Historic District.
