= Big Hill (Missouri) =

Summit in the US state of Missouri

Coordinates: 37°39′23″N 90°16′24″W

Big Hill is a summit in St. Francois County in the U.S. state of Missouri. The peak has elevation of 1,194 feet (364 m).

Big Hill was named for the fact it is larger than other nearby hills. A variant name was "Pole Hill".
