= Big Hill (Alberta) =

Coordinates: 51.2013889°N 114.3619444°W

Big Hill is a summit in Alberta, Canada.

Big Hill was so named on account of its size.
