= Carnegie Library (Guthrie, Oklahoma) =

- U.S. National Register of Historic Places
- U.S. Historic district – Contributing property
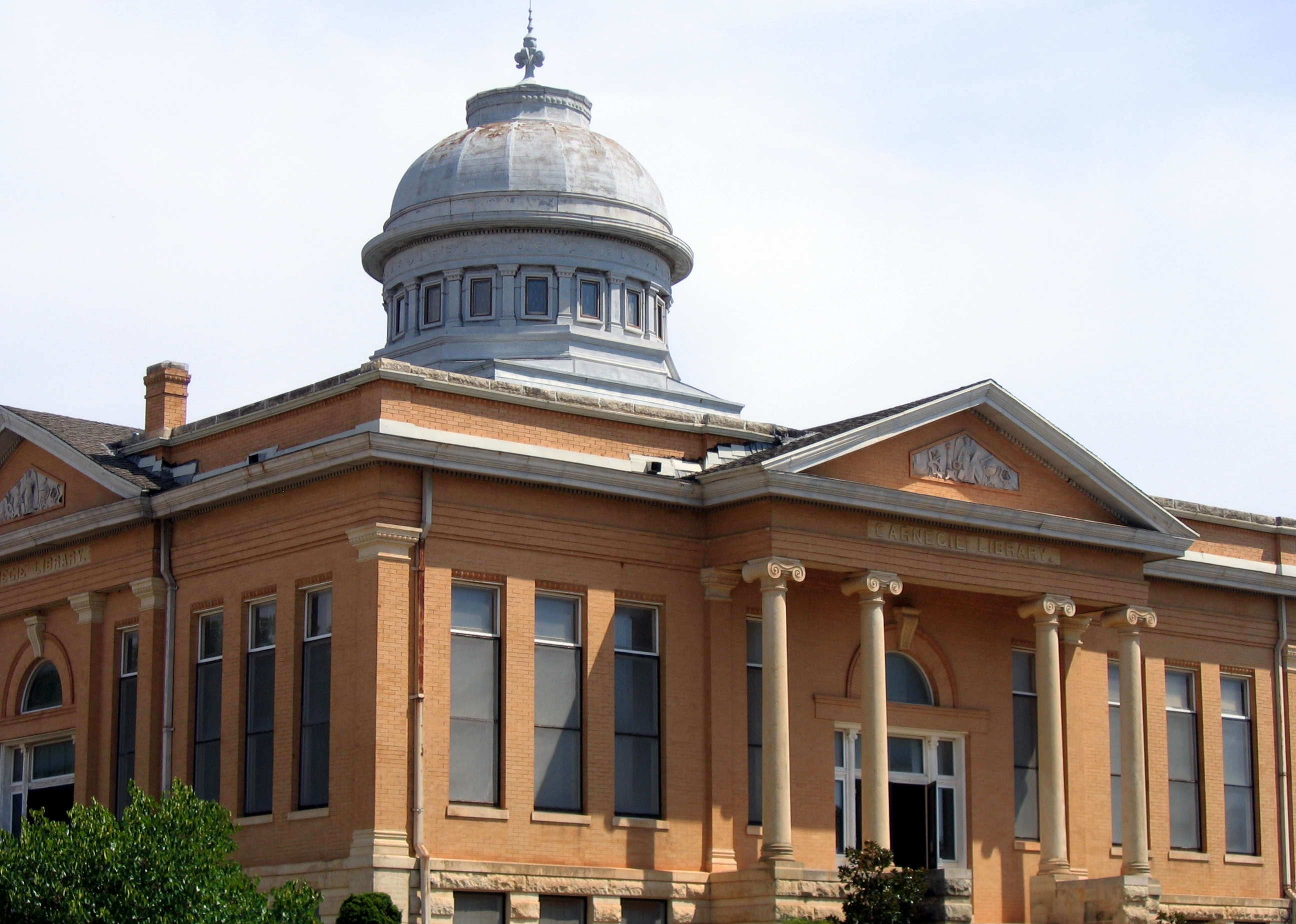
- The Carnegie Library in 2006

- Location within Oklahoma Location within the United States
- Location: 402 East Oklahoma Avenue (corner of Oklahoma Ave. and Ash St)., Guthrie, Oklahoma
- Coordinates: 35°52′48″N 97°25′5″W
- Area: 0.5 acres (0.20 ha)
- Built: 1901
- NRHP reference No.: 71000666
- Added to NRHP: June 21, 1971

The Carnegie Library in Guthrie, Oklahoma, is a building at 406 East Oklahoma Avenue. Constructed in 1901, It was the second Carnegie-funded library built in Oklahoma and the oldest one still in existence. (Note: Oklahoma City built the first Carnegie library in Oklahoma in 1899. That building was razed in 1951) The Guthrie library opened on May 20, 1903, It remained Guthrie's main library until 1972, when the city decided to tear it down and build a new facility in its place. Fred Pfeiffer, a local philanthropist, offered to fund a new structure next door to the Carnegie Library, if the old building were kept intact. The city accepted his offer, and gave the building to the Oklahoma Historical Society. It was listed on the National Register of Historic Places in 1971. The old building is now part of the Oklahoma Territorial Museum. Oklahoma Territorial Museum opened Nov. 13, 1973.

== History ==
The Federated Women's Clubs of Guthrie established a library board and requested a grant from Andrew Carnegie to construct a building. In 1901, Carnegie initially granted $20,000, then added another $5,000. The library board hired H. J. Vandenberg as the construction contractor. The women's club apparently raised additional money for the project, because the total cost of the project was approximately $35,000. They probably collected books and furnished up the meeting room, since that was the usual arrangement for Carnegie libraries.

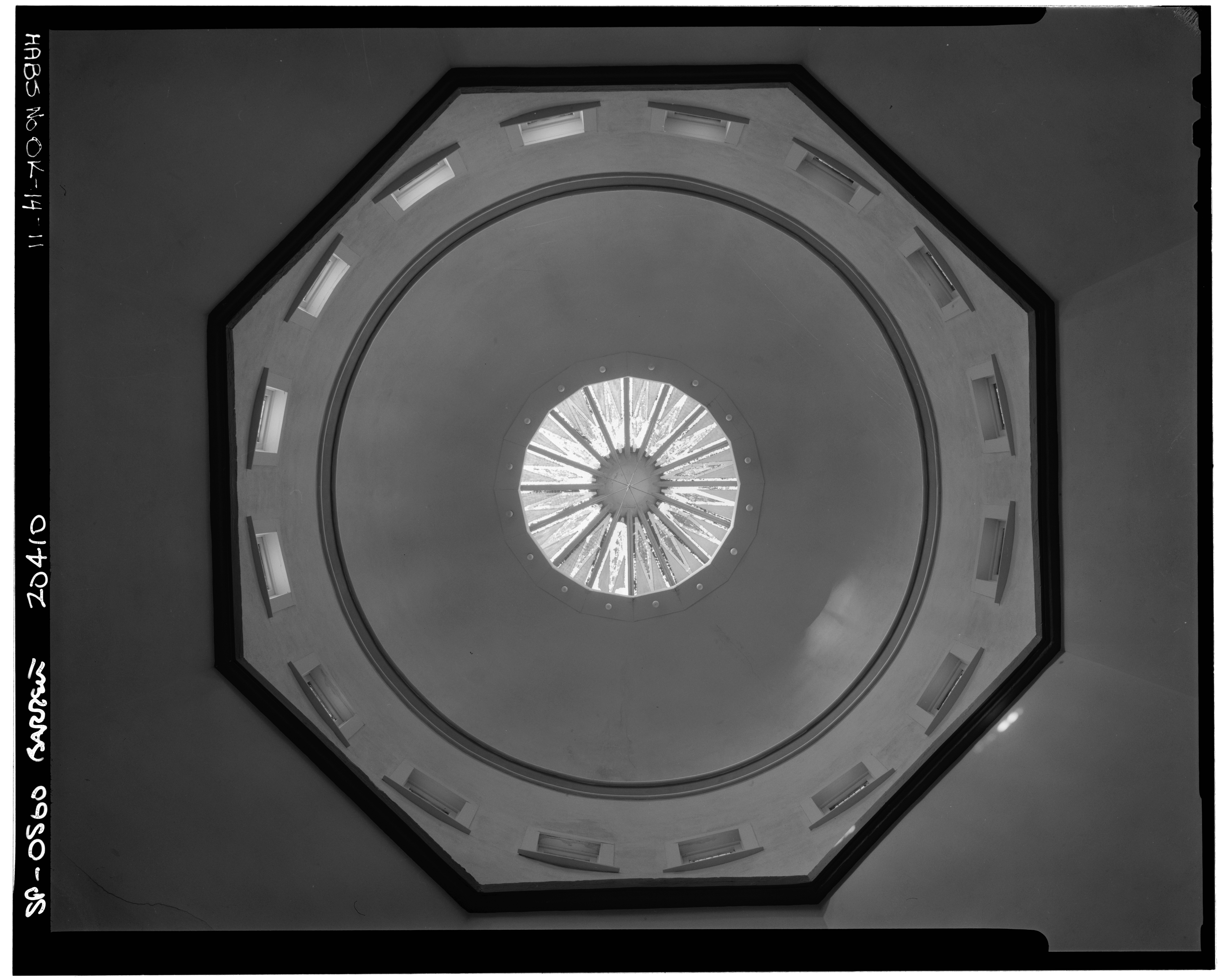
Interior of dome that drew the displeasure of Andrew Carnegie.

Initially, there were no criteria for architectural style of the Carnegie library buildings, although Carnegie voiced his expectation that the edifice should, "... signify its importance to the community." The building was designed by J. H. Bennett, a local architect. Its architectural style has been described as "Second Renaissance Revival." It is a two-story building, constructed of brick and stone with a full attic. The building was 60 feet (18 m) by 20 feet (6.1 m). The ground floor featured a room in the center covered by a rotunda. The dome is 20 feet (6.1 m) in diameter and rises 50 feet (15 m). The rotunda was surrounded by five rooms for reading, book storage and club meetings.

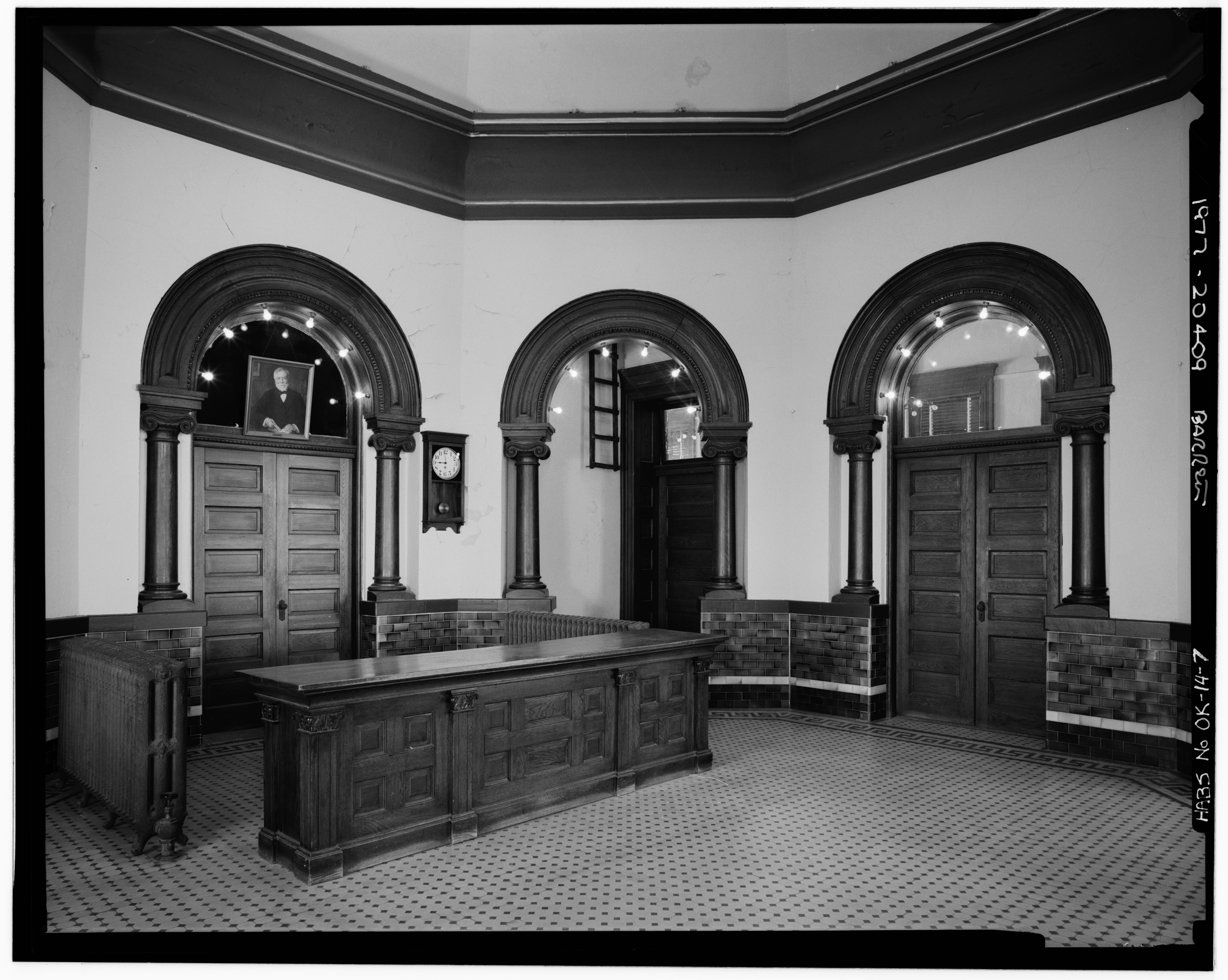
Main Desk of Carnegie Library.

Carnegie was displeased when he learned that grant funds had been spent for a rotunda, a meeting room and fireplaces in the reading rooms. He wanted the money to be used for buying books and installing shelves to hold them. The Guthrie library was the last Carnegie library in Oklahoma to use his grant money for such an expenditure,

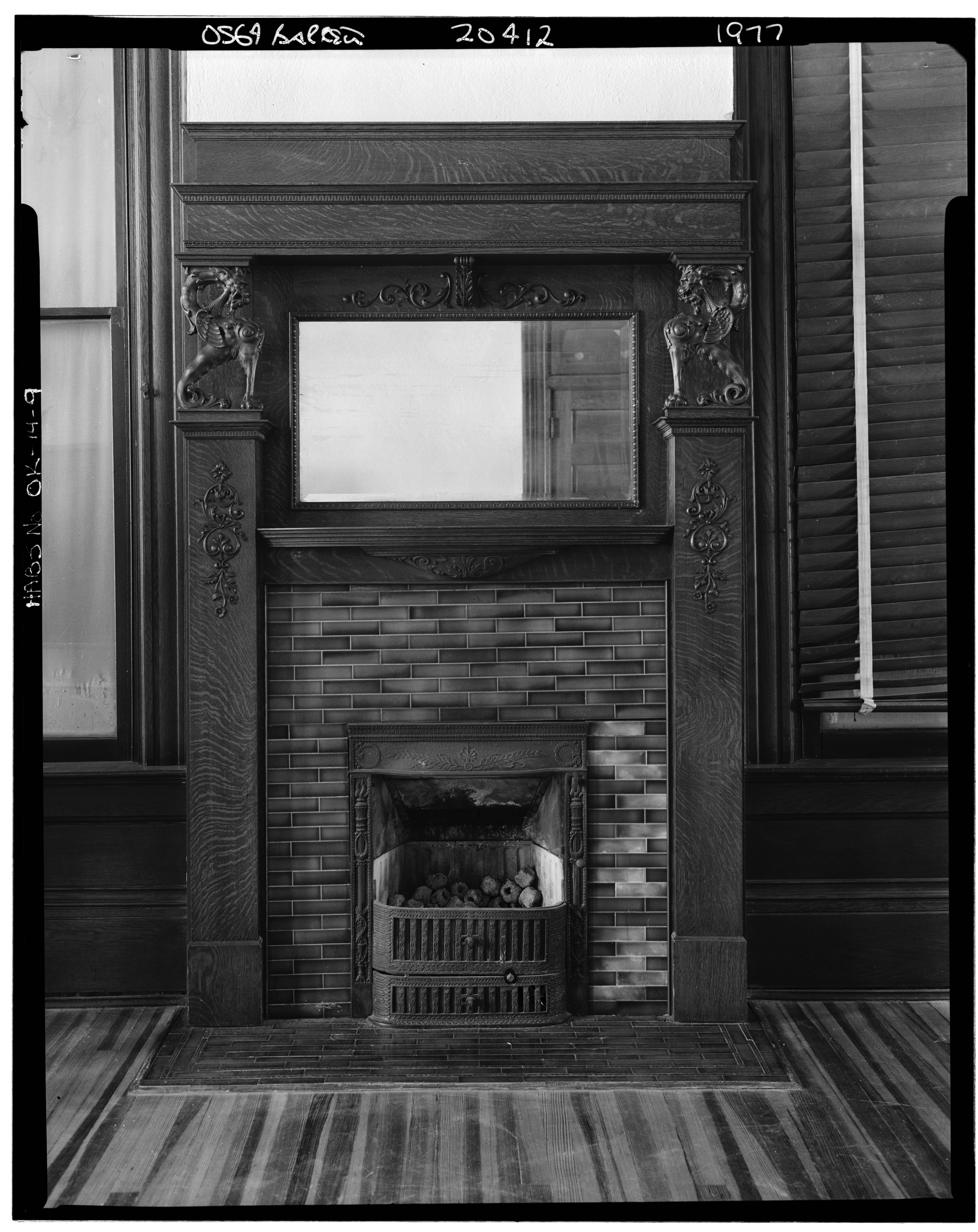
Andrew Carnegie forbade using his library grants for amenities like this fireplace in the Guthrie library.

Significant historical events at the building included the 1906 inauguration of the last territorial governor, Frank Frantz and the November 16, 1907 inauguration of the first state governor, Charles N. Haskell. It is a supporting building for the Guthrie Historic District. A statue on the grounds of the library/museum complex commemorates the symbolic wedding of Mr. Oklahoma and Miss Indian Territory during Governor Haskell's inaugural.

== Oklahoma Territorial Museum ==
The Oklahoma Territorial Museum contains documents and exhibits about the creation of the Unassigned Lands in Indian Territory, the Land Run of 1889, homesteading and the governments of both Oklahoma Territory and the State of Oklahoma (1907 - 1910).

The museum building has two stories and is adjacent to the Carnegie Library building, which operates as part of the museum. The physical address is 406 East Oklahoma Avenue in Guthrie. The first floor of the new building presents exhibits about the Land Run and the lifestyle of settlers in the Oklahoma Territory. The second floor is "territorial government, transportation, education, entertainment, and the statehood experience."

== See also ==
- "Carnegie Libraries." Encyclopedia of Oklahoma History and Culture. Everett, Dianna. Retrieved August 10, 2014.
- Carnegie library
