= Jackson, Missouri =

- City
- Downtown Jackson Old Cape Girardeau County Courthouse Old Post Office Building

- Location of Jackson in Cape Girardeau County, Missouri.

- Location within Missouri Location within the United States
- Coordinates: 37°22′48″N 89°39′29″W
- Country: United States
- State: Missouri
- County: Cape Girardeau
- Named for: Andrew Jackson

Area
  - Total: 10.76 sq mi (27.87 km^{2})
  - Land: 10.75 sq mi (27.83 km^{2})
  - Water: 0.015 sq mi (0.04 km^{2})
- Elevation: 466 ft (142 m)

Population (2020)
  - Total: 15,481
  - Density: 1,440.7/sq mi (556.24/km^{2})
  - Demonym: Jacksonian
- Time zone: UTC-6 (Central (CST))
  - Summer (DST): UTC-5 (CDT)
- ZIP Code: 63755
- Area code: 573
- FIPS code: 29-35648
- GNIS feature ID: 0720202
- Website: City website

Jackson is a city in and the county seat of Cape Girardeau County, Missouri, United States. It is a principal city of the Cape Girardeau-Jackson metropolitan area Area. The population of Jackson was 15,481 at the 2020 census.

== History ==
In 1813, Cape Girardeau County succeeded Cape Girardeau District, and the Court of Common Pleas and the Court of General Quarter-Sessions of the Peace in Cape Girardeau were superseded by the Court of Common Pleas, leading to a new seat of justice. The seat of the county and the courts were at first held on the plantation of Thomas Bull about one and one-half mile south of present-day Jackson. Land was then purchased along Hubble Creek for the county seat in 1814.

The first post office was established in 1814 when the area was called Birdstown. The name was changed to Jackson on August 31, 1819, named for Andrew Jackson, a general popular for his role in the War of 1812. It was the first town to be named after Andrew Jackson. The town was platted in 1815. The Missouri Herald, the third newspaper in state, was established here on June 25, 1819. In 1818, the town already had a population of 300. The first county courthouse was built in 1818 on Jackson's public square.

Although its initial growth was rapid, the economy of the City of Jackson developed conservatively. The town suffered a setback in June, 1833, when Cholera spread killing 128. Cholera struck again on June 10, 1852, causing all abled bodies to flee the town until the epidemic had run its course. In 1841, a bank was established. A flour mill was constructed in 1855 and another in 1873. But the community could not escape the impact of the American Civil War; on June 24, 1861, a military skirmish took place near Jackson between units of the Union Army and the Confederate Army.

In 1877, Jackson was linked to Cape Girardeau by the first long-distance railway service line in Missouri. By 1884, the population of the City of Jackson had grown to 2,105, and the town supported 50 businesses. In 1884, by popular vote, it was decided to incorporate Jackson as a city of the fourth class. The courthouse built in 1818 burned down in 1870. The current courthouse was built in 1908 and is “on the square” in the center of Uptown Jackson where Jones Drug Store still runs and serves the community since 1871.

The Big Hill Farmstead Historic District, Abraham Byrd House, Frizel-Welling House, Jackson Uptown Commercial Historic District, and McKendree Chapel are listed on the National Register of Historic Places.

== Geography ==
Jackson is located on US Route 61 approximately seven miles northwest of Cape Girardeau. Hubble Creek and its tributary Goose Creek flow through the city.

According to the United States Census Bureau, the city has a total area of 10.96 square miles (28.39 km^{2}), of which 10.94 square miles (28.33 km^{2}) is land and 0.02 square miles (0.05 km^{2}) is water.

=== Climate ===
Climate data for Jackson, Missouri (1991–2020 normals, extremes 1901–present)
Month	Jan	Feb	Mar	Apr	May	Jun	Jul	Aug	Sep	Oct	Nov	Dec	Year
Record high °F (°C)	77 (25)	82 (28)	88 (31)	94 (34)	99 (37)	108 (42)	112 (44)	111 (44)	110 (43)	96 (36)	87 (31)	75 (24)	112 (44)
Mean daily maximum °F (°C)	41.2 (5.1)	46.2 (7.9)	56.7 (13.7)	68.6 (20.3)	78.2 (25.7)	87.0 (30.6)	90.2 (32.3)	88.9 (31.6)	81.8 (27.7)	70.1 (21.2)	55.2 (12.9)	44.6 (7.0)	67.4 (19.7)
Daily mean °F (°C)	32.4 (0.2)	36.4 (2.4)	46.0 (7.8)	57.2 (14.0)	67.3 (19.6)	76.1 (24.5)	79.6 (26.4)	78.0 (25.6)	70.2 (21.2)	58.3 (14.6)	45.3 (7.4)	36.2 (2.3)	56.9 (13.8)
Mean daily minimum °F (°C)	23.7 (−4.6)	26.6 (−3.0)	35.3 (1.8)	45.7 (7.6)	56.4 (13.6)	65.3 (18.5)	68.9 (20.5)	67.1 (19.5)	58.7 (14.8)	46.5 (8.1)	35.4 (1.9)	27.9 (−2.3)	46.5 (8.1)
Record low °F (°C)	−26 (−32)	−24 (−31)	−2 (−19)	21 (−6)	29 (−2)	39 (4)	44 (7)	40 (4)	29 (−2)	17 (−8)	−6 (−21)	−24 (−31)	−26 (−32)
Average precipitation inches (mm)	3.34 (85)	3.68 (93)	5.01 (127)	5.51 (140)	5.53 (140)	4.20 (107)	4.29 (109)	3.61 (92)	3.40 (86)	3.65 (93)	4.57 (116)	3.70 (94)	50.49 (1,282)
Average snowfall inches (cm)	2.2 (5.6)	1.2 (3.0)	1.5 (3.8)	0.0 (0.0)	0.0 (0.0)	0.0 (0.0)	0.0 (0.0)	0.0 (0.0)	0.0 (0.0)	0.1 (0.25)	0.1 (0.25)	2.4 (6.1)	7.5 (19)
Average precipitation days (≥ 0.01 in)	9.8	8.4	11.4	10.7	11.5	9.2	8.8	7.7	6.8	7.6	9.2	9.4	110.5
Average snowy days (≥ 0.1 in)	1.1	0.9	0.3	0.0	0.0	0.0	0.0	0.0	0.0	0.0	0.1	0.6	3.0
Source: NOAA

== Demographics ==
Historical population
Census	Pop.	Note	%±
1860	433		—
1870	459		6.0%
1880	795		73.2%
1890	941		18.4%
1900	1,658		76.2%
1910	2,105		27.0%
1920	2,114		0.4%
1930	2,465		16.6%
1940	3,113		26.3%
1950	3,707		19.1%
1960	4,875		31.5%
1970	5,896		20.9%
1980	7,827		32.8%
1990	9,256		18.3%
2000	11,947		29.1%
2010	13,758		15.2%
2020	15,481		12.5%
U.S. Decennial Census 2020

=== 2020 census ===
As of the 2020 census, Jackson had a population of 15,481. The median age was 37.8 years. 23.9% of residents were under the age of 18 and 18.4% of residents were 65 years of age or older. For every 100 females there were 95.1 males, and for every 100 females age 18 and over there were 90.6 males age 18 and over.

98.7% of residents lived in urban areas, while 1.3% lived in rural areas.

There were 6,081 households in Jackson, of which 33.8% had children under the age of 18 living in them. Of all households, 50.7% were married-couple households, 14.7% were households with a male householder and no spouse or partner present, and 27.9% were households with a female householder and no spouse or partner present. About 26.7% of all households were made up of individuals and 12.5% had someone living alone who was 65 years of age or older.

There were 6,507 housing units, of which 6.5% were vacant. The homeowner vacancy rate was 1.6% and the rental vacancy rate was 8.5%.

Racial composition as of the 2020 census
Race	Number	Percent
White	13,903	89.8%
Black or African American	401	2.6%
American Indian and Alaska Native	32	0.2%
Asian	154	1.0%
Native Hawaiian and Other Pacific Islander	1	0.0%
Some other race	127	0.8%
Two or more races	863	5.6%
Hispanic or Latino (of any race)	298	1.9%

=== Income and poverty ===
The 2016–2020 5-year American Community Survey estimates show that the median household income was $63,152 (with a margin of error of +/- $9,713) and the median family income was $74,970 (+/- $2,492). Males had a median income of $43,687 (+/- $1,796) versus $25,955 (+/- $3,289) for females. The median income for those above 16 years old was $34,452 (+/- $2,905). Approximately, 7.2% of families and 9.7% of the population were below the poverty line, including 10.8% of those under the age of 18 and 6.0% of those ages 65 or over.

=== 2010 census ===
At the 2010 census there were 13,758 people, 5,496 households, and 3,827 families living in the city. The population density was 1,257.6 inhabitants per square mile (485.6/km^{2}). There were 5,835 housing units at an average density of 533.4 per square mile (205.9/km^{2}). The racial makeup of the city was 95.81% White, 1.65% Black or African American, 0.27% Native American, 0.57% Asian, 0.01% Native Hawaiian or Pacific Islander, 0.32% from other races, and 1.37% from two or more races. Hispanic or Latino of any race were 1.24%.

Of the 5,496 households 36.0% had children under the age of 18 living with them, 53.3% were married couples living together, 11.9% had a female householder with no husband present, 4.4% had a male householder with no wife present, and 30.4% were non-families. 26.4% of households were one person and 11.3% were one person aged 65 or older. The average household size was 2.46 and the average family size was 2.96.

The median age was 37.3 years. 25.6% of residents were under the age of 18; 8.3% were between the ages of 18 and 24; 26.1% were from 25 to 44; 24.8% were from 45 to 64; and 15.2% were 65 or older. The gender makeup of the city was 47.0% male and 53.0% female.

=== 2000 census ===
At the 2000 census there were 11,947 people, 4,708 households, and 3,385 families living in the city. The population density was 1,180.2 inhabitants per square mile (455.7/km^{2}). There were 4,962 housing units at an average density of 490.2 per square mile (189.3/km^{2}). The racial makeup of the city was 96.57% White, 1.36% African American, 0.28% Native American, 0.56% Asian, 0.03% Pacific Islander, 0.19% from other races, and 1.01% from two or more races. Hispanic or Latino of any race were 0.76%.

Of the 4,708 households 36.9% had children under the age of 18 living with them, 59.2% were married couples living together, 9.9% had a female householder with no husband present, and 28.1% were non-families. 25.1% of households were one person and 11.9% were one person aged 65 or older. The average household size was 2.50 and the average family size was 2.98.

The age distribution was 26.6% under the age of 18, 8.2% from 18 to 24, 29.9% from 25 to 44, 21.3% from 45 to 64, and 14.0% 65 or older. The median age was 36 years. For every 100 females, there were 89.8 males. For every 100 females age 18 and over, there were 85.8 males.

The median household income was $40,412 and the median family income was $46,854. Males had a median income of $35,212 versus $19,994 for females. The per capita income for the city was $18,799. About 5.0% of families and 6.7% of the population were below the poverty line, including 6.7% of those under age 18 and 11.8% of those age 65 or over.

== Government ==
Jackson city vote by party in presidential elections
Year	Democratic	Republican	Third Parties
2020	22.70% 1,742	75.20% 5,765	2.10% 158
2016	18.50% 1,364	77.60% 5,719	3.90% 290
2012	21.46% 1,827	76.57% 6,518	1.97% 168
2008	27.02% 2,281	71.88% 6,069	1.10% 93
2004	25.82% 2,028	73.69% 5,787	0.48% 38
2000	27.58% 1,871	70.13% 4,757	2.29% 155
1996	33.73% 2,061	58.56% 3,578	7.71% 471

== Education ==
Most of Jackson is in Jackson R-2 School District. A small portion is in the Cape Girardeau Public Schools. Jackson R-2 operates Jackson High School. The Cape Girardeau district operates Central High School.

Jackson has a public library, a branch of the Riverside Regional Library.

== Media ==
The local newspaper is The Cash-Book Journal

== Notable people ==
- Linda M. Godwin, NASA astronaut
- Gary Friedrich, writer of the comic book Ghost Rider
- Roy Thomas, writer (Marvel and DC Comics) and editor (Marvel). Writer of various movie scripts
- Louis C. Wagner Jr., United States Army four-star general
- Marie Elizabeth Watkins Oliver, "the Betsy Ross of Missouri" was the designer and creator of the Missouri State Flag
- Edwin C. Horrell, American football player and coach
