= Big Hill, Nova Scotia =

Community in Nova Scotia, Canada

Coordinates: 46°9′59″N 60°38′32″W

Big Hill in Nova Scotia

Big Hill is a small community in the Canadian province of Nova Scotia, located in Victoria County on Cape Breton Island.
