= Daviess County Courthouse (Missouri) =

- U.S. National Register of Historic Places
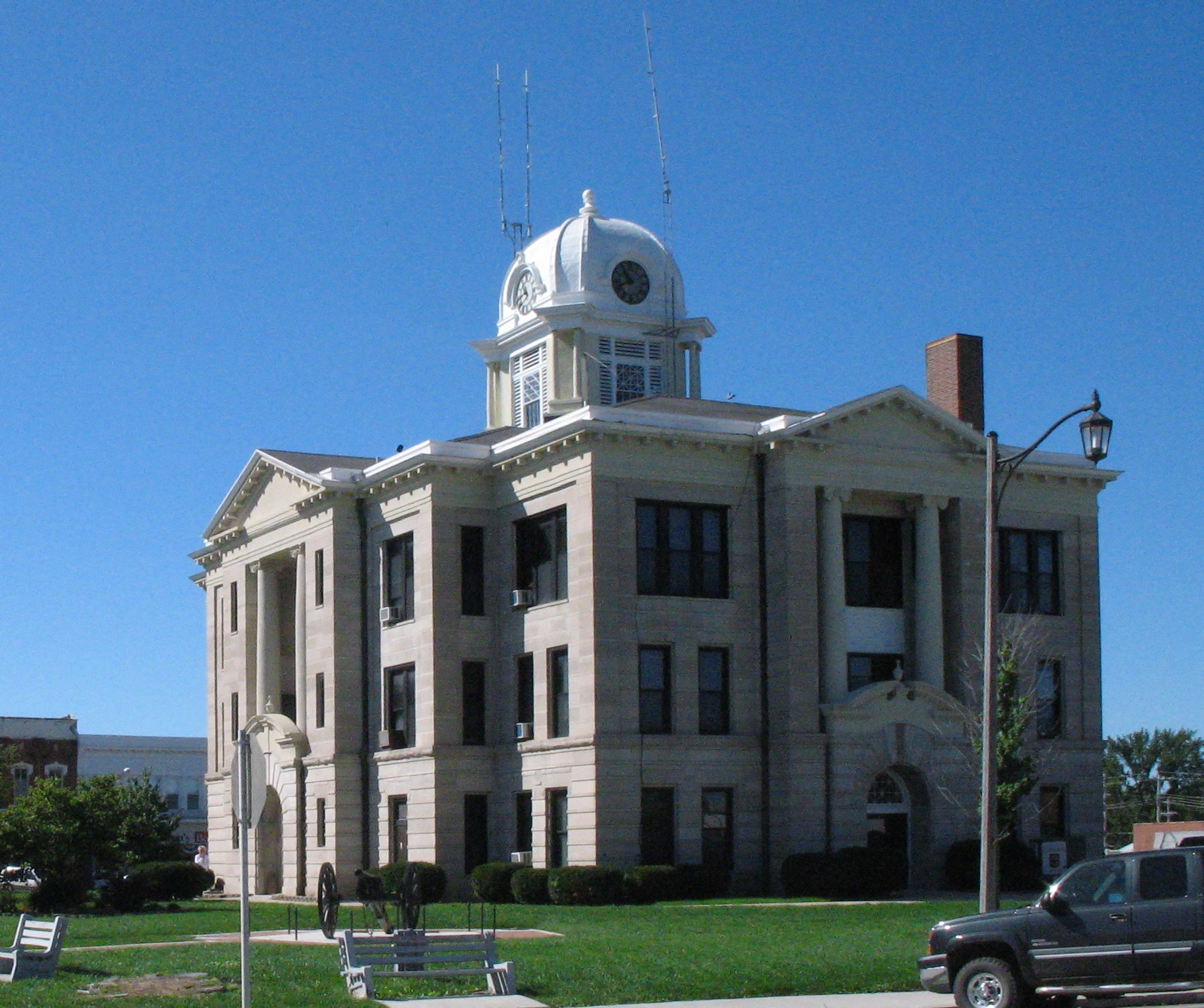

- Location within Missouri Location within the United States
- Location: Public Square, Gallatin, Missouri
- Coordinates: 39°54′55″N 93°57′44″W
- Built: 1908
- Built by: M. T. Lewman
- Architect: P. H. Weathers
- Architectural style: Late 19th and 20th Century Revivals, Second Renaissance Revival
- NRHP reference No.: 80002350
- Added to NRHP: November 14, 1980

Daviess County Courthouse is a historic courthouse located at Gallatin, Daviess County, Missouri. It was designed by P. H. Weathers and built in 1907–1908. It is a three-story, Renaissance Revival style, cross-plan building of smooth stone. It is topped with a low cross-gable roof with a wooden bell-shaped clock tower in the center.

It was listed on the National Register of Historic Places in 1980.
