= Co-operative Publishing Company Building =

- U.S. National Register of Historic Places
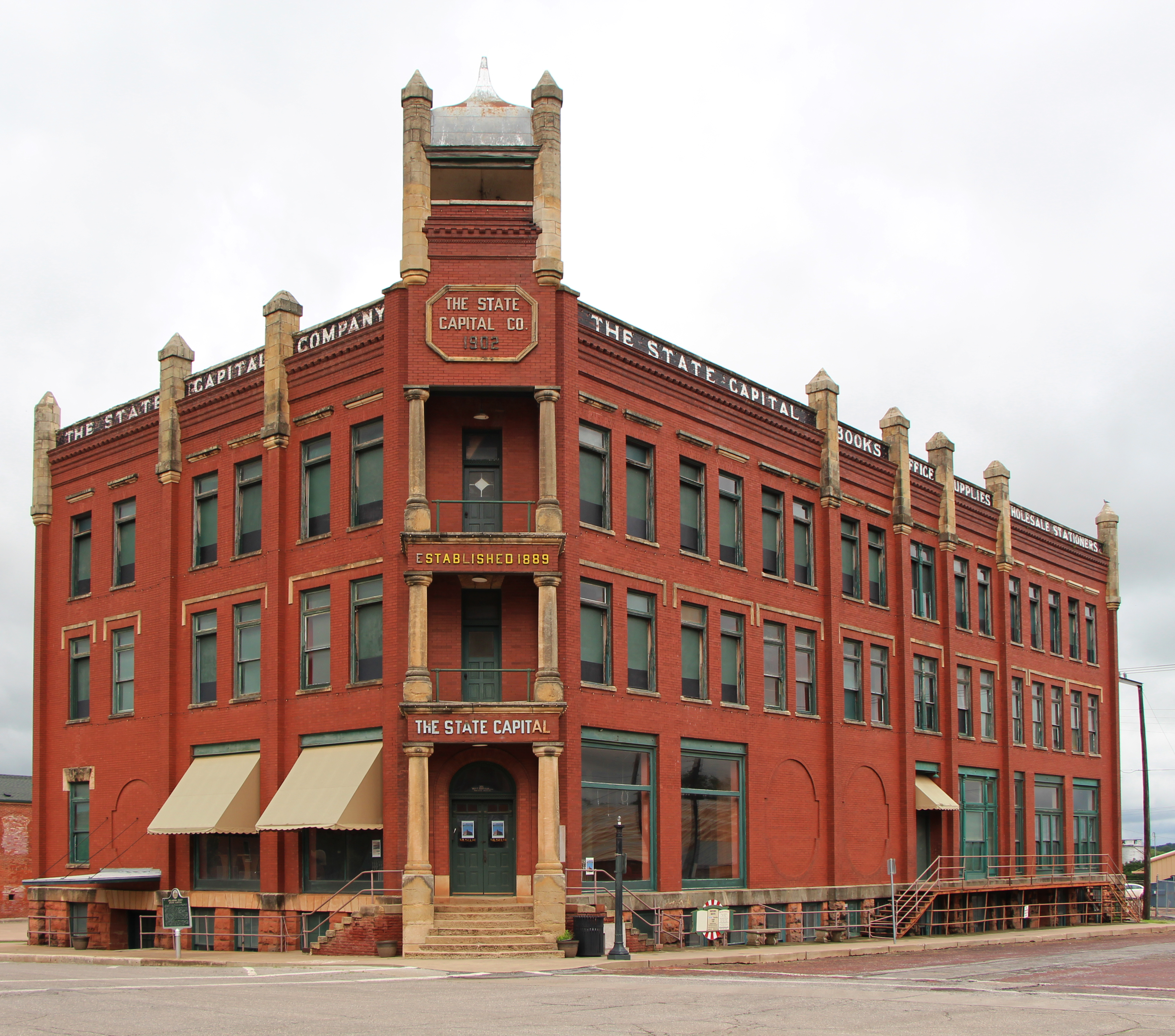
- The building in 2015

- Location within Oklahoma Location within the United States
- Location: Harrison Ave. and 2nd St., Guthrie, Oklahoma
- Coordinates: 35°52′36.5″N 97°25′40.5″W
- Area: less than one acre
- Built: 1902
- Architect: Joseph Pierre Foucart
- NRHP reference No.: 73001564
- Added to NRHP: March 7, 1973

The Co-operative Publishing Company Building is a historic building in Guthrie, Oklahoma, that is listed on the National Register of Historic Places. The building was the home of the State Capital newspaper from 1902 to 1911, and it replaced another building on the same site, which the paper had been using since 1890.

== Company history and predecessor building ==
Founded on March 30, 1889, by Frank Hilton Greer and initially located in Winfield, Kansas, the State Capital newspaper moved to Guthrie less than one month later, with the Land Rush of 1889, and changed from being a weekly to a daily. The first edition in Guthrie was published on April 22, 1889, and the State Capital became "the first daily paper ever published in what is now Oklahoma". The paper was originally based at a different location in Guthrie, but in 1890 Greer moved the business into rented space in a building at Second and Harrison Streets—the site of the surviving building. As the newspaper's circulation grew, additional space was rented, and in 1897 the paper purchased the three-story building (which had four floors, counting the basement). After the building's top-floor occupant moved out in 1900, the newspaper/publishing company occupied the entire building, giving it a total of 10,000 square feet of floor space. Greer was soon employing up to one hundred people, and conducting business 24 hours a day, six days a week.

== Surviving building ==
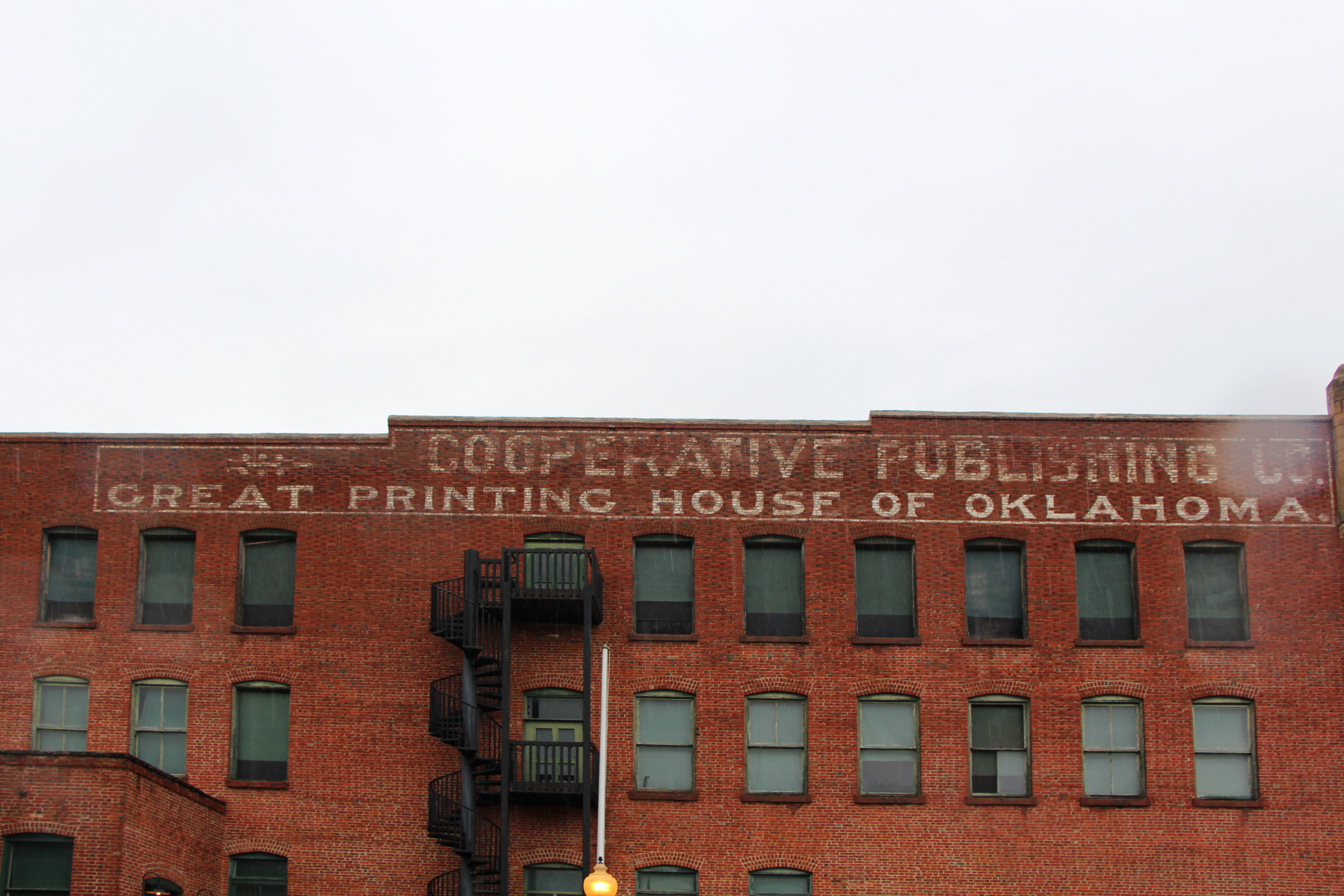
Cooperative Publishing Company lettering on side of building

The building that the State Capital had used since 1890 burned to the ground in 1902 and was replaced by this four-story structure, on the same site. The new building was designed by Joseph Pierre Foucart, and completed in that year. It was erected with the help of subscriptions in the amount of $50,000.

Having been the first newspaper published in the Oklahoma Territory, the State Capital grew into the largest printing house west of the Mississippi River. The State Capital Printing Company was awarded all the Territorial printing and soon became the territory's largest printing, book-binding, and school-supply business. In 1911, Greer sold the Oklahoma State Capital to the Guthrie Daily Leader, its competitor, and publication under the State Capital title ended. After 1911, the building continued to be used for printing and book-binding, its owner now being the Co-operative Publishing Company, which was the largest publishing company in Oklahoma for many years.

== Use as museum ==
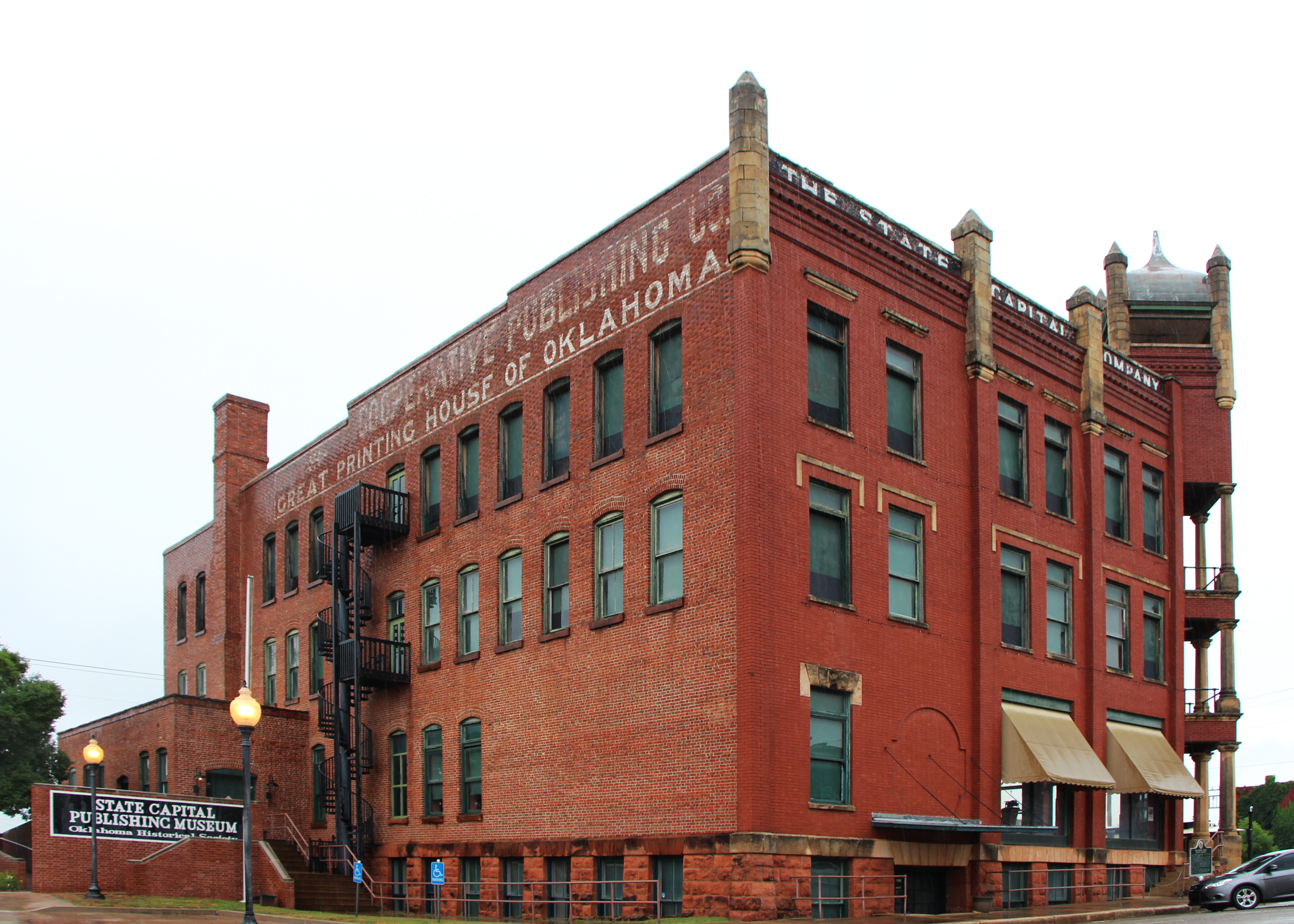
Rear of building, with museum sign

In 1975, the building was acquired by the Oklahoma Historical Society, who had plans to outfit it as a publishing museum. The State Capital Publishing Museum opened in 1983. In the 1990s and again in the 2000s, budget cuts led to the trimming of staff and programs at the museum, and unexpected building-maintenance problems in 2012 led to a decision to close the museum indefinitely. As of 2016, the museum has remained closed since 2012.
