= National Register of Historic Places listings in Cape Girardeau County, Missouri =

Location of Cape Girardeau County in Missouri

This is a list of the National Register of Historic Places listings in Cape Girardeau County, Missouri.

This is intended to be a complete list of the properties and districts on the National Register of Historic Places in Cape Girardeau County, Missouri, United States. Latitude and longitude coordinates are provided for many National Register properties and districts; these locations may be seen together in a map.

There are 62 properties and districts listed on the National Register in the county.

This National Park Service list is complete through NPS recent listings posted July 17, 2026.

== Current listings ==
	Name on the Register	Image	Date listed	Location	City or town	Description
1	Arena Building		July 23, 2026 (#100013231)	410 Kiwanis Drive; 37°18′49″N 89°33′31″W	Cape Girardeau	
2	B'Nai Israel Synagogue	B'Nai Israel Synagogue	May 5, 2004 (#04000385)	121 S. Main St. 37°18′04″N 89°31′09″W	Cape Girardeau	
3	Bainbridge Ferry		June 21, 2007 (#07000573)	County Road 630; 37°24′43″N 89°26′16″W	Cape Girardeau	
4	Bainbridge Ferry Rd.		June 21, 2007 (#07000577)	County Road 623; 37°26′11″N 89°28′07″W	Cape Girardeau	
5	Bennett-Tobler-Pace-Oliver House	Bennett-Tobler-Pace-Oliver House	April 18, 1985 (#85000853)	224 E. Adams; 37°22′54″N 89°39′56″W	Jackson	
6	Big Hill Farmstead Historic District		December 22, 1999 (#99001598)	2246 Route PP; 37°21′49″N 89°41′26″W	Jackson	
7	Broadway Commercial Historic District	Broadway Commercial Historic District	September 6, 2016 (#15001017)	600, 700 & 800 blocks of Broadway & 210 N. Ellis St. 37°18′24″N 89°31′39″W	Cape Girardeau	
8	Broadway Theatre	Broadway Theatre	June 15, 2015 (#15000354)	805 Broadway St. 37°18′24″N 89°31′42″W	Cape Girardeau	
9	Broadway and North Fountain Street Historic District	Broadway and North Fountain Street Historic District	July 15, 2003 (#03000654)	320-400 Broadway St. and 221 N. Fountain St. 37°18′23″N 89°31′20″W	Cape Girardeau	
10	Broadway-Middle Commercial Historic District	Broadway-Middle Commercial Historic District	July 24, 2007 (#07000753)	500 block of Broadway St. and 100 block of N. Middle St.; also south side 400 block of Broadway; 37°18′24″N 89°31′27″W	Cape Girardeau	Second set of boundaries represents a boundary increase of September 4, 2013
11	Burfordville Covered Bridge	Burfordville Covered Bridge	May 19, 1970 (#70000325)	Eastern edge of Burfordville on County Road HH; 37°22′02″N 89°48′09″W	Burfordville	
12	Burfordville Mill	Burfordville Mill	May 27, 1971 (#71000463)	Off Route 34; 37°22′05″N 89°48′06″W	Burfordville	
13	Abraham Byrd House	Abraham Byrd House	June 21, 2007 (#07000572)	2832 County Road 442; 37°27′05″N 89°41′58″W	Jackson	
14	Cape Girardeau Commercial Historic District	Cape Girardeau Commercial Historic District	July 20, 2000 (#00000820)	100 block of N. Main and the 100 block of Broadway Sts.; also 101 N. Main St.; also 127 N. Water St. 37°18′20″N 89°31′06″W	Cape Girardeau	101 N. Main and 127 N. Water represent boundary increases of July 11, 2007 and August 29, 2008 respectively
15	Cape Girardeau Court of Common Pleas	Cape Girardeau Court of Common Pleas	October 25, 2010 (#10000856)	44 N. Lorimier St. 37°18′18″N 89°31′12″W	Cape Girardeau	
16	Central High School	Central High School	July 18, 2008 (#08000663)	101 S. Pacific St. 37°18′12″N 89°31′50″W	Cape Girardeau	
17	Dr. Jean Chapman House	Dr. Jean Chapman House	March 15, 2016 (#16000084)	1150 N. Henderson Ave. 37°19′12″N 89°31′57″W	Cape Girardeau	
18	George Boardman Clark House	George Boardman Clark House	July 22, 1994 (#94000738)	6 S. Fountain St. 37°18′12″N 89°31′20″W	Cape Girardeau	
19	Courthouse-Seminary Neighborhood Historic District	Courthouse-Seminary Neighborhood Historic District	September 9, 2010 (#10000723)	Roughly bounded by Middle St., Themis St., Main St., Aquamsi St., and Morgan Oaks St. 37°18′05″N 89°31′17″W	Cape Girardeau	
20	Erlbacher Buildings	Erlbacher Buildings	July 8, 2009 (#09000502)	1105 and 1107 Broadway St. 37°18′30″N 89°31′56″W	Cape Girardeau	
21	Esquire Theater	Esquire Theater	September 15, 2005 (#05001025)	824 Broadway St. 37°18′26″N 89°31′45″W	Cape Girardeau	
22	First Baptist Church		June 27, 2023 (#100009100)	200 Broadway St. 37°18′22″N 89°31′10″W	Cape Girardeau	
23	Fort D	Fort D	August 1, 2019 (#100004219)	920 Fort St. 37°17′27″N 89°31′35″W	Cape Girardeau	
24	Frizel-Welling House	Frizel-Welling House	June 25, 1999 (#99000742)	209 W. Main St. 37°22′57″N 89°40′10″W	Jackson	
25	Glenn House	Glenn House	October 11, 1979 (#79001354)	325 S. Spanish St. 37°17′53″N 89°31′14″W	Cape Girardeau	
26	Green's Ferry		June 21, 2007 (#07000571)	On the Mississippi River at the end of Green's Ferry Rd. 37°27′04″N 89°27′27″W	Cape Girardeau	
27	Haarig Commercial Historic District	Haarig Commercial Historic District	July 20, 2000 (#00000819)	Along sections of the 600 block of Good Hope St. and 300 block of S. Sprigg St. 37°17′58″N 89°31′38″W	Cape Girardeau	
28	Hanover Lutheran Church	Hanover Lutheran Church	September 14, 1987 (#87001575)	2949 Perryville Rd. 37°21′10″N 89°33′37″W	Cape Girardeau	
29	William Henry and Lilla Luce Harrison House	William Henry and Lilla Luce Harrison House	December 6, 2005 (#05001375)	313 Themis St. 37°18′17″N 89°31′17″W	Cape Girardeau	
30	Himmelberger and Harrison Building	Himmelberger and Harrison Building	July 17, 2003 (#03000653)	400 Broadway St. 37°18′24″N 89°31′21″W	Cape Girardeau	
31	House at 323 Themis Street	House at 323 Themis Street	June 27, 1997 (#97000629)	323 Themis St. 37°18′18″N 89°31′19″W	Cape Girardeau	
32	Huhn-Harrison House	Huhn-Harrison House	June 27, 2002 (#02000699)	340 S. Lorimier St. 37°17′52″N 89°31′18″W	Cape Girardeau	
33	Jackson Uptown Commercial Historic District	Jackson Uptown Commercial Historic District	February 1, 2006 (#05001562)	Roughly bounded by Court, Main, Missouri, and High Sts. 37°22′57″N 89°40′06″W	Jackson	
34	Jefferson School	Jefferson School	May 12, 2009 (#09000300)	731 Jefferson Ave. 37°17′49″N 89°31′45″W	Cape Girardeau	
35	Kage School	Kage School	September 29, 2005 (#05001090)	3110 Kage Rd. 37°19′57″N 89°34′45″W	Cape Girardeau	
36	Klostermann Block	Klostermann Block	July 22, 1994 (#94000739)	7, 9, 11, 13, and 15 S. Spanish St. 37°18′11″N 89°31′11″W	Cape Girardeau	
37	Edward S. and Mary Annatoile Albert Lilly House	Edward S. and Mary Annatoile Albert Lilly House	June 20, 2008 (#08000535)	129 S. Lorimier St. 37°18′05″N 89°31′18″W	Cape Girardeau	
38	Main-Spanish Commercial Historic District	Main-Spanish Commercial Historic District	December 30, 2008 (#08001259)	Roughly the 100 blocks of Main and Spanish Sts. and adjacent portions of Themis and Independence Sts. 37°18′16″N 89°31′08″W	Cape Girardeau	
39	Marquette Hotel	Marquette Hotel	April 11, 2002 (#02000356)	338 Broadway St. 37°18′24″N 89°31′19″W	Cape Girardeau	
40	McKendree Chapel	McKendree Chapel	April 13, 1987 (#06000042)	Off Interstate 55; also the southern side of Bainbridge Rd., 0.5 miles west of Interstate 55; 37°22′41″N 89°37′07″W	Jackson	Specific address represents a boundary increase of February 14, 2006
41	Miller-Seabaugh House and Dr. Seabaugh Office Building		January 4, 1996 (#95001494)	341 Market St. 37°25′58″N 89°47′52″W	Millersville	
42	Old Appleton Bridge	Old Appleton Bridge	August 25, 2009 (#09000648)	Main St. over Apple Creek; 37°35′52″N 89°42′50″W	Old Appleton	
43	Old Lorimier Cemetery	Old Lorimier Cemetery	September 28, 2005 (#05001091)	500 N. Fountain St. 37°18′40″N 89°31′12″W	Cape Girardeau	
44	Oliver-Leming House	Oliver-Leming House	September 12, 1980 (#80002323)	740 North St. 37°18′35″N 89°31′40″W	Cape Girardeau	
45	Abraham Russell Ponder House	Abraham Russell Ponder House	March 27, 2008 (#08000226)	141 S. Louisiana Ave. 37°18′09″N 89°32′19″W	Cape Girardeau	
46	Frederick W. and Mary Karau Pott House	Frederick W. and Mary Karau Pott House	June 25, 1999 (#99000745)	826 Themis St. 37°18′22″N 89°31′46″W	Cape Girardeau	
47	James Reynolds House	James Reynolds House	October 13, 1983 (#83003942)	623 N. Main St. 37°18′41″N 89°31′05″W	Cape Girardeau	
48	Shady Grove Cemetery		June 27, 2022 (#100007826)	502 Cty. Rd. 211; 37°15′53″N 89°37′34″W	Gordonville vicinity	
49	August and Amalia Shivelbine House	August and Amalia Shivelbine House	June 25, 1999 (#99000743)	303 S. Spanish St. 37°17′55″N 89°31′14″W	Cape Girardeau	
50	South Middle Street Historic District	South Middle Street Historic District	October 14, 2009 (#09000829)	513 William St. and 202-230 and 203-229 S. Middle St. 37°18′00″N 89°31′29″W	Cape Girardeau	
51	Southeast Missourian Building	Southeast Missourian Building	June 1, 2005 (#05000509)	301 Broadway St. 37°18′22″N 89°31′16″W	Cape Girardeau	
52	St. James A.M.E. Church	St. James A.M.E. Church	January 15, 2014 (#13001085)	516 North St. 37°18′34″N 89°31′26″W	Cape Girardeau	
53	St. Vincent De Paul Catholic Church	St. Vincent De Paul Catholic Church	April 12, 1982 (#82003131)	131 S. Main St. 37°18′03″N 89°31′10″W	Cape Girardeau	
54	St. Vincent's College Building	St. Vincent's College Building	September 30, 2005 (#05001092)	201 Morgan Oak St. 37°17′47″N 89°31′16″W	Cape Girardeau	
55	Col George C. Thilenius House	Col George C. Thilenius House	April 14, 1983 (#83000974)	100 Longview Pl. 37°18′24″N 89°32′30″W	Cape Girardeau	
56	Trail of Tears State Park Archeological Site	Trail of Tears State Park Archeological Site	December 2, 1970 (#70000326)	Address Restricted	Oriole	An archeological site in Trail of Tears State Park
57	Turner Hall		April 14, 2025 (#100011649)	300 Broadway Street; 37°18′22″N 89°31′15″W	Cape Girardeau	
58	Julius Vasterling Building	Julius Vasterling Building	June 17, 2009 (#09000439)	633-637 Broadway St. 37°18′23″N 89°31′35″W	Cape Girardeau	
59	Warehouse Row Historic District	Warehouse Row Historic District	December 4, 2004 (#04001285)	19 N. Water St. 37°18′20″N 89°31′04″W	Cape Girardeau	
60	Robert Felix and Elma Taylor Wichterich House	Robert Felix and Elma Taylor Wichterich House	August 12, 1999 (#99000987)	300 Good Hope St. 37°17′57″N 89°31′19″W	Cape Girardeau	
61	J. Maple and Grace Senne Wilson House	J. Maple and Grace Senne Wilson House	July 7, 2015 (#15000365)	344 N. Ellis St. 37°18′34″N 89°31′39″W	Cape Girardeau	
62	Wood Building	Wood Building	December 10, 2003 (#03001269)	1-3 S. Frederick and 605-607 Independence Sts. 37°18′14″N 89°31′33″W	Cape Girardeau	

== See also ==
- List of National Historic Landmarks in Missouri
- National Register of Historic Places listings in Missouri
