= Green's Ferry =

- U.S. National Register of Historic Places
- Location within Missouri Location within the United States
- Location: On the Mississippi River at the end of Green's Ferry Rd., Cape Girardeau, Missouri
- Coordinates: 37°27′04″N 89°27′27″W
- Area: 1.8 acres (0.73 ha)
- Built: 1798
- MPS: Cherokee Trail of Tears MPS
- NRHP reference No.: 07000571
- Added to NRHP: June 21, 2007

Green's Ferry, also known as the Waller's Ferry and Smith's Ferry, is a historic ferry landing on the western shore of the Mississippi River at Cape Girardeau, Missouri. The ferry was one of two locations on the Mississippi River utilized by the Cherokee to cross from Illinois to Missouri on the Trail of Tears of 1837–1839.

It was listed on the National Register of Historic Places in 2007.

Joseph Waller, died 1821, began the original ferry sometime between 1797 and 1799 when Cape Girardeau was still a Spanish district. Subsequent to the Louisiana Purchase he received a license to operate in 1806 from the Quarter Sessions of Cape Girardeau County.

Following the opening of the Illinois Territory to settlement, Joseph Waller sold the ferry and 640 acres of land to Green for $400 on 15 February 1817. Waller used the proceeds to buy Mississippi River bottom land in Union County Illinois Territory across the river from the Missouri landing.

Green operated the ferry at least through 1838, and then sold it to Thompson Smith (1804-1847) whose wife Mahala Williams (1806-1858) was a granddaughter of Joseph Waller.

Medad Randol (c1769-1833) operated a similar ferry at nearby Bainbridge. See Bainbridge Ferry His first wife, Deborah Waller (died before 1813) was a daughter of Joseph Waller.

Joseph Waller's original 640 acre landgrant forms much of Missouri's Trail of Tears State Park. See https://www.ancestry.com/discoveryui-content/view/133098:2179
