= Cape Girardeau Public Schools =

School district in Missouri, U.S.

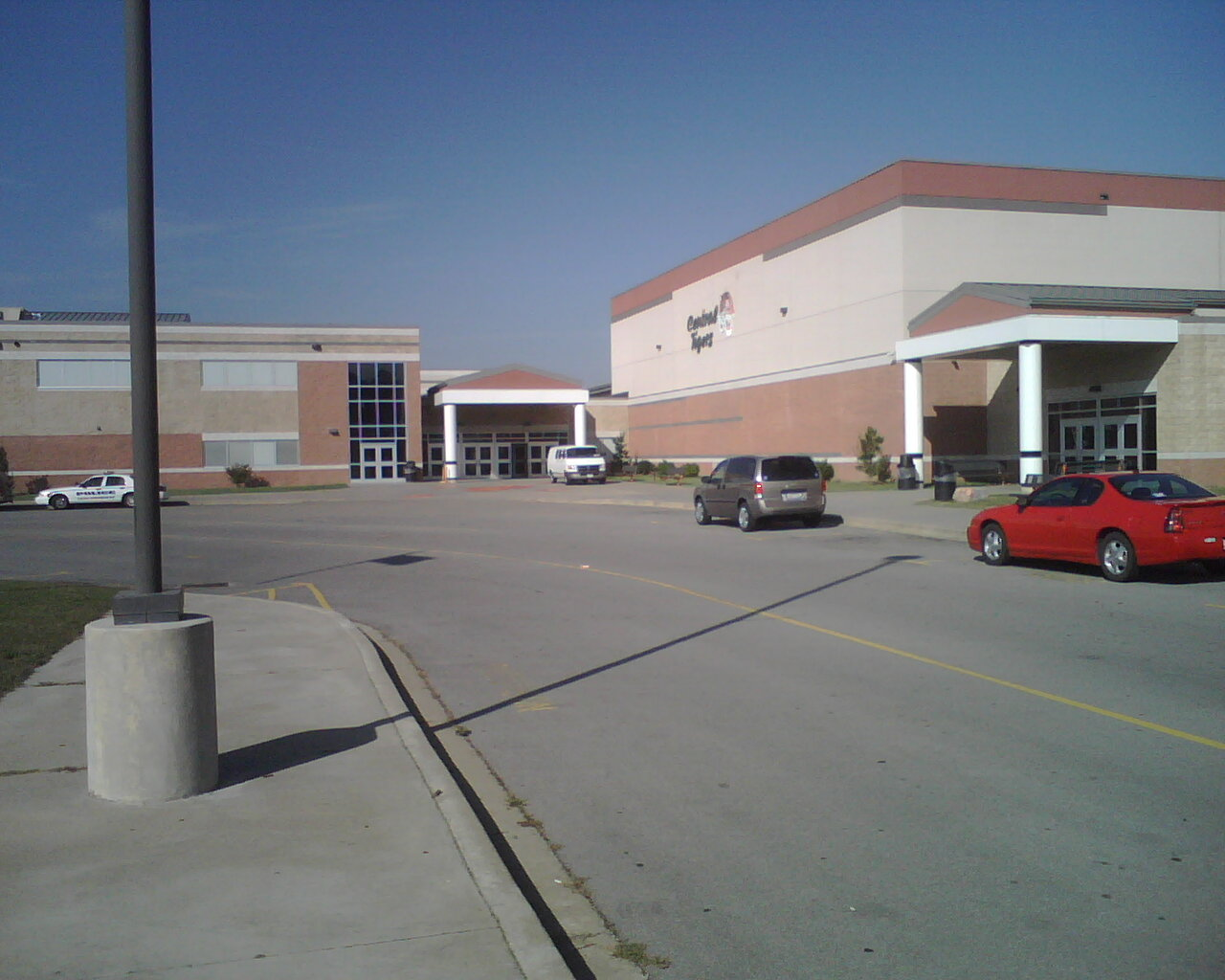
Cape Central High School

Cape Girardeau Public Schools is the school district serving Cape Girardeau, Missouri.

The district includes the vast majority of Cape Girardeau, as well as the majority of Dutchtown and small sections of Jackson and Scott City.

The City of Cape Girardeau annexed over 50% of the Kage School District territory in 1967.

== Schools ==
Senior high schools:

- Central Senior High School

Junior high schools:

- Central Junior High School

Middle schools:

- Central Middle School

Elementary schools:

- Alma Schrader Elementary
- Blanchard Elementary
- Clippard Elementary
- Franklin Elementary
- Jefferson Elementary

Alternative schools:

- Career and Technology Center
- Alternative Education Center
