= Broadway and North Fountain Street Historic District =

Historic district in Missouri, United States

- U.S. National Register of Historic Places
- U.S. Historic district
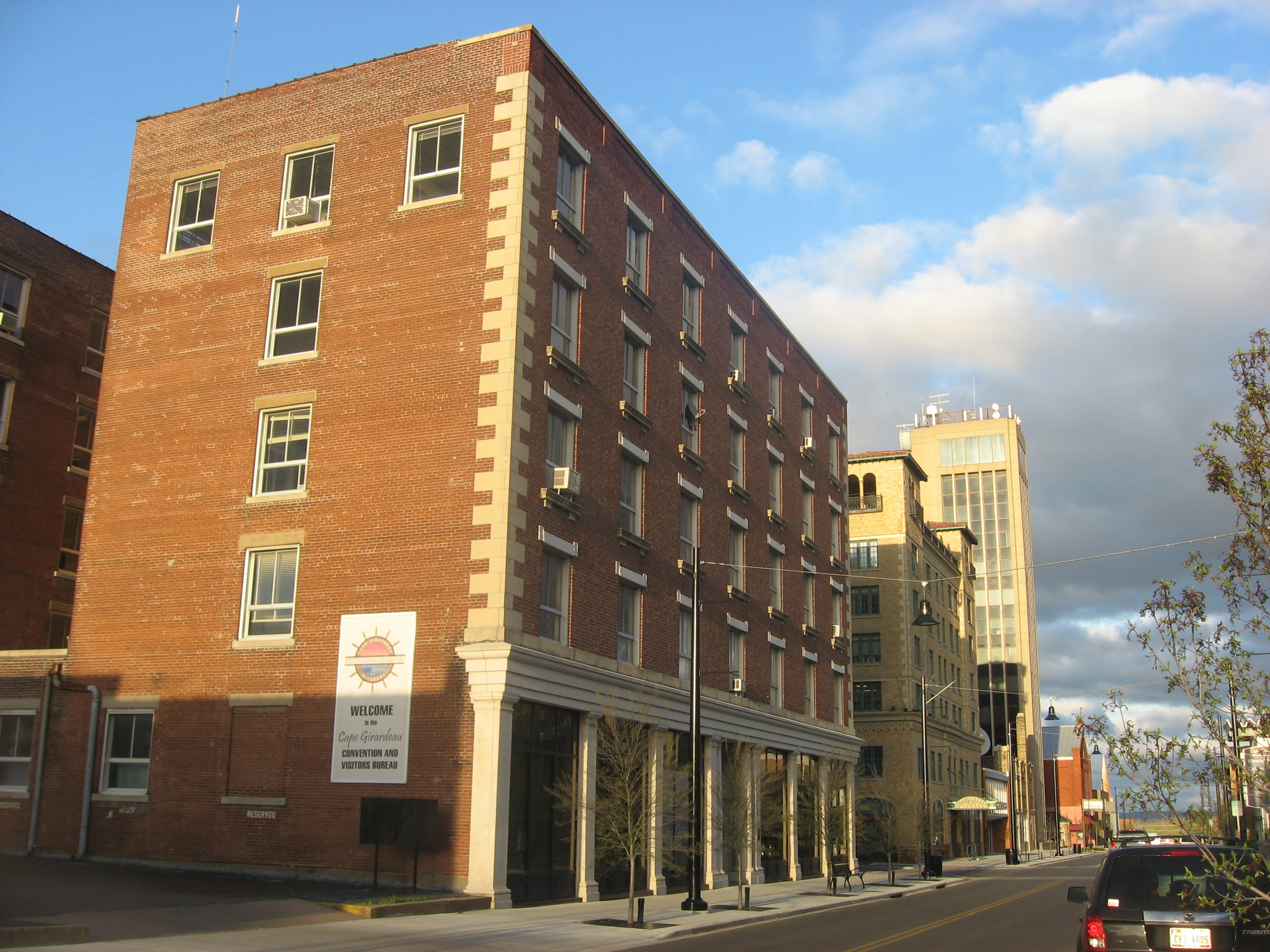
- Broadway and Fountain in Cape Girardeau, April 2013

- Location within Missouri Location within the United States
- Location: 320-400 Broadway and 221 North Fountain St., Cape Girardeau, Missouri
- Coordinates: 37°18′30″N 89°31′19″W
- Area: 3 acres (1.2 ha)
- Architect: Manske, Walter P.; Bartling, George P. et al
- Architectural style: Mission/spanish Revival
- MPS: Cape Girardeau, Missouri MPS
- NRHP reference No.: 03000654
- Added to NRHP: July 15, 2003

Broadway and North Fountain Street Historic District is a national historic district located at Cape Girardeau, Cape Girardeau County, Missouri. The district encompasses four contributing buildings in the central business district of Cape Girardeau built between 1907 and 1937. Located in the district is the separately listed Mission Revival style Marquette Hotel. The remaining buildings are the Surety Savings and Loan Association (c. 1924), Himmelberger & Harrison Building (1907), and Rueseler Motor Company (c. 1916, 1937).

It was listed on the National Register of Historic Places in 2003.
