= Main–Spanish Commercial Historic District =

Historic district in Missouri, United States

- U.S. National Register of Historic Places
- U.S. Historic district
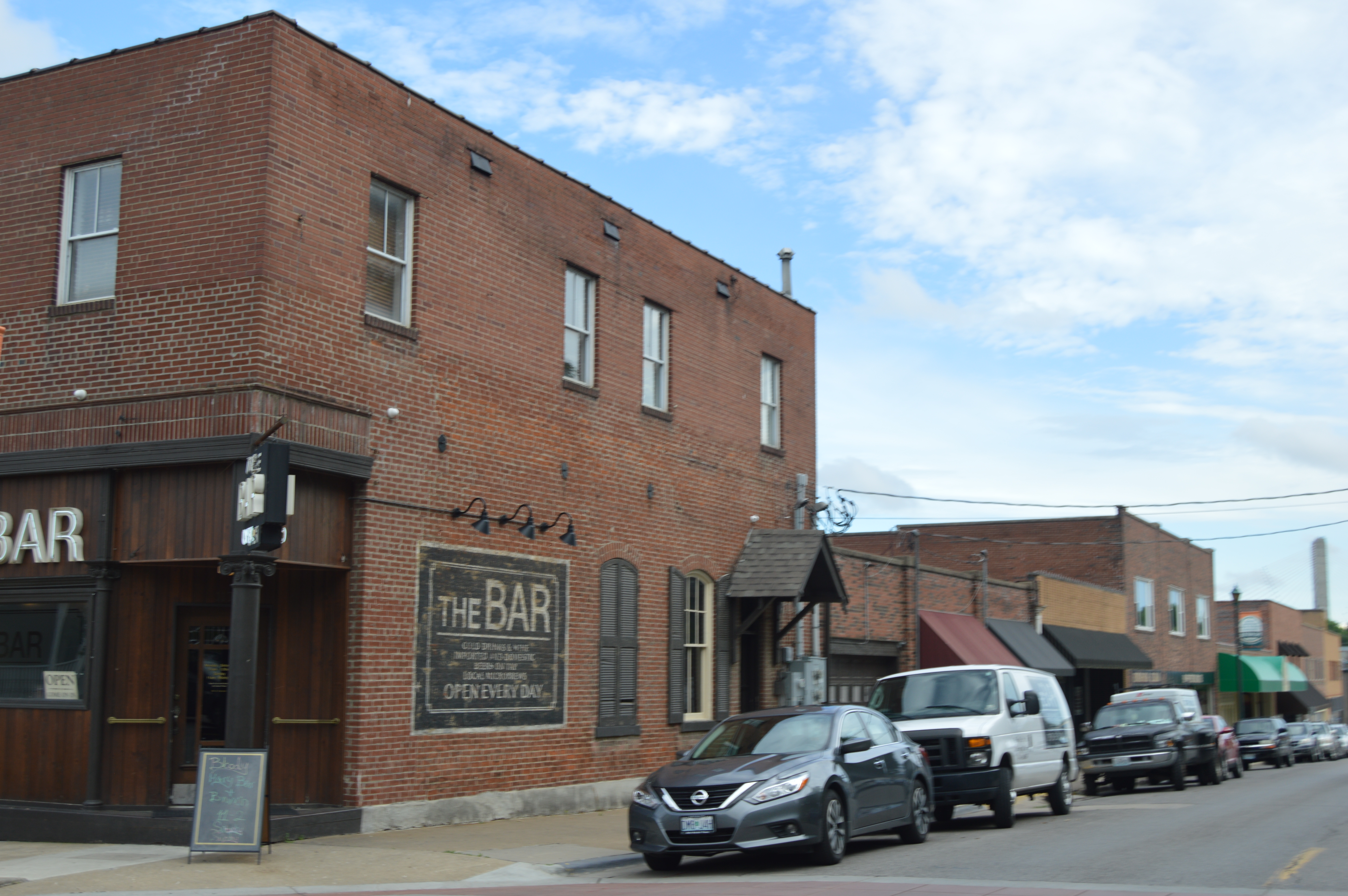
- Spanish south of Themis, Cape Girardeau, June 2016

- Location within Missouri Location within the United States
- Location: Roughly the 100 blocks of Main and Spanish Sts. and adjacent portions of Themis and Independence, Cape Girardeau, Missouri
- Coordinates: 37°18′16″N 89°31′08″W
- Area: 5.2 acres (2.1 ha)
- Built: 1880
- Architectural style: Colonial Revival, Early Commercial, Moderne
- MPS: Cape Girardeau, Missouri MPS
- NRHP reference No.: 08001259
- Added to NRHP: December 30, 2008

Main–Spanish Commercial Historic District is a national historic district located around Main and Spanish Streets in Cape Girardeau, Missouri. The district encompasses 26 contributing buildings in the central business district of Cape Girardeau. It developed between about 1880 and 1958, and includes representative examples of Italianate, Colonial Revival, Mission Revival, and Streamline Moderne style architecture. Located in the district is the separately listed Klostermann Block. Other notable buildings are F.W. Woolworth Company (1950), J.C. Penney Company (1928), Kraft Bakery (c. 1884), Great Atlantic & Pacific Tea Co (A&P) (1941), and Millikan Motor Co. (1941).

It was listed on the National Register of Historic Places in 2008.
