= Kage School =

- U.S. National Register of Historic Places
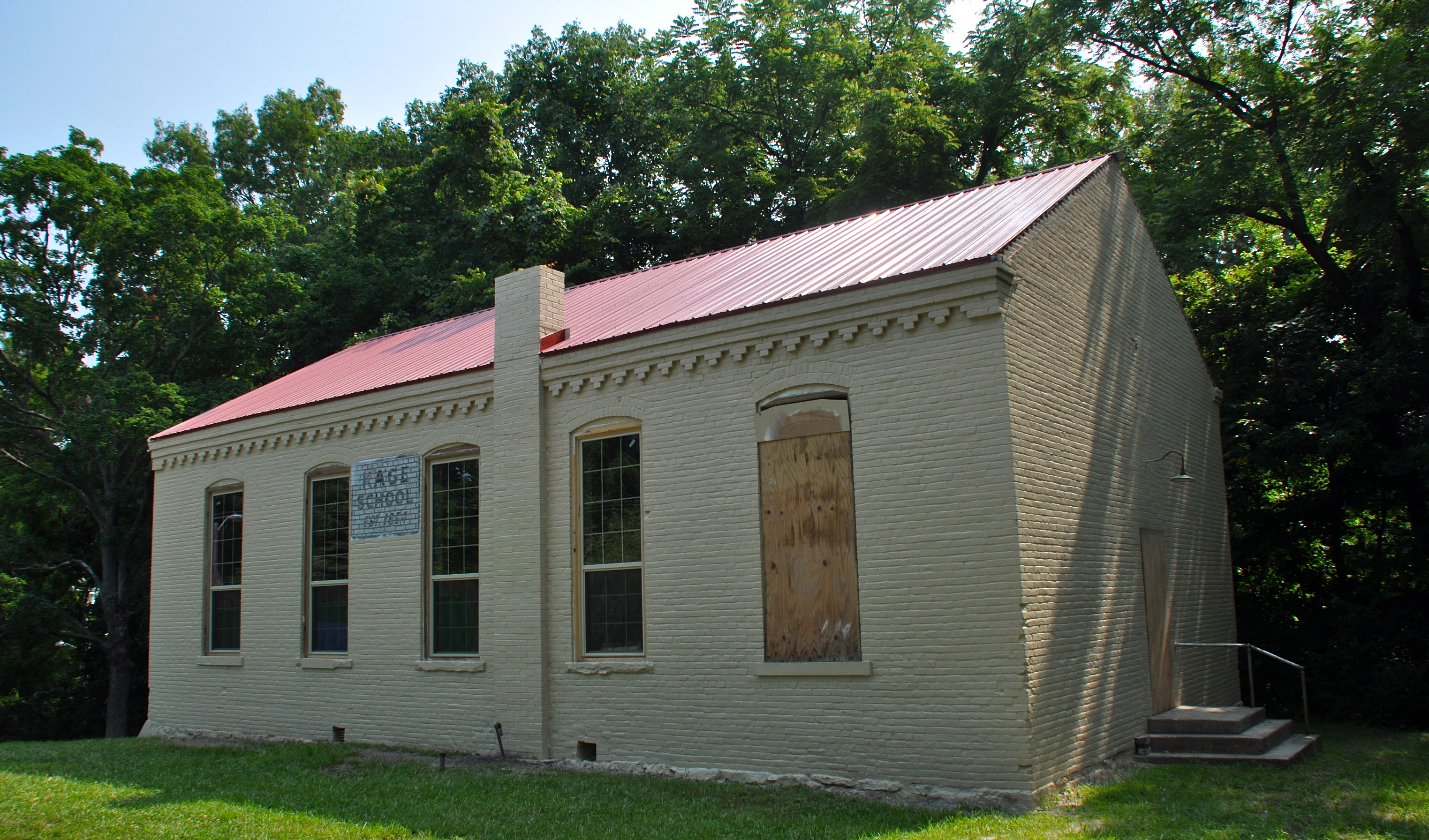

- Location within Missouri
- Location: 3110 Kage Rd., Cape Girardeau, Missouri
- Coordinates: 37°19′57″N 89°34′45″W
- Area: less than one acre
- Built: 1880
- Architectural style: One Room Schoolhouse
- NRHP reference No.: 05001090
- Added to NRHP: September 29, 2005

Kage School is a former one-room schoolhouse in the city limits of Cape Girardeau, Missouri. It is listed in the National Register of Historic Places (NRIS#05001090). While it was in operation it was a part of School District No. 52, then located northwest of the City of Cape Girardeau in unincorporated Cape Girardeau County. The school served eight grade levels (educational stages).

During the district's history students who matriculated to high school attended Cape Girardeau Central High School and Campus High School.

== History ==
In 1849, the school's first building, made of logs, opened, and a newer brick building opened in 1880. There was a proposal to build a new building in 1930 but the $12,000 ($231274.9 according to inflation) bond was voted down. At the time the school had 27 students. At a late point the school installed a partition, with grades 1-4 on one side and 5-8 on the other. Throughout its history the student body was mostly white with a minority of African-American students attending.

In 1949 the first proposal to consolidate the Kage School District with the Cape Girardeau School District occurred. Voters rejected it and subsequent annual consolidation proposals; at the time there was a national trend of consolidating schools in order to allow students to specialize in mathematics and science courses. The City of Cape Girardeau annexed over 50% of the Kage School District territory in 1967, and the school shut down the following year. It had 16 students in its final year of operation. Elementary students were reassigned to Hawthorn School. The school itself now resides in the city limits.

Keith Deimund, a former student, acquired the property and held it for at least 10 years as he wanted to make sure it was preserved. He sold it to Rick Hetzel around 2014, and Hetzel converted the building into a guest house. It now operates as the Historic Kage School Guest Cottage.

== Structure and surroundings ==
The building uses elements of Missouri-German architecture. This building has a 13 feet (4.0 m) ceiling.
