= Erlbacher Buildings =

- U.S. National Register of Historic Places
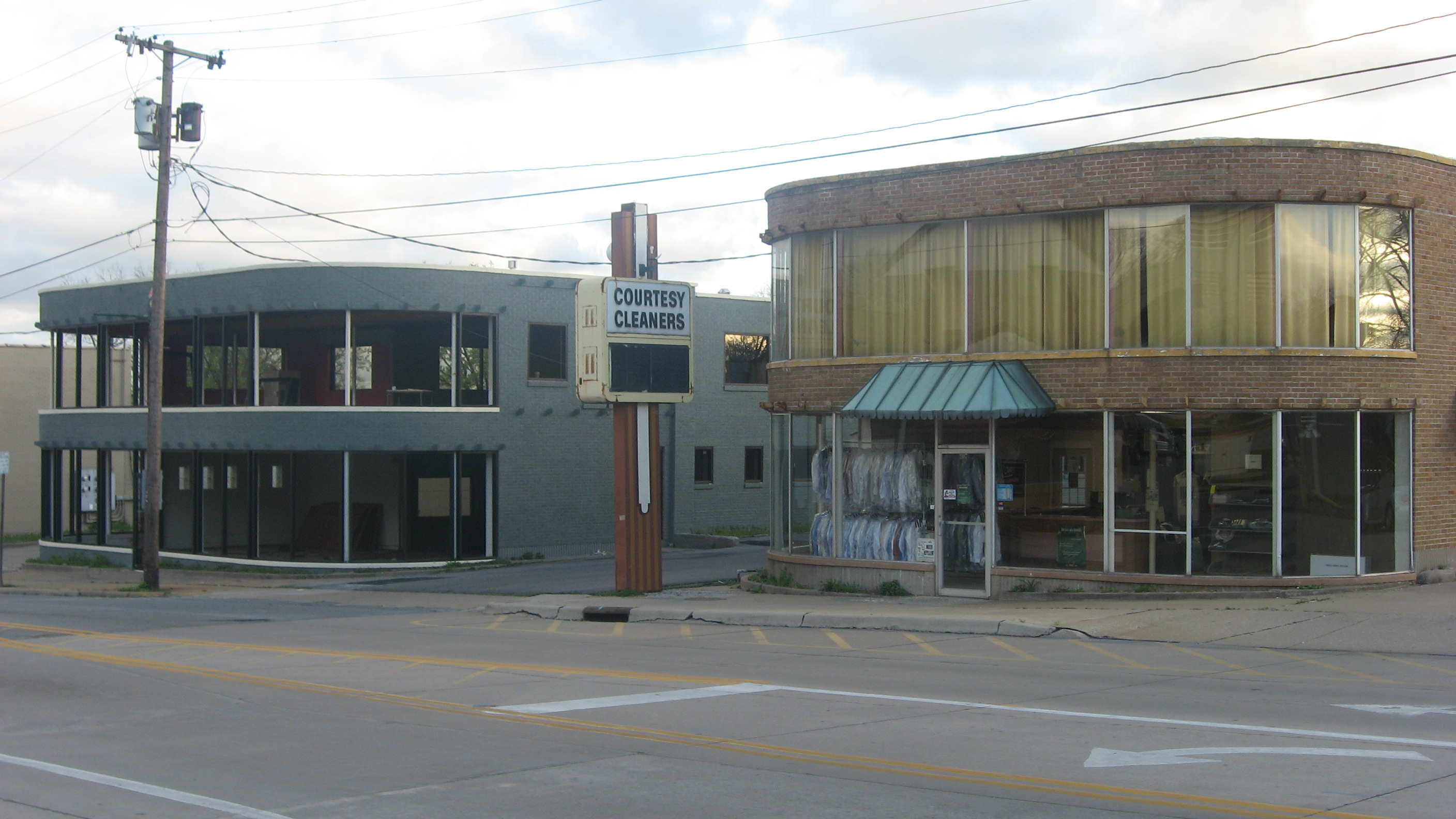
- Erlbacher Buildings, April 2013

- Location within Missouri Location within the United States
- Location: 1105 and 1107 Broadway, Cape Girardeau, Missouri
- Coordinates: 37.30835°N 89.53241°W
- Area: less than one acre
- Built: 1957-1958
- Architect: Long, Harold W.
- Architectural style: Moderne
- NRHP reference No.: 09000502
- Added to NRHP: July 8, 2009

Erlbacher Buildings are two historic commercial buildings located at Cape Girardeau, Missouri. They were built in 1957–1958, and are two-story, long, narrow, flat-roofed Streamline Moderne style brick buildings with round corners on the façade and horizontal bands of windows.

It was listed on the National Register of Historic Places in 2009.
