= Broadway Theatre (Cape Girardeau, Missouri) =

- Broadway Theater
- U.S. National Register of Historic Places
- U.S. Historic district – Contributing property
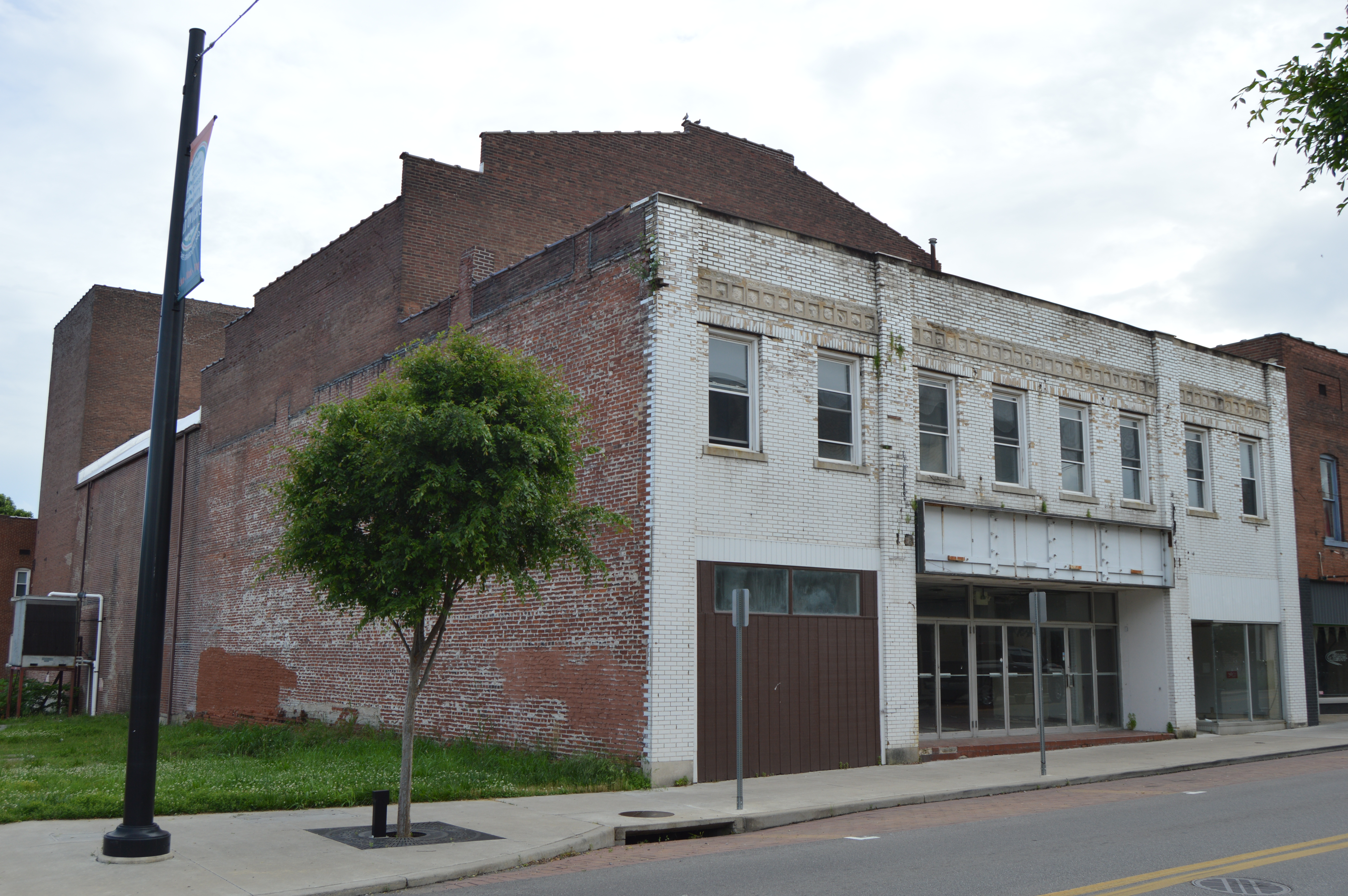
- Broadway Theatre, June 2016

- Location within Missouri Location within the United States
- Location: 805 Broadway St., Cape Girardeau, Missouri
- Coordinates: 37°18′24″N 89°31′42″W
- Area: 0.3 acres (0.12 ha)
- Built: 1921
- Architectural style: two-part commercial block
- NRHP reference No.: 15000354
- Added to NRHP: June 15, 2015

Broadway Theater, also known as the New Broadway Theatre, Fox Broadway, Kerasotes Broadway Theatre, is a historic vaudeville house and movie theater located at Cape Girardeau, Missouri. It is located in the Broadway Commercial Historic District and was listed on the National Register of Historic Places in 2015. The building was destroyed by a fire in 2021, and in 2023, the former theatre had started redevelopment with retail and residential spaces, with phase one being completed in 2024.

== History ==
Built in 1921, it is a two-story red brick building with a white glazed brick façade. The structure originally included a theater and storefronts on the ground level, with office space above. The theatre formally opened on December 24, 1921, with the showing of The Sheik, a 1921 American silent romantic drama film, directed by George Melford, starring Rudolph Valentino and Agnes Ayres. The building had a seating capacity of 1269 when it first opened, and was described as having "all the conveniences and safeguards humanly possible". By the next month in January 1922, the local newspaper reported that the theatre "was packed to overflowing and hundreds were turned away".

The theatre closed for the first time in October 1960, and was then acquired by Kerasotes, who reopened it in 1973 as a first-run movie theatre. Approximately ten years later, it was closed again, and its final reincarnation was as a dollar movie theatre in the early 1990s. The theater finally closed its door permanently in 1997.

In the early 2020s, local business owner Suzanne Hightower spearheaded preservation efforts for the long-vacant Broadway Theater building, saving it from demolition. The theater had a major fire March 31, 2021. In 2023, the Cape Girardeau city council voted to redevelop the theater with retail and residential spaces. In 2024, phase one of the project had been completed.
