= Broadway–Middle Commercial Historic District =

Historic district in Missouri, United States

- U.S. National Register of Historic Places
- U.S. Historic district
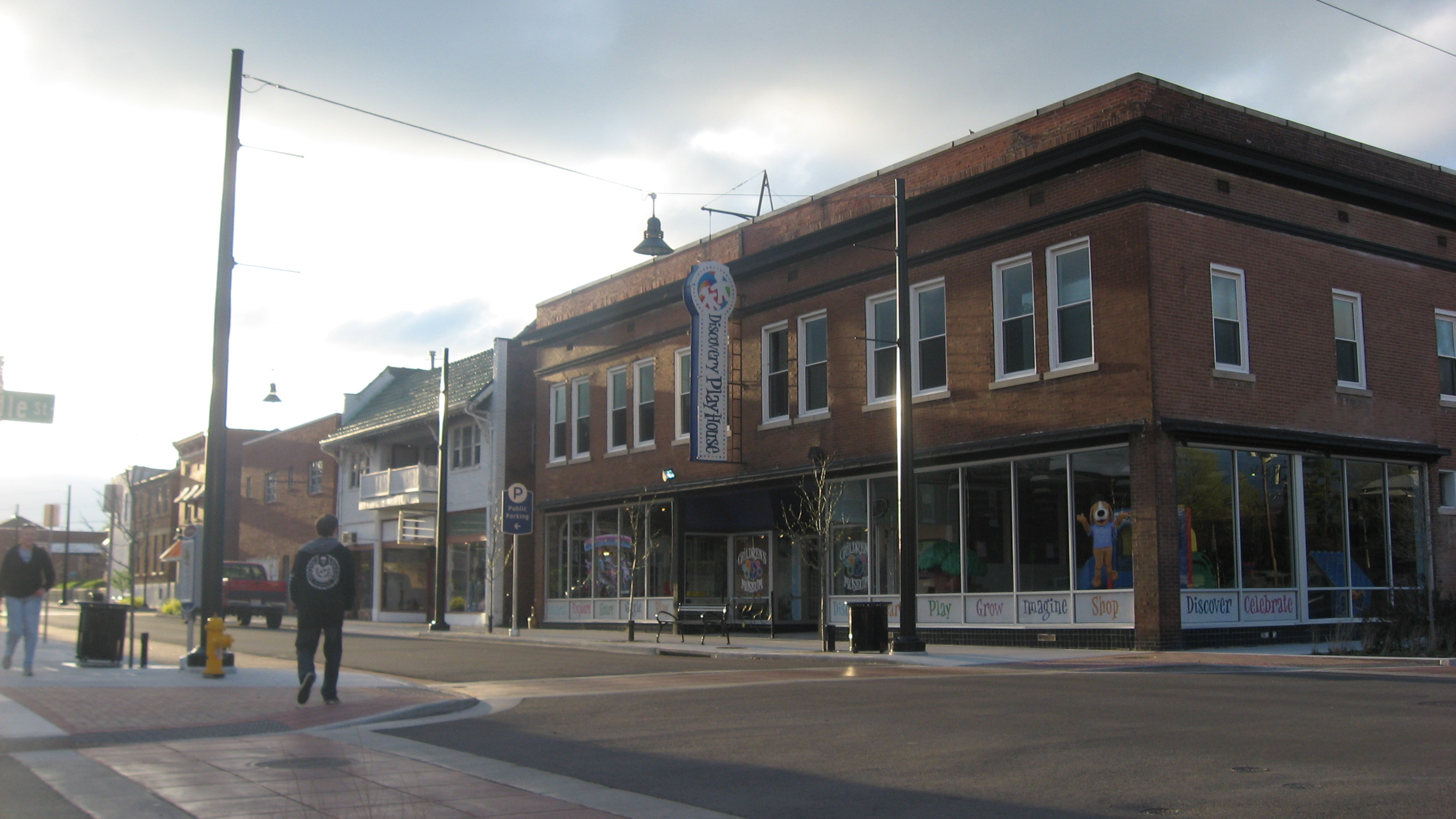
- Broadway west of Middle, Cape Girardeau, April 2013

- Location within Missouri Location within the United States
- Location: 500 Blk of Broadway and 100 blk of N. Middle St., S. side 400 blk. of Broadway, Cape Girardeau, Missouri
- Coordinates: 37°18′24″N 89°31′27″W
- Area: 3.8 acres (1.5 ha)
- Built by: Vogelsang Brothers
- Architect: Parlow & Deas
- Architectural style: Greek Revival, Italianate, et al
- MPS: Cape Girardeau, Missouri MPS
- NRHP reference No.: 07000753, 13000672
- Added to NRHP: July 24, 2007, September 4, 2013

Broadway–Middle Historic District is a national historic district located at Cape Girardeau, Cape Girardeau County, Missouri. The district encompasses 24 contributing buildings in the central business district of Cape Girardeau. It developed between about 1868 and 1957, and includes representative examples of Greek Revival, Italianate, and Mission Revival style architecture. Notable buildings include Walther's Furniture and Undertaking (1916), I. Ben Miller Store (c. 1915), Lueders Studio (c. 1925), Graessle Building (c. 1908), Charles Rueseler Building (c. 1880), and A.C. Vasterling Building (c. 1903).

It was listed on the National Register of Historic Places in 2007 with a boundary increase in 2013.
