= James Reynolds House =

Historic house in Missouri, United States

- U.S. National Register of Historic Places
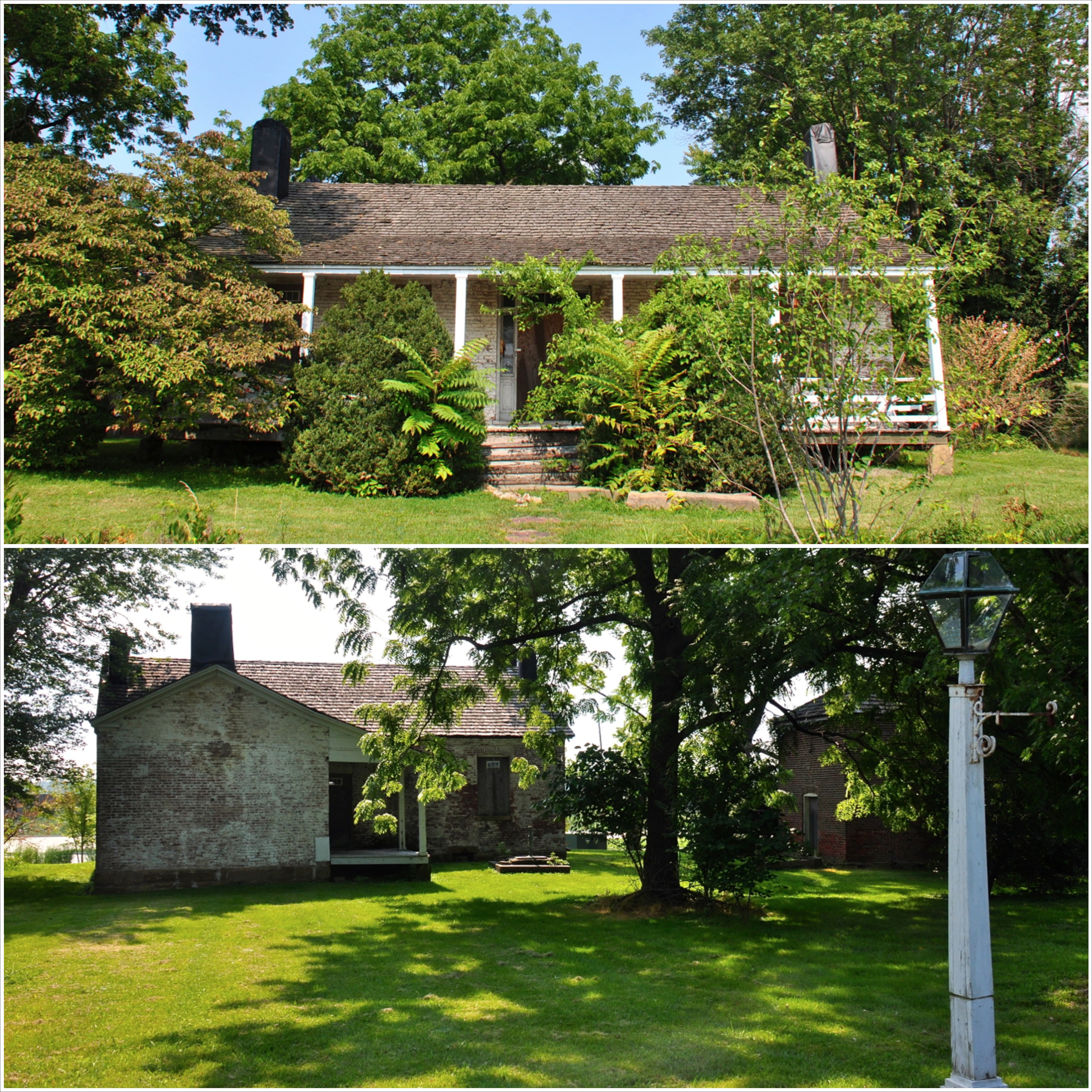
- James Reynolds House, July 2014

- Location within Missouri Location within the United States
- Location: 623 N. Main St., Cape Girardeau, Missouri
- Coordinates: 37°18′41″N 89°31′5″W
- Area: 0.4 acres (0.16 ha)
- Built: 1857
- Built by: Lansom, Joseph
- Architect: Deane, Edwin Branch
- Architectural style: Colonial, French Colonial
- NRHP reference No.: 83003942
- Added to NRHP: October 13, 1983

James Reynolds House is a historic home located at Cape Girardeau, Missouri. It was built in 1857, and is a 1 1/2-story, painted brick dwelling with a one-story rear kitchen wing. Its design was influenced by French Colonial architecture. It sits on a coursed rubble sandstone foundation and features a full-width front porch.

It was listed on the National Register of Historic Places in 1983.
