= Julius Vasterling Building =

- U.S. National Register of Historic Places
- U.S. Historic district – Contributing property
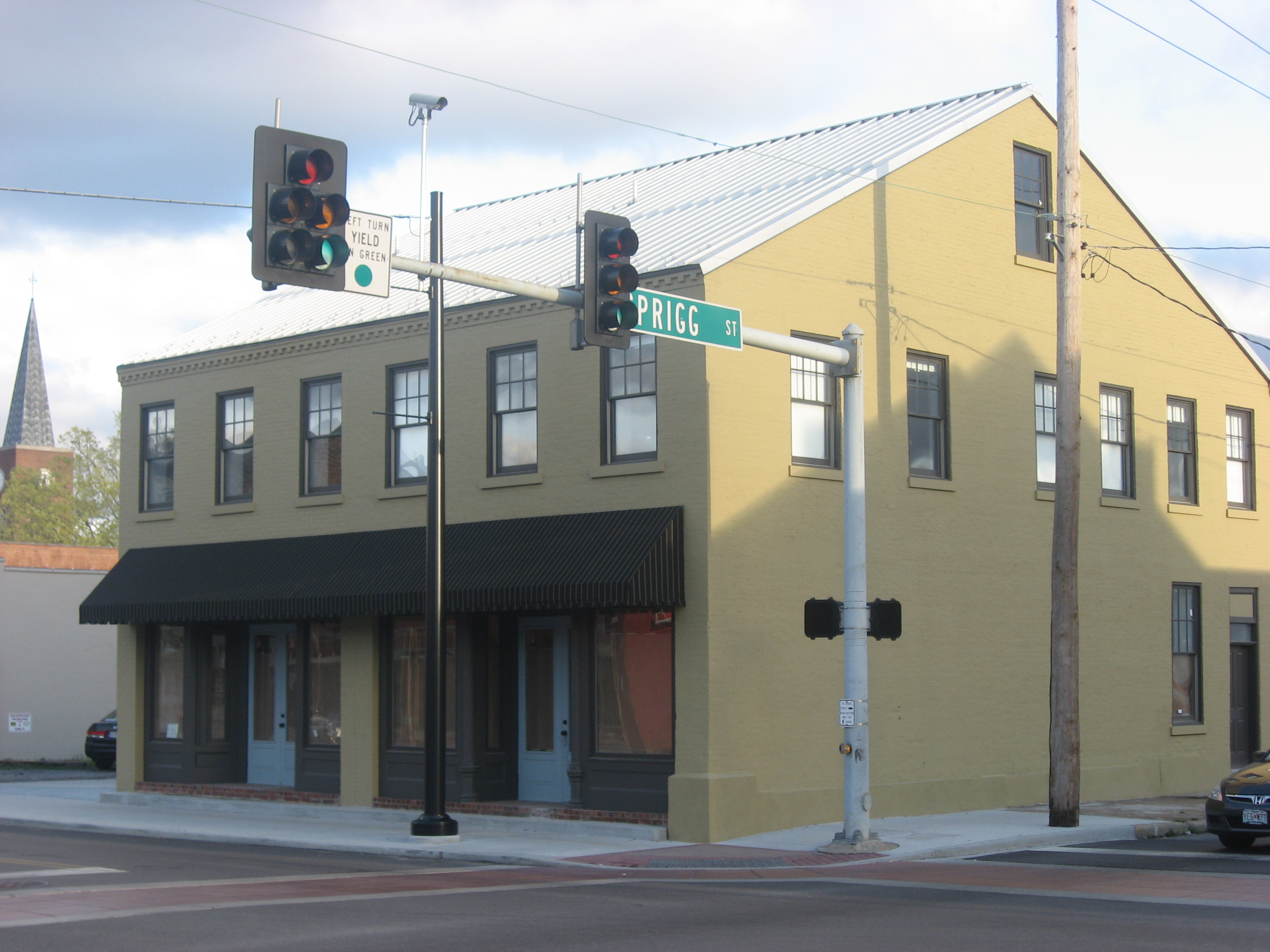
- Julius Vasterling Building, April 2013

- Location within Missouri Location within the United States
- Location: 633-637 Broadway, Cape Girardeau, Missouri
- Coordinates: 37°18′29″N 89°31′35″W
- Area: 1 acre (0.40 ha)
- Built: c. 1868, 1884, 1925-1927
- Built by: Vasterling, Julius
- Architectural style: Early Commercial
- MPS: Cape Girardeau, Missouri MPS
- NRHP reference No.: 09000439
- Added to NRHP: June 17, 2009

Julius Vasterling Building, also known as the Seehausen Sanitary Meat Market, is a historic commercial building located at Cape Girardeau, Missouri. It built about 1868, and is a painted brick, two-part commercial block with three storefronts and residential space on the second level. It has a stone foundation and a seamless metal, side gabled roof. An addition was built about 1884 and a section originally built as a dwelling was converted to a storefront in 1925–1927.

It was listed on the National Register of Historic Places in 2009. It is located in the Broadway Commercial Historic District.
