= Oriole, Missouri =

Unincorporated community in Missouri, U.S.

Coordinates: 37°26′32″N 89°32′07″W

Oriole is an unincorporated community in eastern Cape Girardeau County, in the U.S. state of Missouri.

The community is at the intersection of routes V and Y approximately eight miles northeast of Jackson. The Trail of Tears State Park is three miles to the east on Route V.

== History ==
A post office called Oriole was established in 1879, and remained in operation until 1905. The origin of the name Oriole is obscure.
