= Cape Girardeau Court of Common Pleas =

- U.S. National Register of Historic Places
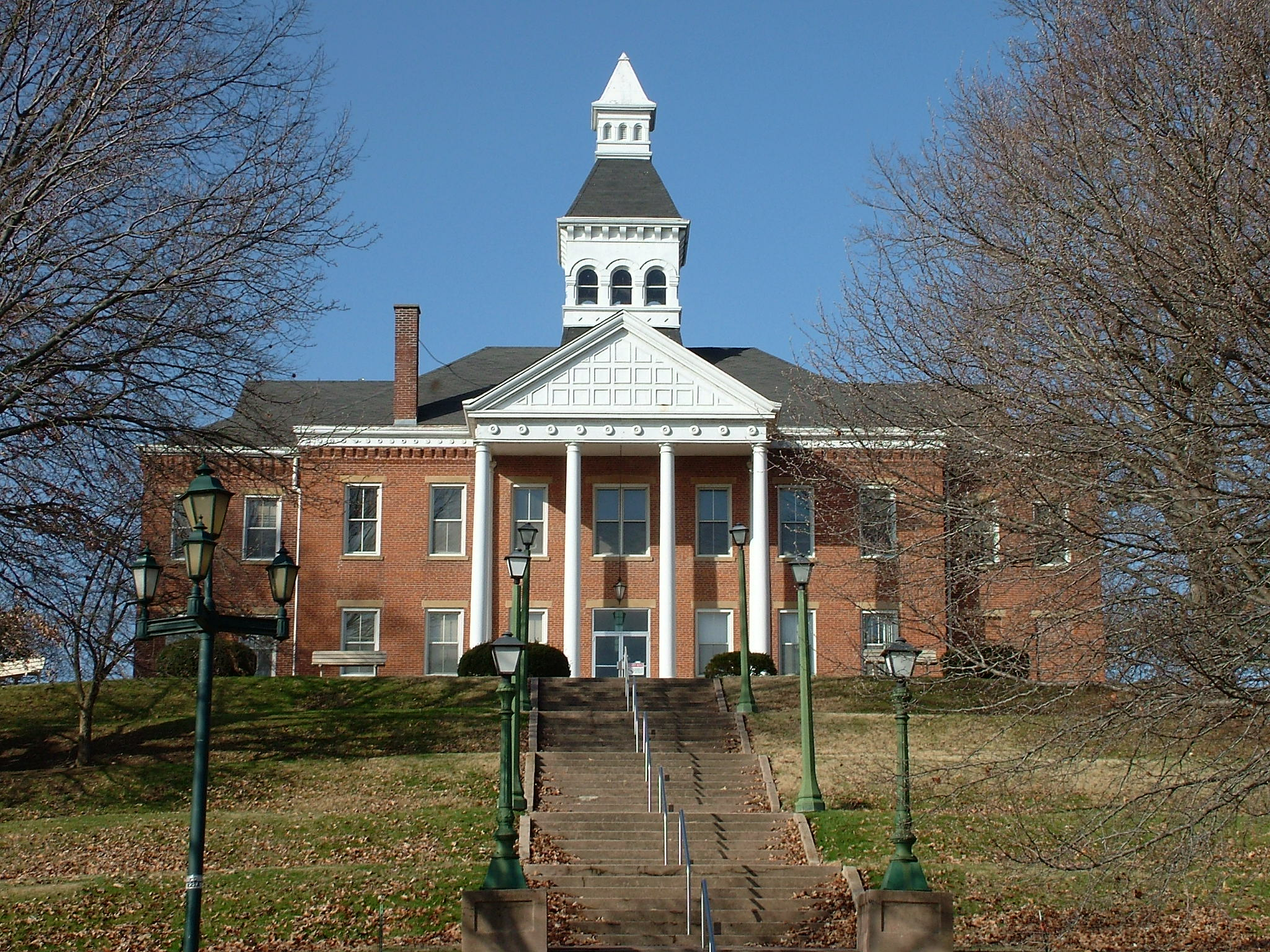
- Cape Girardeau Court of Common Pleas, January 2006

- Location within Missouri Location within the United States
- Location: 344 N. Ellis St., Cape Girardeau, Missouri
- Coordinates: 37°18′18″N 89°31′12″W
- Area: 4.6 acres (1.9 ha)
- Built: 1854, 1888, 1959
- Architects: Lansman, Joseph; Legg, Jerome B.; Boardman, John
- Architectural style: Federal, Classical Revival
- NRHP reference No.: 10000856
- Added to NRHP: October 25, 2010

Cape Girardeau Court of Common Pleas is a historic courthouse located at Cape Girardeau, Missouri. It was built in 1854 in the Federal style, and is a two-story, red brick building on a limestone foundation with a partial basement, hipped roof and cupola. Additions made in 1888, added Classical Revival style design elements including a pedimented portico. An addition was constructed in 1959. Also on the property are the contributing concrete stairway (1900), a fountain (1911), a bandstand (1934) and a sundial (1938).

It was listed on the National Register of Historic Places in 2010.
