= Haarig Commercial Historic District =

Historic district in Missouri, United States

- U.S. National Register of Historic Places
- U.S. Historic district
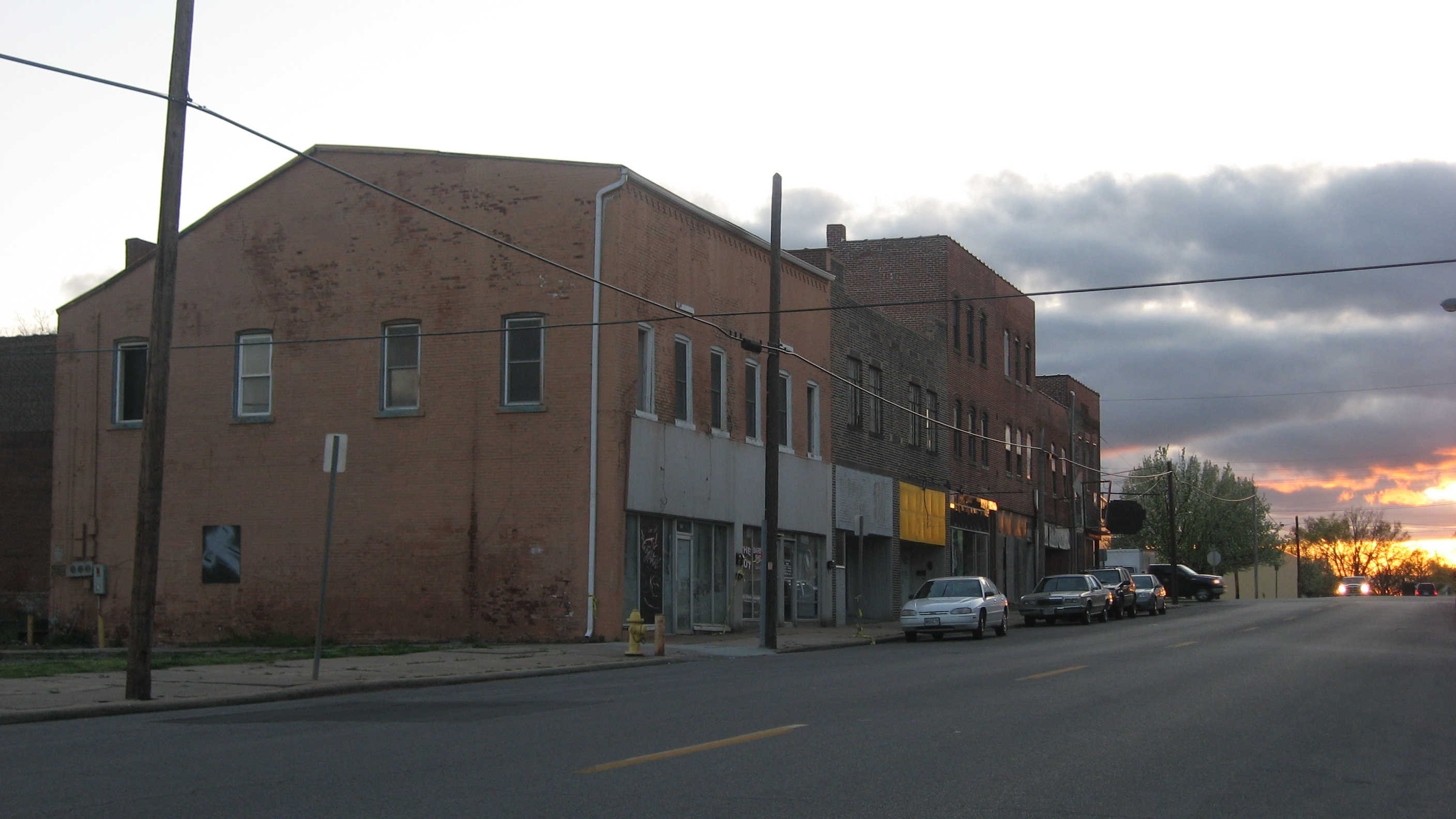
- Haarig Commercial Historic District, April 2013

- Location within Missouri Location within the United States
- Location: Along sections of the 600 Blk. of Good Hope St. and 300 Blk. of S. Sprigg St., Cape Girardeau, Missouri
- Coordinates: 37°17′58″N 89°31′38″W
- Area: 1.1 acres (0.45 ha)
- Architectural style: Italianate, Tudor Revival
- MPS: Cape Girardeau, Missouri MPS
- NRHP reference No.: 00000819
- Added to NRHP: July 20, 2000

Haarig Commercial Historic District is a national historic district located at Cape Girardeau, Missouri. In 2000, the area listed was 1.1 acres (0.45 ha) and included 13 contributing buildings. It developed between about 1875 and 1950, and includes representative examples of Italianate and Tudor Revival architecture. They are predominantly two- and three-story brick commercial buildings.

It was listed on the National Register of Historic Places in 2000.
