= Broadway Commercial Historic District =

Historic district in Missouri, United States

- U.S. National Register of Historic Places
- U.S. Historic district
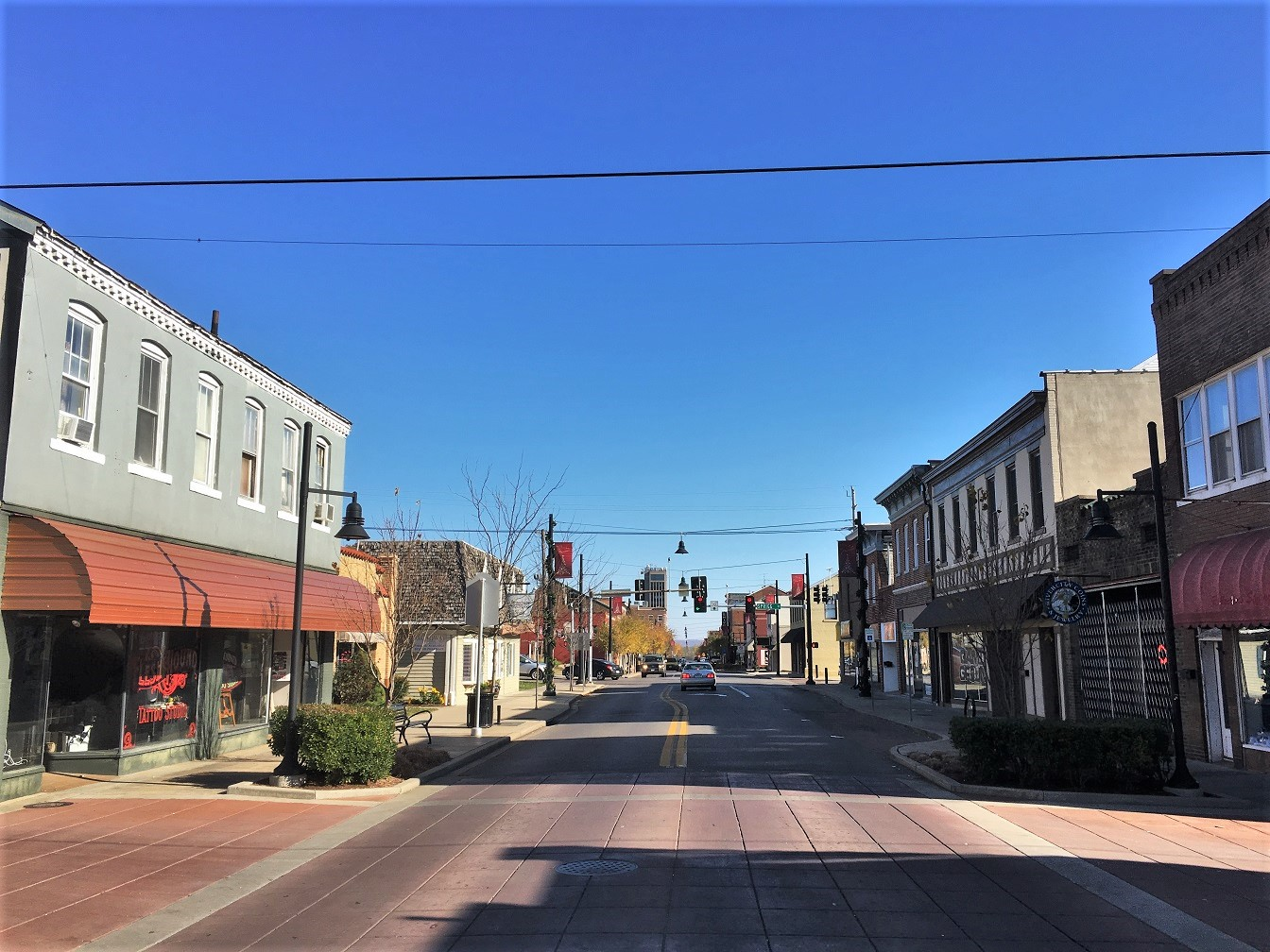

- Location within Missouri Location within the United States
- Location: 600, 700 & 800 blocks of Broadway & 210 N. Ellis St., Cape Girardeau, Missouri
- Coordinates: 37°18′24″N 89°31′39″W
- Area: 10.2 acres (4.1 ha)
- Built: 1848-1948
- Architect: Long, Harold W., et al.
- Architectural style: Queen Anne, Mission Revival, Art Deco
- NRHP reference No.: 15001017
- Added to NRHP: September 6, 2016

Broadway Commercial Historic District is a national historic district located at Cape Girardeau, Cape Girardeau County, Missouri. The district encompasses 35 contributing buildings and 1 contributing structure in a predominantly commercial section of Cape Girardeau. It developed between about 1868 and 1965, and includes representative examples of Queen Anne, Mission Revival, and Art Deco style architecture. Located in the district is the separately listed Julius Vasterling Building, the Esquire Theater, and the Broadway Theater. Other notable buildings include the Star Service Station (1965), Phil C. Haman Drug Store (1927), Haman's Shoe Store (1910), Finney's Drug Store (c. 1906), Broadway Prescription Shop (c. 1930), Kroger Super Market (1948), Kroger Super Market Parking Lot (1948), Pete Koch's Sinclair Service Station (1954-1955), Bell Telephone Company (1963), American Legion Building (1920-1923), and Vandeven Mercantile (c. 1879).

It was listed on the National Register of Historic Places in 2016.
