= Frederick W. and Mary Karau Pott House =

Historic house in Missouri, United States

- U.S. National Register of Historic Places
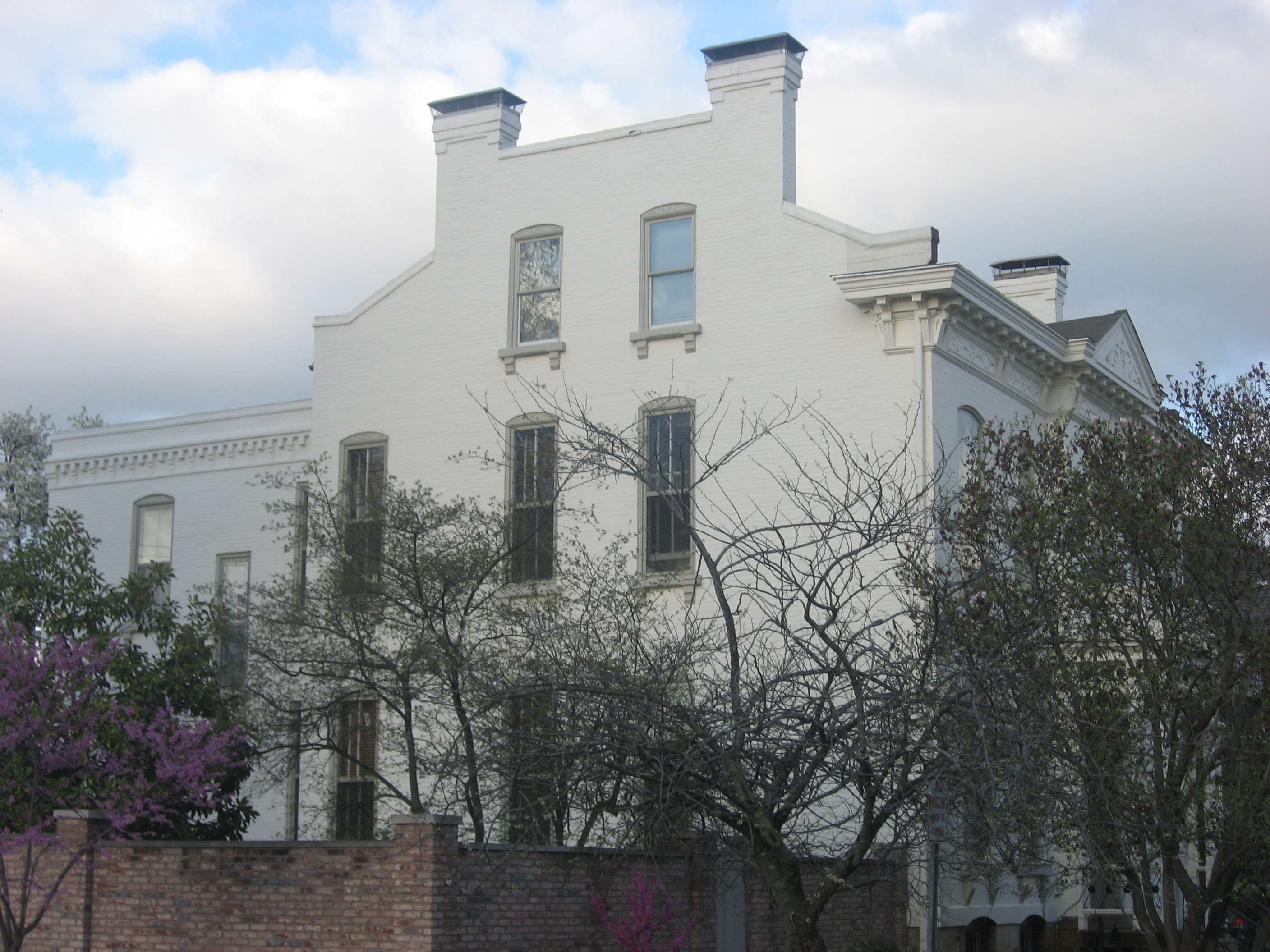
- Frederick W. and Mary Karau Pott House, April 2013

- Location within Missouri Location within the United States
- Location: 826 Themis St., Cape Girardeau, Missouri
- Coordinates: 37°18′28″N 89°31′46″W
- Area: less than one acre
- Built: c. 1885
- Architectural style: Late Victorian
- NRHP reference No.: 99000745
- Added to NRHP: June 25, 1999

Frederick W. and Mary Karau Pott House is a historic home located at Cape Girardeau, Missouri. It was built about 1885, and is a 2 1/2-story, Italianate style brick dwelling. It has a side-gabled roof, a projecting pedimented front gable and parapet chimneys. It features an overhanging eave with curvilinear brackets and modillions, tall narrow windows with round and segmental arches, and an ornate central portico supported by groups of chamfered columns.

It was listed on the National Register of Historic Places in 1999.
