= Esquire Theater (Cape Girardeau, Missouri) =

- U.S. National Register of Historic Places
- U.S. Historic district – Contributing property
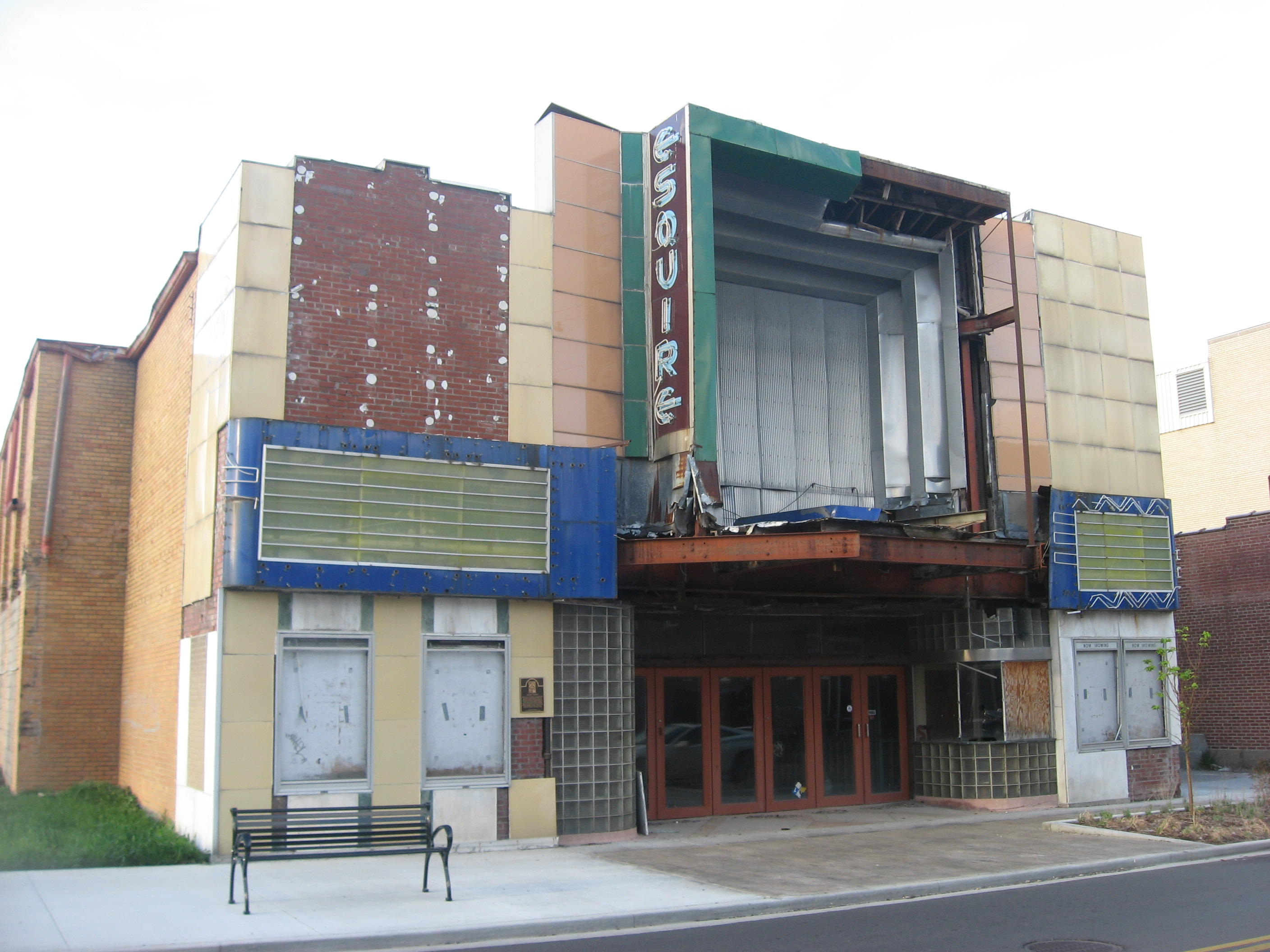
- Esquire Theater, April 2013

- Location within Missouri Location within the United States
- Location: 824 Broadway, Cape Girardeau, Missouri
- Coordinates: 37°18′32″N 89°31′44″W
- Area: less than one acre
- Built: 1946-1947
- Architect: Roth, Harold; Wooner, Bernard
- Architectural style: Art Deco
- MPS: Cape Girardeau, Missouri MPS
- NRHP reference No.: 05001025
- Added to NRHP: September 15, 2005

Esquire Theater is a historic movie theater located at Cape Girardeau, Missouri, United States. It was built in 1946–1947, and is a two-story, brick building with a colorful Art Deco facade. The building measures approximately 100 feet by 60 feet. It features a projecting marquee with neon tube lights; a streamlined, curving entrance and ticket booth; a projecting proscenium-like arch; and embellishments including enameled and stainless steel, structural pigmented glass, marble and glass blocks.

It was listed on the National Register of Historic Places in 2005. It is located in the Broadway Commercial Historic District.

In 2025, the previously vacant building was renovated into several commercial storefronts, and the facade was restored.
