= Dr. Jean Chapman House =

Historic house in Missouri, United States

- U.S. National Register of Historic Places
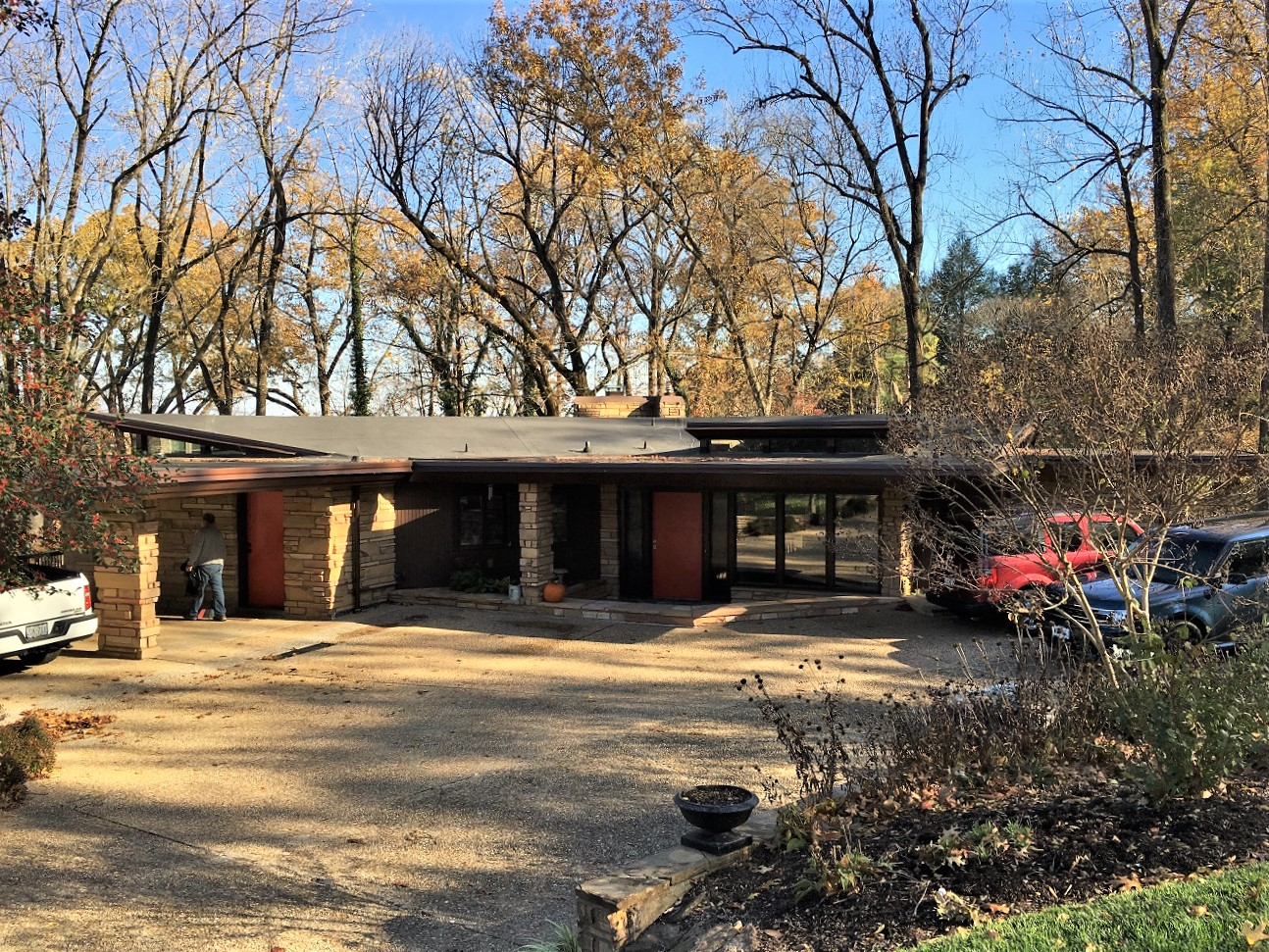

- Location within Missouri Location within the United States
- Location: 1150 N. Henderson Ave. Cape Girardeau, Missouri
- Coordinates: 37°19′12″N 89°31′57″W
- Area: Less than one acre
- Built: 1963
- Architect: Boardman, John E.
- Architectural style: Wrightian
- NRHP reference No.: 16000084
- Added to NRHP: March 15, 2016

Dr. Jean Chapman House is a historic home located at Cape Girardeau, Missouri. Designed by John L.E. Boardman and built in 1963, the home is a one-story, V-shaped dwelling with Wrightian style influences. It is built on a steeply sloped lot and is constructed almost entirely of local Ste. Genevieve limestone.

It was listed on the National Register of Historic Places in 2015.

As of 2025, it remains a private residence.
