= South Middle Street Historic District =

Historic district in Missouri, United States

- U.S. National Register of Historic Places
- U.S. Historic district
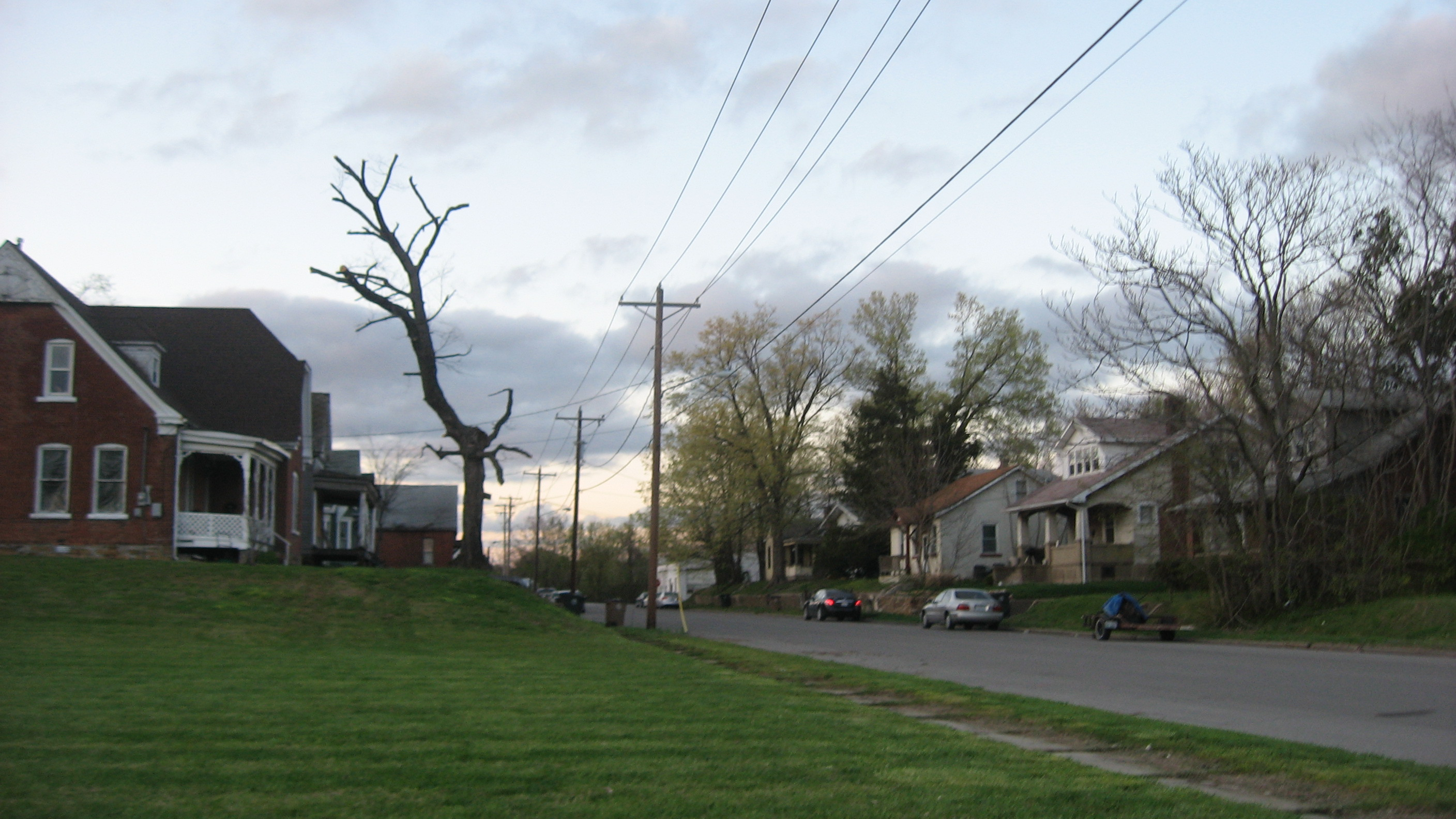
- South Middle Street in Cape Girardeau, April 2013

- Location within Missouri Location within the United States
- Location: 513 William St., 202-230 S. Middle St., and 203-229 S. Middle, Cape Girardeau, Missouri
- Coordinates: 37°18′00″N 89°31′29″W
- Area: 2.5 acres (1.0 ha)
- Architect: Ossenkopp, Henry C.; et al.
- Architectural style: Late Victorian, Bungalow/craftsman
- NRHP reference No.: 09000829
- Added to NRHP: October 14, 2009

South Middle Street Historic District is a national historic district located at Cape Girardeau, Cape Girardeau County, Missouri. The district encompasses 15 contributing buildings in an exclusively residential section of Cape Girardeau. It developed between about 1890 and 1931, and includes representative examples of Late Victorian and Bungalow / American Craftsman style architecture. The houses were constructed for working and middle class residents.

It was listed on the National Register of Historic Places in 2009.
