= Trail of Tears State Park =

State park in Missouri, United States

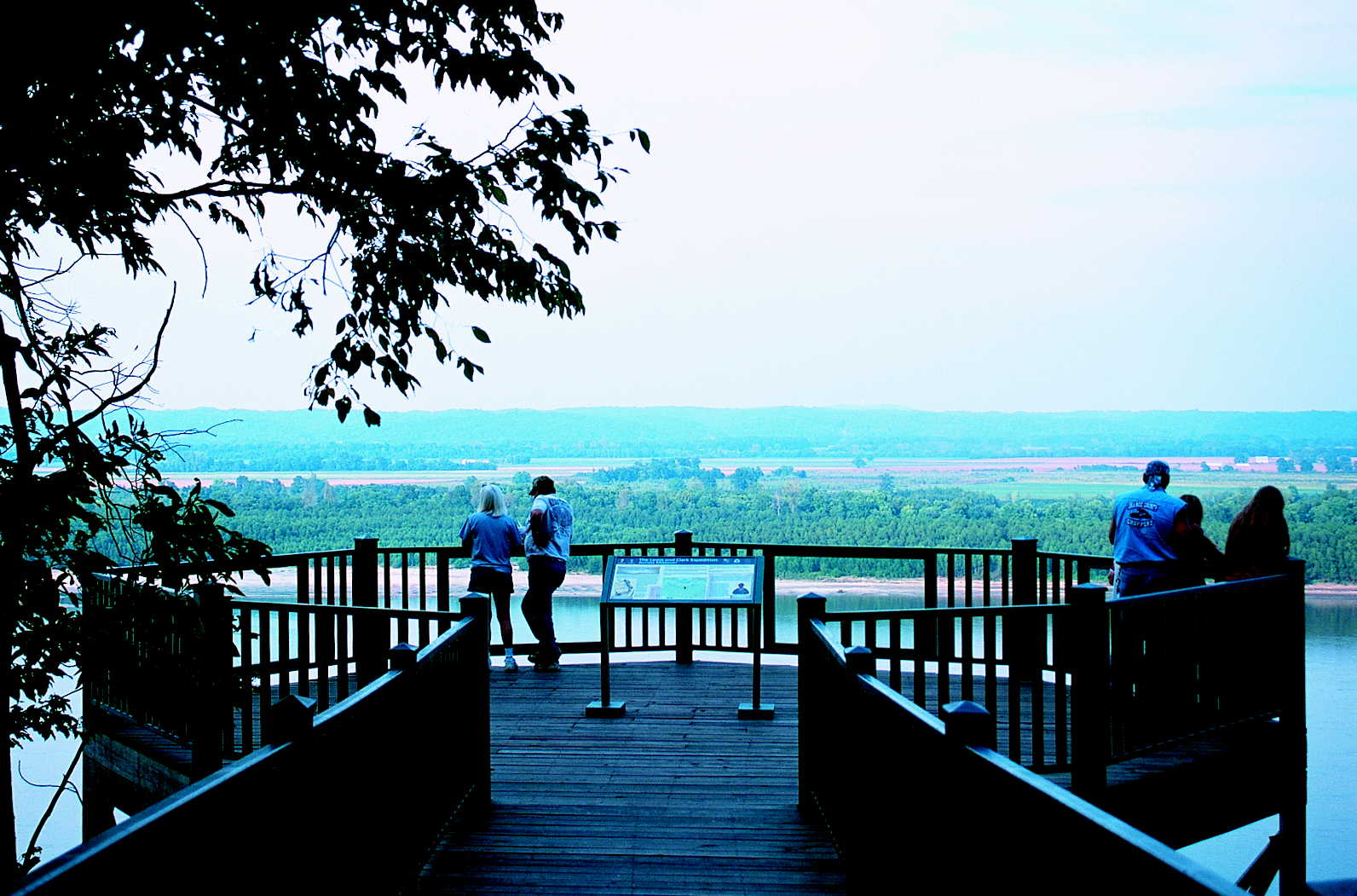
- Mississippi River overlook

- Location within Missouri Location within the United States
- Location: Cape Girardeau County, Missouri, United States
- Coordinates: 37°26′19″N 89°28′52″W
- Area: 3,415.39 acres (1,382.16 ha)
- Elevation: 486 ft (148 m)
- Established: 1957
- Administrator: Missouri Department of Natural Resources
- Visitors: 134,173 (in 2023)
- Website: Official website
- Trail of Tears State Park; Archaeological Site
- U.S. National Register of Historic Places
- Nearest city: Oriole, Missouri
- Area: 19.3 acres (7.8 ha)
- NRHP reference No.: 70000326
- Added to NRHP: December 2, 1970

Trail of Tears State Park is a public recreation area covering 3,415 acres (1,382 ha) bordering the Mississippi River in Cape Girardeau County, Missouri. The state park stands as a memorial to those Cherokee Native Americans who died on the Cherokee Trail of Tears. The park's interpretive center features exhibits about the Trail of Tears as well as displays and specimens of local wildlife. An archaeological site in the park was added to the National Register of Historic Places in 1970.

== Activities and amenities ==
Activities in the park include camping, picnicking, swimming, hiking, and horseback riding. Fishing is provided at 20-acre (8.1 ha) Lake Boutin and on the Mississippi River. A lookout offers a view of the river and Illinois on the opposite shore. The park has four trails: Peewah - 9 miles (14 km); Lake – 2.25 miles (3.62 km); Sheppard Point – 1.3 miles (2.1 km); and Nature – 0.6 miles (0.97 km).

== See also ==
- Cherokee Nation (19th century)
