= Louis J. Schultz School =

- Central High School
- U.S. National Register of Historic Places
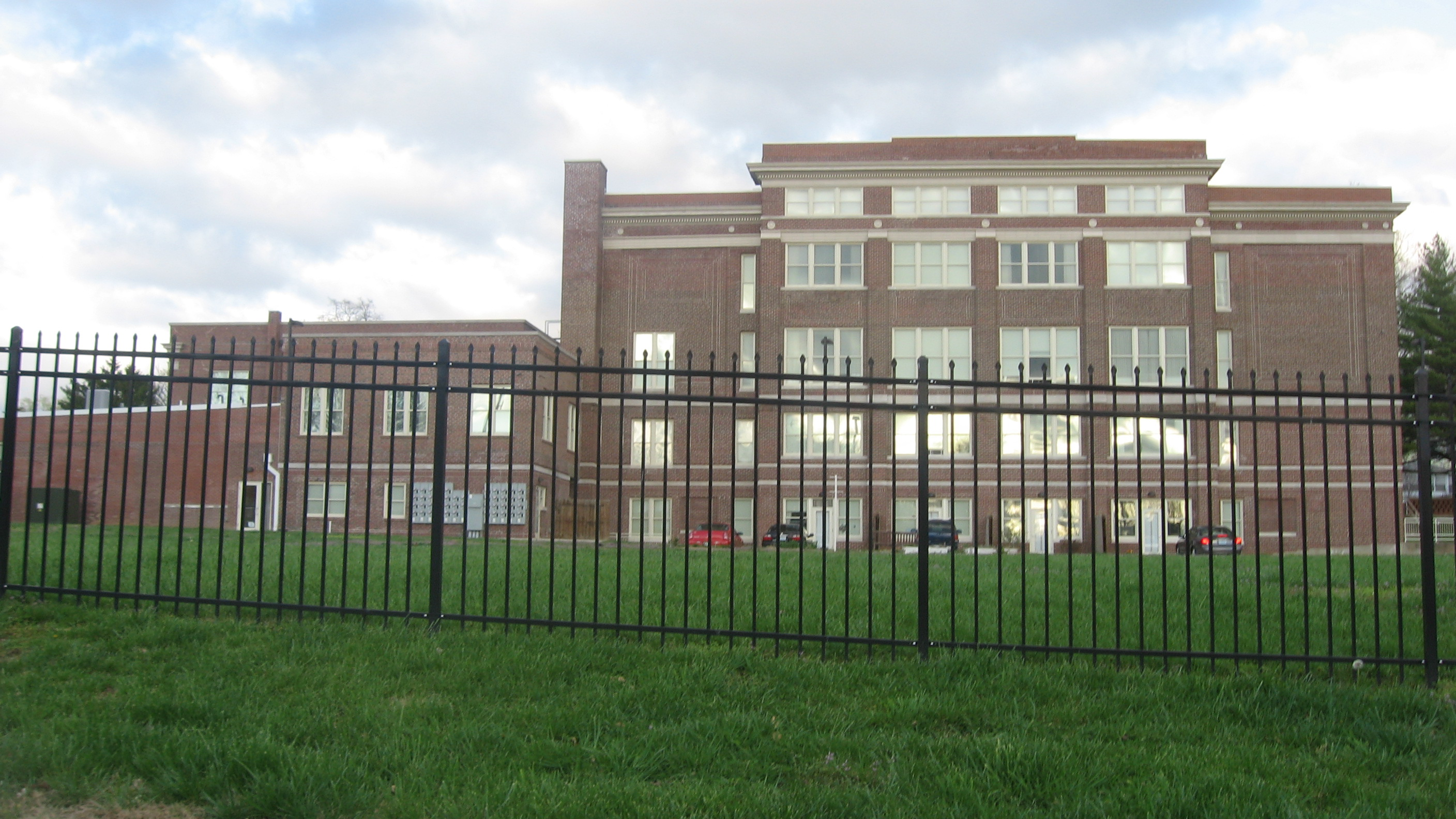
- Louis J. Schultz School, April 2013

- Location within Missouri Location within the United States
- Location: 101 S. Pacific St., Cape Girardeau, Missouri
- Coordinates: 37°18′18″N 89°31′49″W
- Area: 3.3 acres (1.3 ha)
- Built: 1915, 1919, 1942
- Architect: Foster, D.B.; et al.
- Architectural style: Renaissance
- NRHP reference No.: 08000663
- Added to NRHP: July 18, 2008

Louis J. Schultz School, originally known as Central High School, is a historic school building located at Cape Girardeau, Missouri, USA. The central section was built in 1915, and is a three-story (plus basement), flat roofed, red brick, concrete framed, Renaissance Revival style school building. Flanking two-story wings were finished in 1919 and a shop wing added in 1942. It features a glazed terra cotta cornice and limestone coursing.

It was listed on the National Register of Historic Places in 2008.
