= St. James A.M.E. Church (Cape Girardeau, Missouri) =

Historic church in Missouri, United States

- U.S. National Register of Historic Places
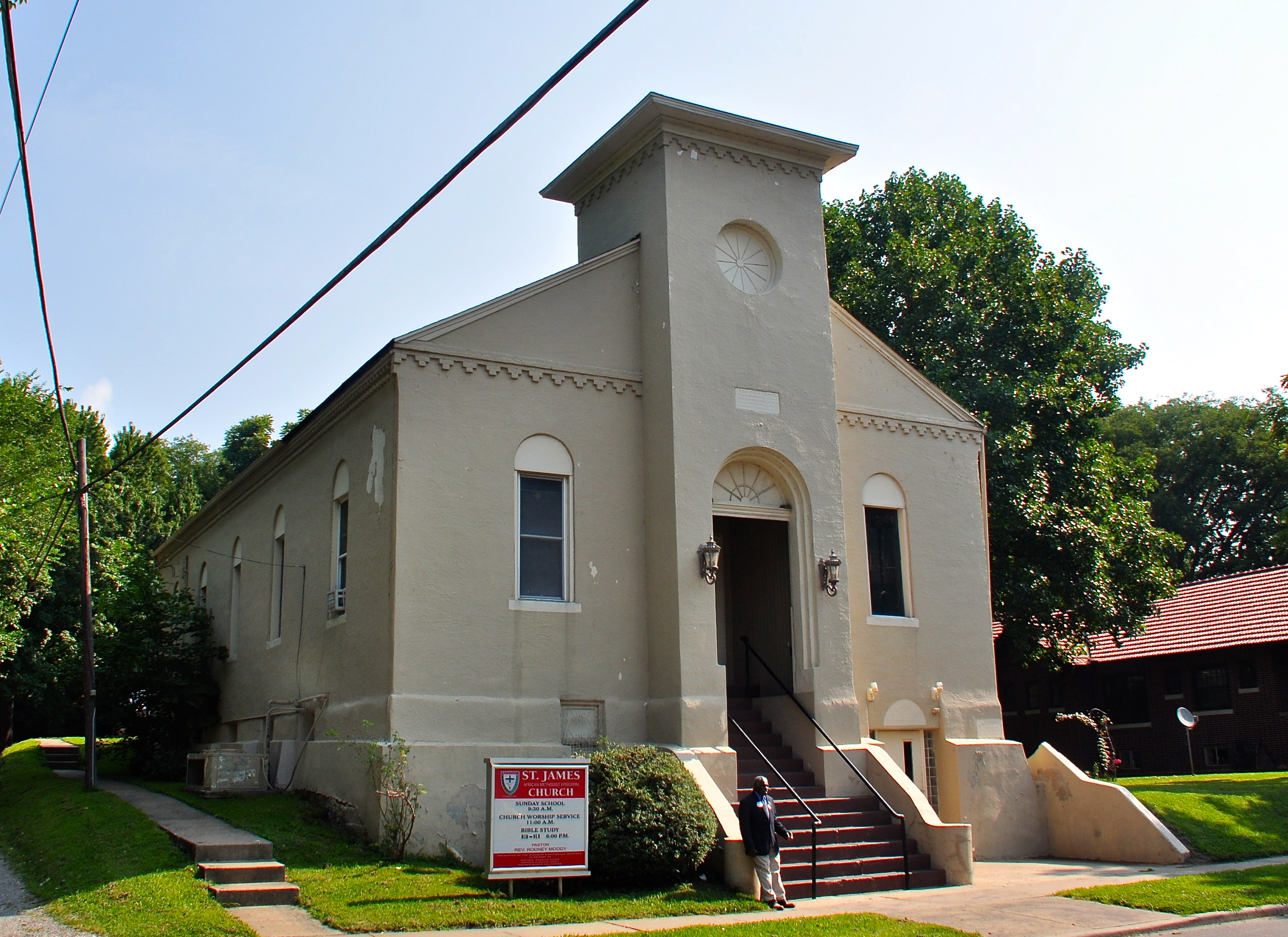
- St. James A.M.E. Church, July 2014

- Location within Missouri Location within the United States
- Location: 516 North St., Cape Girardeau, Missouri
- Coordinates: 37°18′34″N 89°31′26″W
- Area: Less than 1 acre (0.40 ha)
- Built: 1875, 1892
- Architectural style: center steeple church
- NRHP reference No.: 13001085
- Added to NRHP: January 15, 2014

St. James A.M.E. Church, also known as the St. James Chapel AME Church and St. James Chapel, is a historic African Methodist Episcopal congregation in Cape Girardeau, Missouri. It is noted for its historic church, a one-story, stucco-covered brick building with a rectangular plan and a front facing gable built in 1875.

The church features a central square tower added in 1892, with wide overhanging boxed eaves, a centered round window, and a pyramidal roof. It sits on a raised basement dug in 1926. It is one of two remaining urban African-American churches in Cape Girardeau constructed during the Reconstruction Era. It was listed on the National Register of Historic Places in 2014.
