= Edward S. and Mary Annatoile Albert Lilly House =

Historic house in Missouri, United States

- U.S. National Register of Historic Places
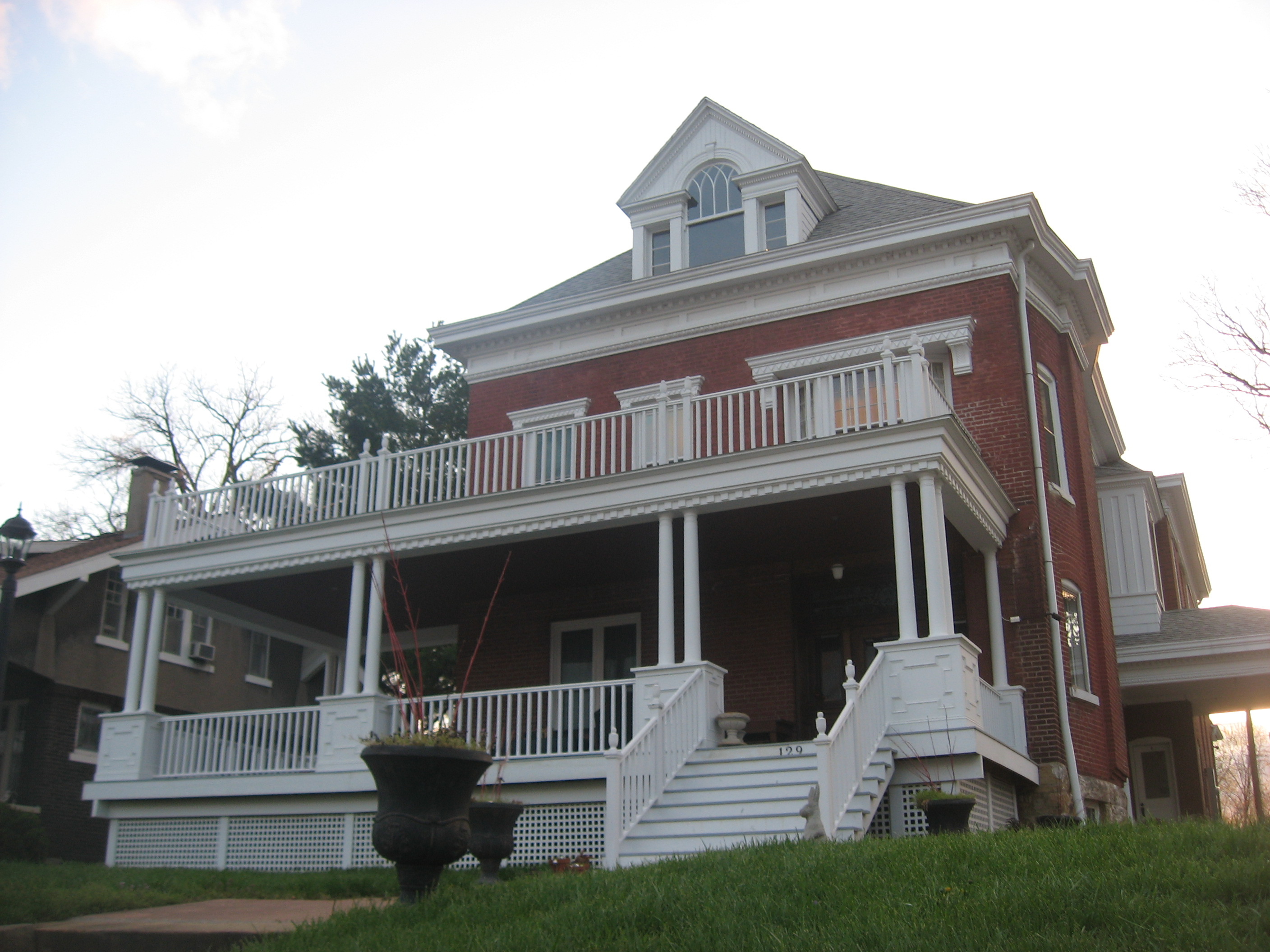
- Edward S. and Mary Annatoile Albert Lilly House, April 2013

- Location within Missouri Location within the United States
- Location: 129 S. Lorimier, Cape Girardeau, Missouri
- Coordinates: 37°18′6″N 89°31′18″W
- Area: less than one acre
- Built: 1897
- Built by: Ossenkop, Henry; Regenhardt, William
- Architectural style: Colonial Revival
- NRHP reference No.: 08000535
- Added to NRHP: June 20, 2008

Edward S. and Mary Annatoile Albert Lilly House is a historic home located at Cape Girardeau, Missouri. It was built in 1897, and is a 2 1/2-story, Colonial Revival style brick dwelling. It has a full-width wraparound front porch with classical columns and porte cochere. It features a medium pitched hipped roof with pediment dormers, ornate pressed metal cornice with dentils and pressed metal window hoods. Also on the property is a contributing 1 1/2-story brick carriage house.

It was listed on the National Register of Historic Places in 2008.
