= Wood Building =

- U.S. National Register of Historic Places
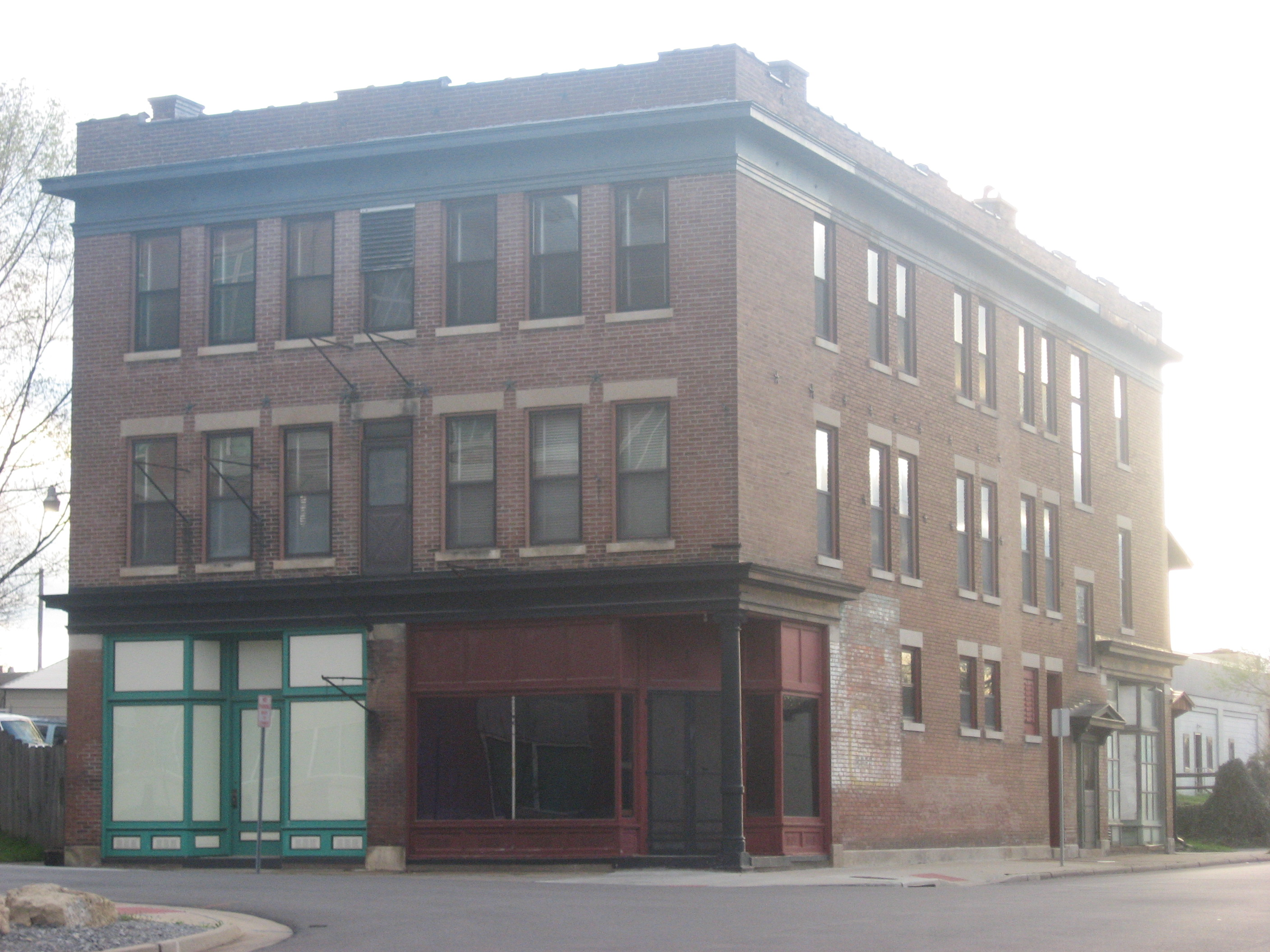
- Wood Building, April 2013

- Location within Missouri Location within the United States
- Location: 1-3 S. Frederick and 605-607 Independence Sts., Cape Girardeau, Missouri
- Coordinates: 37°18′21″N 89°31′33″W
- Area: less than one acre
- Built: c. 1908-1910
- Architectural style: Two-Part Commercial Block
- MPS: Cape Girardeau, Missouri MPS
- NRHP reference No.: 03001269
- Added to NRHP: December 10, 2003

Wood Building, also known as the Central Inn, Central Hotel, Central Tavern, Central Bar, Corner Inn, Corner Bar, Corner Pub, and Mac's Tavern, is a historic commercial building located at Cape Girardeau, Missouri. It built around the 1900’s, and is a rectangular, three-story, red brick, two-part commercial block building. It features an original, decorative sheet-metal cornice, a prominent parapet, and a cast-iron column at the recessed corner entrance.

It was listed on the National Register of Historic Places in 2003.
