= Abraham Russell Ponder House =

Historic house in Missouri, United States

- U.S. National Register of Historic Places
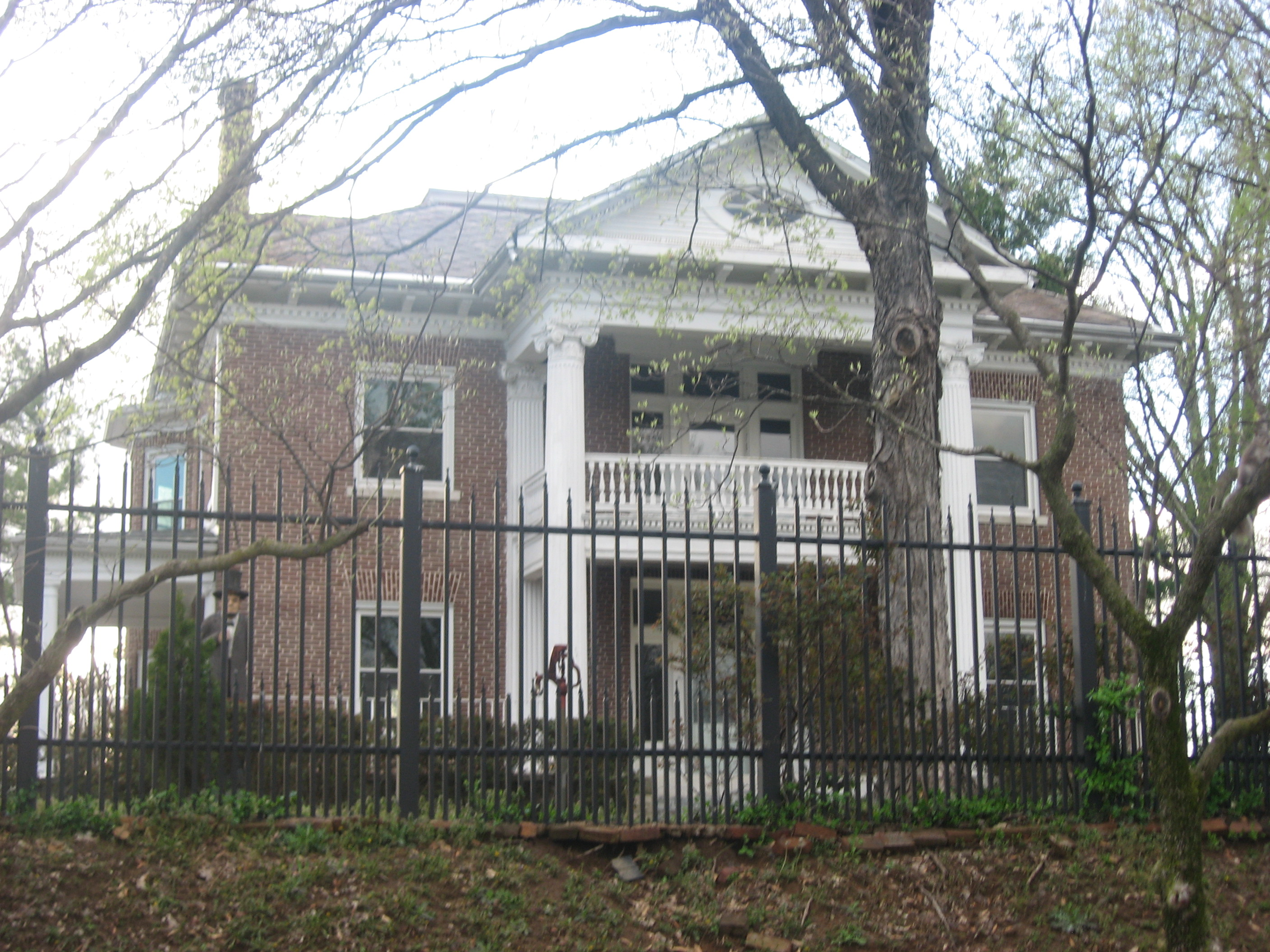
- Abraham Russell Ponder House, April 2013

- Location within Missouri Location within the United States
- Location: 141 S. Louisiana Ave., Cape Girardeau, Missouri
- Coordinates: 37°18′15″N 89°32′17″W
- Area: less than one acre
- Built: 1905
- Architect: Blackwood, Lewis Brinton
- Architectural style: Classical Revival
- NRHP reference No.: 08000226
- Added to NRHP: March 27, 2008

Abraham Russell Ponder House is a historic home located at Cape Girardeau, Missouri. It was built in 1905, and is a two-story, Classical Revival style brick dwelling. It has a hipped roof with a moderate overhang with decorative brackets and a wide frieze with dentil molding. It features a central two-story, double-tiered pedimented portico supported by full height fluted Ionic order columns and pilasters.

It was listed on the National Register of Historic Places in 2008.
