= J. Maple and Grace Senne Wilson House =

Historic house in Missouri, United States

- U.S. National Register of Historic Places
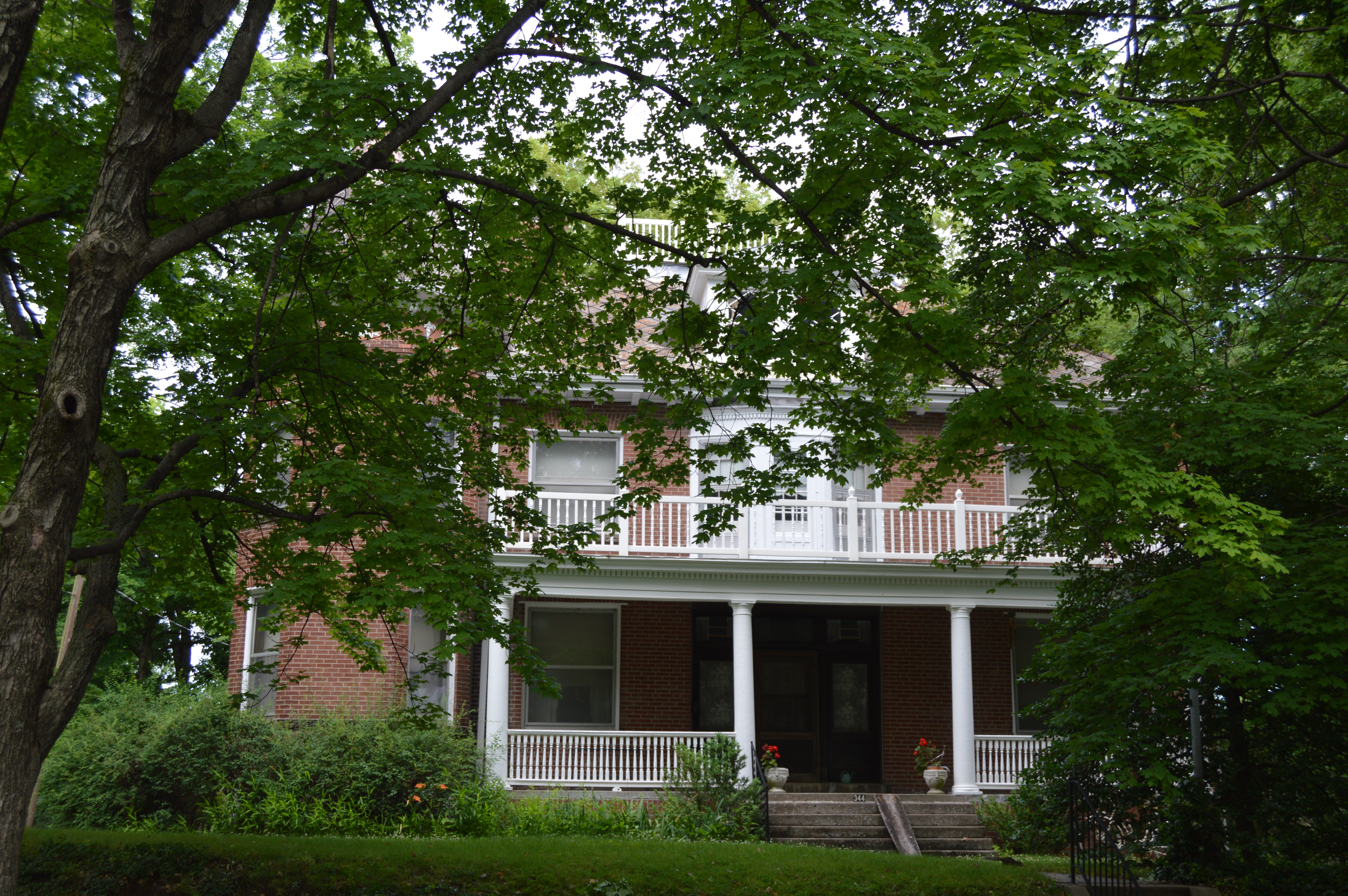
- J. Maple and Grace Senne Wilson House, June 2016

- Location within Missouri Location within the United States
- Location: 344 N. Ellis St., Cape Girardeau, Missouri
- Coordinates: 37°18′34″N 89°31′39″W
- Area: Less than one acre
- Built: 1903-1904
- Architect: Blackwood, Lewis Brinton
- Architectural style: Colonial Revival
- NRHP reference No.: 15000365
- Added to NRHP: July 7, 2015

J. Maple and Grace Senne Wilson House is a historic home located at Cape Girardeau, Missouri, US. It was built in 1903–1904, and is a 2 1/2-story, Colonial Revival style red brick dwelling. It has a hipped roof, a rooftop balustrade, and a central hipped dormer. It features a one-story full-width porch supported by Tuscan order columns and topped with a balustrade and two-story octagonal corner tower.

It was listed on the National Register of Historic Places in 2015.
