= Marquette Hotel (Cape Girardeau, Missouri) =

- U.S. National Register of Historic Places
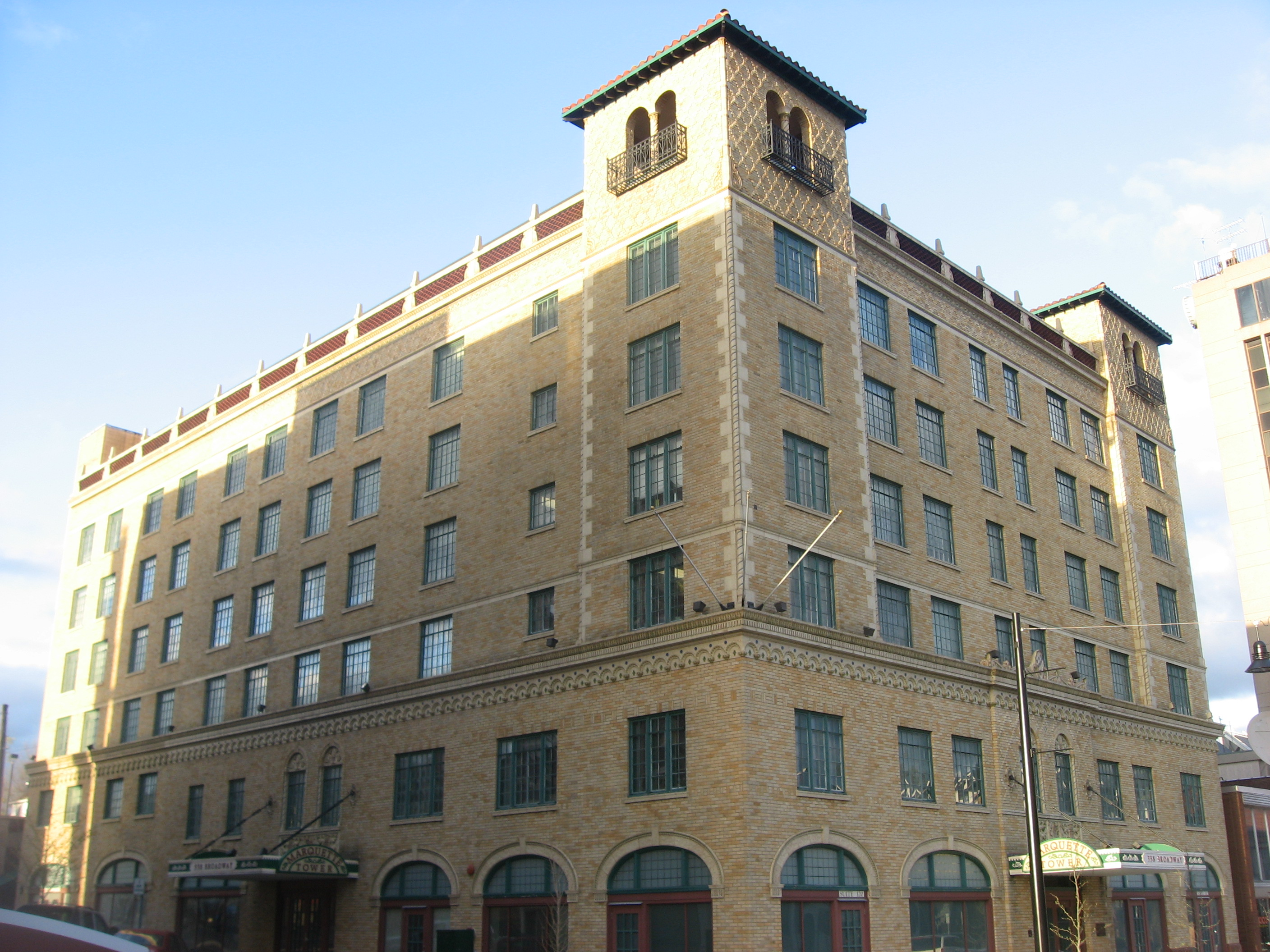
- Front and western side

- Location within Missouri Location within the United States
- Location: 338 Broadway St., Cape Girardeau, Missouri
- Coordinates: 37°18′30″N 89°31′19″W
- Built: 1928
- Architect: Manske, Walter P.; Bartling, George F.
- Architectural style: Mission/Spanish Revival
- NRHP reference No.: 02000356
- Added to NRHP: April 11, 2002

The Marquette Hotel is a historic former hotel structure located at 338 Broadway St. in Cape Girardeau, Missouri. The Mission/Spanish revival style building was designed by Walter P. Manske and George F. Bartling and built in 1928. The north wing was added in 1936. It is six stories high, includes a full basement, and has 115 guest rooms. It is constructed of reinforced concrete and brick with a flat concrete slab roof. It features twin Spanish-style towers that flank each side of the facade with hipped terra cotta tile roofs and double Romanesque arched openings separated by Moorish-style spiral columns.

It was added to the National Register of Historic Places in 2002.
