= Klostermann Block =

- U.S. National Register of Historic Places
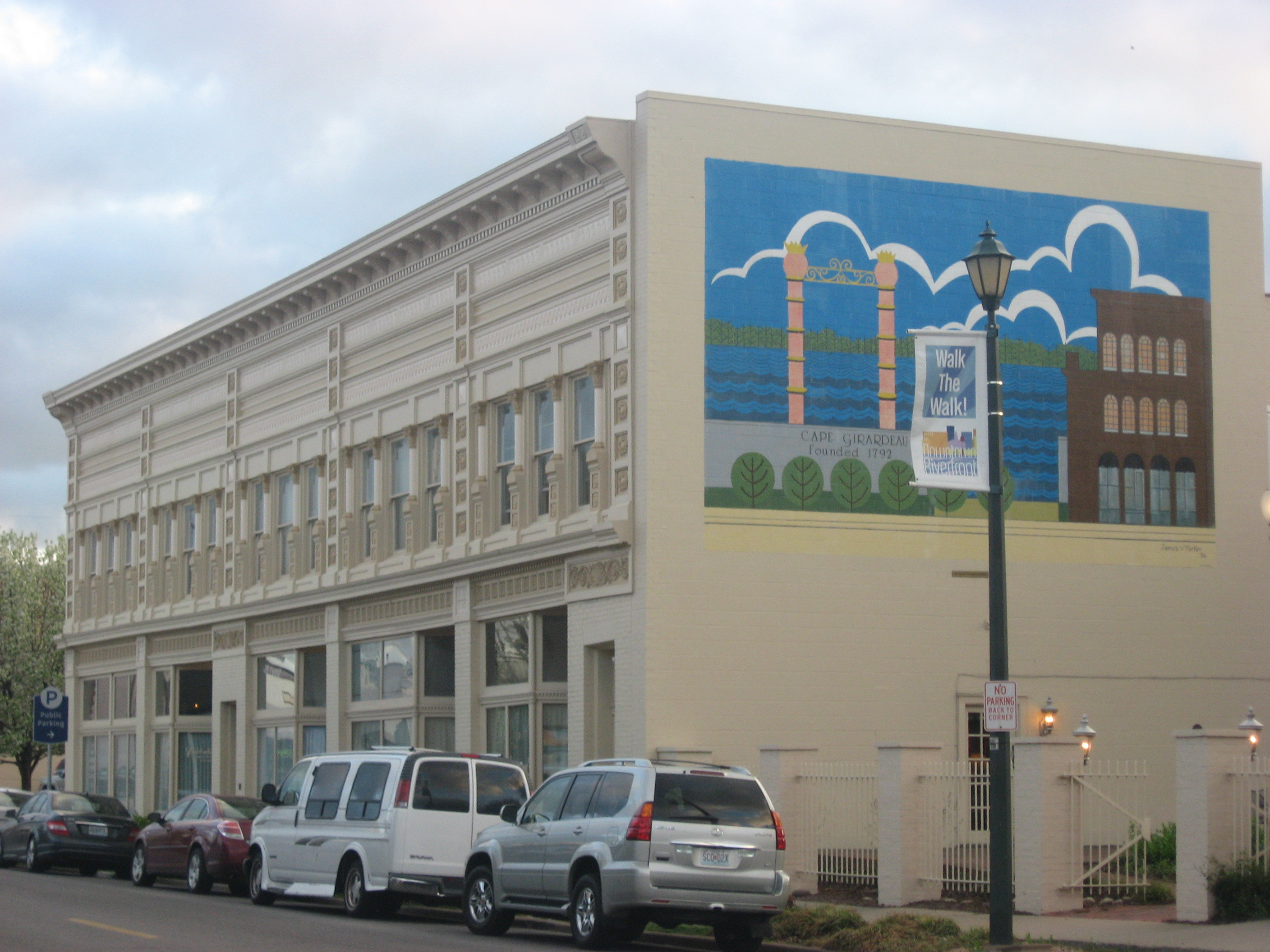
- Klostermann Block, April 2013

- Location within Missouri Location within the United States
- Location: 7, 9, 11, 13 and 15 S. Spanish St., Cape Girardeau, Missouri
- Coordinates: 37°18′11″N 89°31′12″W
- Area: less than one acre
- Built: 1905
- Architectural style: Late 19th And 20th Century Revivals
- NRHP reference No.: 94000739
- Added to NRHP: July 22, 1994

Klostermann Block, also known as the Alliance Building, is a historic commercial building located at Cape Girardeau, Missouri. It built in 1905, and is a two-story, rectangular brick, building measuring 100 feet by 75 feet. It features a cornice and frieze of pressed metal.

It was listed on the National Register of Historic Places in 1996.
