= Bainbridge Ferry =

- U.S. National Register of Historic Places
- Location within Missouri Location within the United States
- Location: County Road 630, Cape Girardeau, Missouri
- Coordinates: 37°24′43″N 89°26′16″W
- Area: 1.3 acres (0.53 ha)
- Built: 1837-1839
- MPS: Cherokee Trail of Tears MPS
- NRHP reference No.: 07000573
- Added to NRHP: June 21, 2007

Bainbridge Ferry, also known as the Randol's Ferry and Littleton's Ferry, is a historic ferry landing on the western shore of the Mississippi River at Cape Girardeau, Missouri. It is the site of a ferry that was established about 1805 and operated in the 19th century. The ferry was located at one of two places on the Mississippi River utilized by the Cherokee to cross from Illinois to Missouri on the Trail of Tears of 1837–1839.

It was listed on the National Register of Historic Places in 2007.
