= Cape Girardeau–Jackson metropolitan area =

Cape Girardeau–Sikeston, MO–IL Metropolitan Area
- Combined Statistical Area
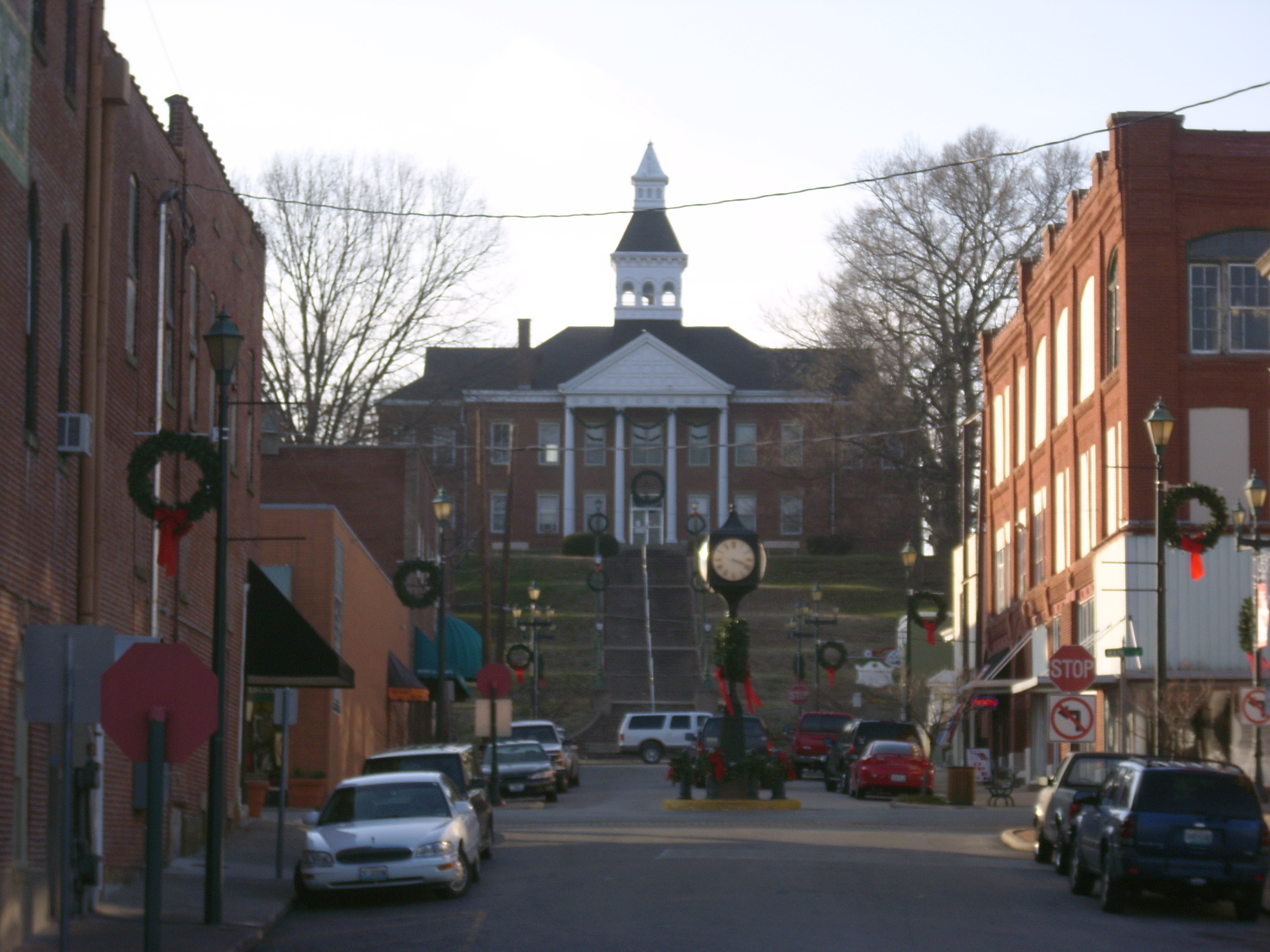
- Downtown Cape Girardeau
Cape Girardeau–Sikeston, MO–IL CSA
Cape Girardeau, MO–IL MSA
Sikeston, MO µSA
City of Cape Girardeau
- Country: United States
- State: Missouri; Illinois
- Largest city: Cape Girardeau, MO
- Other cities: Jackson, MO; Marble Hill, MO; Scott City, MO; Sikeston, MO; Cairo, IL

Population (2022)
  - MSA: 236,514
  - CSA: 308,851
- Time zone: UTC−6 (CST)
  - Summer (DST): UTC−5 (CDT)

The Cape Girardeau–Jackson Metropolitan Statistical Area, as defined by the United States Census Bureau, is an area consisting of two counties in southeastern Missouri and one in southern Illinois with its core in both states. Its largest cities are the cities of Cape Girardeau and Jackson. It was upgraded from a Micropolitan Statistical Area (μSA) to a Metropolitan Statistical Area (MSA) by the Office of Management and Budget on November 20, 2008.

As of the 2010 census, the MSA had a population of 96,275.

== Counties ==
- Cape Girardeau County, Missouri
- Bollinger County, Missouri
- Alexander County, Illinois

== Communities ==
=== Places with more than 30,000 inhabitants ===
- Cape Girardeau, Missouri (Principal city) Pop: 39,540

=== Places with 1,000 to 30,000 inhabitants ===
- Jackson, Missouri (Principal city) Pop: 15,481
- Scott City, Missouri (partial) Pop: 4,346
- Cairo, Illinois Pop: 1,733
- Marble Hill, Missouri Pop: 1,388

=== Places with 250 to 1,000 inhabitants ===
- Tamms, Illinois Pop: 430
- Delta, Missouri Pop: 376
- Thebes, Illinois Pop: 208
- McClure, Illinois Pop: 256
- Gordonville, Missouri Pop: 625
- East Cape Girardeau, Illinois Pop: 289

=== Places with fewer than 250 inhabitants ===
- Oak Ridge, Missouri Pop: 237
- Sedgewickville, Missouri Pop: 191
- Whitewater, Missouri Pop: 88
- Zalma, Missouri Pop: 73
- Allenville, Missouri Pop: 95
- Pocahontas, Missouri Pop: 97
- Dutchtown, Missouri Pop: 163
- Glen Allen, Missouri Pop: 57
- Old Appleton, Missouri Pop: 73

=== Unincorporated places ===
- Arab, Missouri
- Burfordville, Missouri
- Cache, Illinois
- Daisy, Missouri
- Egypt Mills, Missouri
- Elco, Illinois
- Fayville, Illinois
- Friedheim, Missouri
- Fruitland, Missouri
- Future City, Illinois
- Gale, Illinois
- Gipsy, Missouri
- Grassy, Missouri
- Klondike, Illinois
- Leopold, Missouri
- Miller City, Illinois
- Millersville, Missouri
- New Wells, Missouri
- Olive Branch, Illinois
- Oriole, Missouri
- Patton, Missouri
- Sturdivant, Missouri
- Urbandale, Illinois

== Townships ==
=== Cape Girardeau County ===
- Apple Creek
- Byrd
- Cape Girardeau
- Hubble
- Kinder
- Liberty
- Randol
- Shawnee
- Welch
- Whitewater

=== Bollinger County ===
- Crooked Creek
- Fillmore
- Liberty
- Lorance
- Scopus
- Union
- Wayne
- Whitewater

== Precincts ==
=== Alexander County ===
- Cache No. 1
- Cache No. 2
- Cairo
- Elco
- McClure
- Miller
- Olive Branch
- Sandusky
- Santa Fe
- Tamms
- Thebes
- Unity

== Demographics ==
As of the census of 2000, there were 90,312 people, 35,364 households, and 23,880 families residing within the μSA. The racial makeup of the μSA was 89.79% White, 7.75% African American, 0.40% Native American, 0.64% Asian, 0.02% Pacific Islander, 0.31% from other races, and 1.09% from two or more races. Hispanic or Latino of any race were 0.92% of the population.

The median income for a household in the μSA was $30,987, and the median income for a family was $37,694. Males had a median income of $29,194 versus $19,129 for females. The per capita income for the μSA was $16,106.

== Combined Statistical Area ==
The Cape Girardeau–Sikeston Combined Statistical Area is made up of three counties in southeastern Missouri and one county in southern Illinois. The statistical area includes one metropolitan area and micropolitan area. As of the 2000 Census, the CSA had a population of 134,051 (though a July 1, 2009 estimate placed the population at 134,567).

- Micropolitan Statistical Areas (μSAs)
  - Cape Girardeau (Cape Girardeau County, Missouri, Bollinger County, Missouri, and Alexander County, Illinois)
  - Sikeston (Scott County, Missouri, Mississippi County, Missouri and New Madrid County, Missouri)

== See also ==
- Missouri census statistical areas
