= Zalma, Missouri =

- Census-designated place
- Location of Zalma, Missouri
- Coordinates: 37°08′33″N 90°04′56″W
- Country: United States
- State: Missouri
- County: Bollinger

Area
  - Total: 0.21 sq mi (0.54 km^{2})
  - Land: 0.20 sq mi (0.53 km^{2})
  - Water: 0 sq mi (0.00 km^{2})
- Elevation: 394 ft (120 m)

Population (2020)
  - Total: 73
  - Density: 354/sq mi (136.5/km^{2})
- Time zone: UTC-6 (Central (CST))
  - Summer (DST): UTC-5 (CDT)
- ZIP code: 63787
- Area code: 573
- FIPS code: 29-81430
- GNIS feature ID: 2786553

Zalma, once known as "Bollinger's Mill", is an unincorporated community and census-designated place (CDP) on the banks of the winding Castor River at a point where the river makes a horseshoe bend in southern Bollinger County in southeast Missouri, United States. When the railroad moved to town, the name Bollinger's Mill was changed to Zalma, after railroad worker Zalma Block. Zalma is also said to come from a Native American word meaning "the end." As of the 2020 U.S. census, Zalma had a population of 73.

Zalma is part of the Cape Girardeau−Jackson, MO-IL Metropolitan Statistical Area. Zalma is home to a number of state parks that feature a number of activities such as deer hunting, fishing, bird watching, horseback riding, and hiking. Blue Pond, the deepest natural pond in the state of Missouri, is located outside of Zalma.

== History ==
In 1800, an Urban Asherbranner (or Asherbramer or Asherbrauner) settled on the upper portion of the Castor River, just where the river empties its waters into Mingo Bottom, and where the village of Zalma is now situated, built a log and brush dam and erected a water mill to grind corn. Philip Bollinger settled nearby.

In A History of Missouri (1908), Louis Houck states that the head rights to this mill were owned by Asherbranner himself, but were held instead by Philip Bollinger, a relative of Asherbranner's wife, Barbara. Philip Bollinger was a relative of Major George Frederick Bollinger, who settled on Whitewater and founded Burfordville in Cape Girardeau County.

The mill was later transferred to the Davault Bollinger line. Davault's third son, Daniel, succeeded his father as miller. Daniel is thought to have come to Zalma about mid-century (1850) to assume operation of the mill. His sister, Catherine (Kate), came with him. They repaired the log and brush dam and operated the mill until the Civil War. Daniel died about this time and his wife, Eleanora, operated the mill with hired help. This mill burned sometime between 1863 and 1873 perhaps by Southern sympathizers, but actual cause of the fire cannot be authenticated.

Zalma received its first post office in November 1876.

W.A. acquired the property and built a new mill house and a new dam. He put in machinery to grind wheat and corn, as well as a carding mill to card and wash wool.

According to the Marble Hill Press (Oct. 28, 1897), the McMinn Mill burned in 1897. The dam remained intact for several years after the mill burned, before it suffered the same fate.

On Dec. 21, 1880, Louis Houck completed a railroad between Cape Girardeau and Delta. A spur line eventually connected Zalma to the railroad. Sometime in the early 1930s the railroad was abandoned and removed.

The town's economy remained sluggish until the timber industry moved in. The Brown Cooperage Company bought thousands of acres of timber, mostly white oak, for $1 per acre. In 1884, the Bell Messler Company placed a factory at Zalma to cut veneer and box laths. The Zalma factory was located just upstream from the mill dam. This factory provided work for women who stacked the box laths in long rows in the sun for drying. A second box factory was located on the north side of Green Street near the Railroad Street intersection, a short distance west of the present Highway 51.

== Historical communities near Zalma ==
Zalma is bounded in all directions by a number of smaller, unincorporated communities.

- Arab, located at the intersection of State Highway 51, Route C and Route P, lies about four miles (6.4 km) south of Zalma
- April Hills is located approximately four miles on Bollinger County Road 710.
- Buchanan, is located on Route Y south of State Highway 51, lies about four miles (6.4 km) northwest of Zalma near Castor River.
- Castor Bridge is located on Castor River near the end of Bollinger County Road 615 southeast of Zalma.
- Dongola, is located on State Highway 51 just west of the State Highway 91 intersection, lies about seven miles (11 km) east of Zalma.
- Gipsy, is a hamlet located west of Zalma about three miles (4.8 km) on Supplemental Route E.
- Greenbrier, is located at the end of Route W northeast of Arab.
- Hahn, previously known as North Zalma, is a small community located on Route H just south of the Route FF intersection about halfway between Zalma and Marble Hill.
- Richardson, is located at the end of Bollinger County Road 644 along the Diversion Channel.
- Sank is located on Bollinger County Road 528 just north of State Highway 51 about four miles (6.4 km) east of Zalma.
- Schlatitz is located on State Highway 51 about five miles (8.0 km) east of Zalma.
- Sturdivant, is located on Route V near the Stoddard County line.

== Education ==
The Zalma R-V School District runs throughout much of southern Bollinger County. With an average yearly enrollment of 250 students in K-12, the school is one of the smallest public schools in Southeast Missouri. The school's mascot is the bulldog, and its colors are green and gold.

Activities at the school consist of FCCLA (Family, Career & Community Leaders of America), formerly known as FHA (Future Homemakers of America); Student Council; Junior and Senior Beta Club; Pep Club; Fellowship of Christian Athletes (FCA); Future Business Leaders of America (FBLA); Speech Team; Smokebusters; and the ZHS Concert Choir. Athletics at ZHS consist of boys' basketball, girls' volleyball, boys' baseball, girls' softball, and co-ed cheerleading, cross country, and track and field.

The Zalma Bulldogs varsity boys' basketball team won the Class 1A state basketball championship in 1939–1940. The Zalma Lady Bulldogs varsity volleyball team won the Class 1A state volleyball championship in 1990–1991. They advanced to the state tournament again in 1991-1992 and 1992-1993 but lost in the championship match each year to New Haven.

For adults aged 25 and older in Zalma, 72.9% possess a high school diploma as their highest educational attainment, 22.8% have less than high school and 4.3% possess a bachelor's degree or higher educational degree. None of the population possesses a post-graduate or professional degree.

== Geography ==
Zalma is located in southwest Bollinger County on Missouri Route 51. The Castor River flows past the north side of the community. Marble Hill is approximately 11 miles to the northeast, Gipsy is about 5.5 miles to the west and Arab is three miles to the south.

According to the United States Census Bureau, the village has a total area of 0.19 square miles (0.49 km^{2}), of which, 0.18 square miles (0.47 km^{2}) of it is land and 0.01 square miles (0.03 km^{2}) is water.

== Demographics ==
Historical population
Census	Pop.	Note	%±
1910	197		—
1920	259		31.5%
1930	204		−21.2%
1940	169		−17.2%
1950	137		−18.9%
1960	141		2.9%
1970	118		−16.3%
1980	121		2.5%
1990	83		−31.4%
2000	93		12.0%
2010	122		31.2%
2020	73		−40.2%
U.S. Decennial Census

=== 2000 census ===
As of the census of 2000, there were 93 people, 38 households, and 27 families residing in the village. The population density was 645.6 inhabitants per square mile (249.3/km^{2}). There were 54 housing units at an average density of 374.9 per square mile (144.7/km^{2}). The racial makeup of the village was 93.55% White, 2.15% Native American, and 4.30% from two or more races. The major ancestry groups in Zalma were 27% Irish, 22% German, 14% French Canadian, 8% Norwegian, 2% Cherokee, and 2% specified Native American tribes.

There were 38 households, out of which 36.8% had children under the age of 18 living with them, 42.1% were married couples living together, 26.3% had a female householder with no husband present, and 28.9% were non-families. 26.3% of all households were made up of individuals, and 7.9% had someone living alone who was 65 years of age or older. The average household size was 2.45 and the average family size was 2.85.

For people in the village aged 15 and over, 45.9% were married, 24.7% were divorced, 18.8% were single, never married, 10.6% were widowed, and none of the population was separated.

In the village, the population was spread out, with 28.0% under the age of 18, 8.6% from 18 to 24, 21.5% from 25 to 44, 32.3% from 45 to 64, and 9.7% who were 65 years of age or older. The median age was 37 years. For every 100 females, there were 66.1 males. For every 100 females age 18 and over, there were 67.5 males.

At the time of the 2000 U.S. Census, the median income for a household in the village was $21,250, and the median income for a family was $21,500. Estimates after 2007, however, showed the median income for a household in the village to be $26,907 and the median income for a family to be $26,146. Males had a median income of $27,917 versus $16,250 for females. The per capita income for the village was $10,842. There were 32.4% of families and 35.7% of the population living below the poverty line, including 53.3% of under eighteens and 18.2% of those over 64.

== Transportation ==
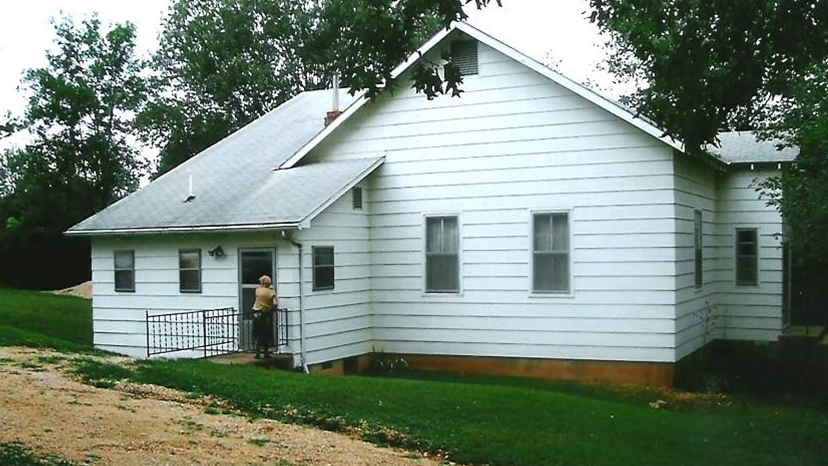
The building owned by Zalma Missionary Baptist Church, the first Baptist church in Zalma.

State Highway 51 runs directly through Zalma. The closest four-lane highway is 40 miles (64 km) east in Cape Girardeau, as is Interstate 55. The nearest airport is Twin City Airpark in Marble Hill.

== Churches ==
There are two churches in Zalma. The oldest of the two is the Zalma Missionary Baptist Church, which is affiliated with the Baptist Missionary Association of America. The larger of the two is the Zalma General Baptist Church, which is located on an adjacent property that was once owned by Methodists.
