= Lorance Township, Bollinger County, Missouri =

Lorance Township
- Township
- Coordinates: 37°17′54″N 089°58′55″W
- Country: United States
- State: Missouri
- County: Bollinger

Area
  - Total: 104.05 sq mi (269.48 km^{2})
  - Land: 103.9 sq mi (269.1 km^{2})
  - Water: 0.14 sq mi (0.37 km^{2}) 0.14%
- Elevation: 466 ft (142 m)

Population (2010)
  - Total: 4,366
  - Density: 174.9/sq mi (67.53/km^{2})
- FIPS code: 29-44084
- GNIS feature ID: 0766324

Lorance Township is one of eight townships in Bollinger County, Missouri, USA. As of the 2000 U.S. census, its population was 4,406. As of the 2010 U.S. census, the population had decreased to 4,366. Lorance Township covers 104.5 square miles (271 km^{2}).

Lorance Township was established in 1827, and named in honor of John Lorance, a pioneer citizen.

== Demographics ==
As of the 2010 U.S. census, there were 4,366 people living in the township. The population density was 41.96 inhabitants per square mile (16.20/km^{2}). There were 1,983 housing units in the township. The racial makeup of the township was 97.50% White, 0.07% Black or African American, 0.62% Native American, 0.37% Asian, 0.25% from other races, and 1.19% from two or more races. Approximately 1.01% of the population were Hispanic or Latino of any race.

== Geography ==
=== Incorporated areas ===
The township contains two incorporated settlements: Glen Allen and Marble Hill.

=== Unincorporated areas ===
The township contains the unincorporated areas and historical communities of Laflin and Leopold.

=== Cemeteries ===
The township contains the following 17 cemeteries: Bailey, Baker, Barks, Buehler, County Memorial Park, Crader, Deck, Dry Creek, Eaker, Ebenezer, Hahn, Lessley, Myers, Perkins, Saint Johns, Shell, and Shelton.

=== Streams ===
The streams of Bear Branch, Cedar Branch, Chicken Branch, Dockins Branch, Dillard Creek, Drunken Creek, Farmer Branch, Gimlet Creek, Granny Creek, Hog Creek, Hurricane Creek, Limbaugh Branch, Little Blue Branch, Little Crooked Creek, Little Dry Creek, Opossum Creek, Sunny Brook, and Turkey Branch flow through Lorance Township. Other bodies of water located in the township include Bollinger Lake, Lake of the Hills, Lukefahr Lake, Marquis Lake, and Reed Lake.

=== Landmarks ===
- Grassy Tower
- Grassy Tower Site State Public Hunting Area
- Pellegrino Park

== Transportation ==
Lorance Township contains one airport or landing strip: Twin City Airpark in Marble Hill.

== Administrative districts ==
=== School districts ===
- Leopold R-III School District
- Woodland R-IV School District

=== Political Districts ===
- Missouri's 8th Congressional District
- State House District 145
- State Senate District 27
