= Drunken Creek =

Stream in the American state of Missouri

Drunken Creek is a stream in eastern Bollinger County in the U.S. state of Missouri. It is a tributary of Hog Creek.

The stream headwaters arise adjacent to Missouri Route B about three miles northeast of Marble Hill. The stream flows south to south-southeast and crosses under Missouri Route 34 east of Marble Hill then turns southeast passing under Route U to its confluence with Hog Creek about 1.5 miles north of Laflin. The source area is at 37°20′42″N 89°55′50″W and the confluence is at 37°18′00″N 89°53′08″W.

Drunken Creek most likely was so named on account of frequent flash flooding, although folk etymology maintains the creek was named for an incident when a man drowned in the creek while drunk.

== See also ==
- List of rivers of Missouri
