= Malone Creek =

Stream in the U.S. state of Missouri

Coordinates: 37°09′45″N 89°53′34″W

Malone Creek is a stream in southern Bollinger County in the U.S. state of Missouri. The stream is a tributary of the Castor River within the Castor River Diversion Channel.

The stream headwaters arise approximately one mile west of Leopold and the stream flows generally to the southeast. The stream passes between the communities of Glennon and Drum as it enters the flat land along the Castor River.

Malone Creek bears the name of a local family.

== See also ==
- List of rivers of Missouri
