= Leopold, Missouri =

- Unincorporated community
- Nicknames: Vinemount (archaic), The Big Pold
- Motto: the sunshine state
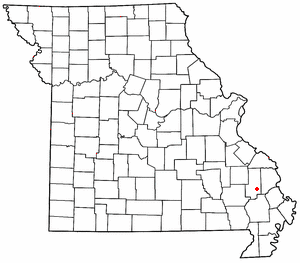
- Location of Leopold, Missouri
- Coordinates: 37°15′27″N 89°55′34″W
- Country: United States
- State: Missouri
- County: Bollinger

Area
  - Total: 0.077 sq mi (0.2 km^{2})
  - Land: 0.077 sq mi (0.2 km^{2})
  - Water: 0 sq mi (0.0 km^{2})
- Elevation: 627 ft (191 m)

Population (2000)
  - Total: 65
  - Density: 646/sq mi (249.3/km^{2})
- Time zone: UTC-6 (Central (CST))
  - Summer (DST): UTC-5 (CDT)
- ZIP code: 63760
- Area code: 573
- FIPS code: 29-81430

Leopold is an unincorporated community in eastern Bollinger County in Southeast Missouri, United States. It is located on Missouri Route N, approximately four miles southeast of Marble Hill. The community consists of roughly 65 residents and has one of the smallest public school districts in the state of Missouri.

Leopold is part of the Cape Girardeau–Jackson, MO-IL Metropolitan Statistical Area.

== History of Leopold ==
In 1856, Reverend John van Luytelaar established Vinemount, Missouri. Rev. John and 12 other families went looking for farm land. Among the families who made the trip included Clement Beel, John Debrock, Herman Elfrink, Jacob Holweg, Arnold Jansen, F. Meyer, A. Rickhoff, John Scharenborg, J. G. Sonderen, J.W. Tuling, and Wm. Wardracker. Wm. Wardracker was unable to make the pioneer life and left back for Cincinnati after two years of living here.

These families traveled down the Ohio River and up the Mississippi River by boat to Cape Girardeau and then found the community of Vinemount. Other families followed them and the community was starting to unfold.

In 1894 the first post office was built to serve the town of Vinemount. In the process of building the post office, they realized there was already a post office in Missouri by the name of Vinemount. This was when a name change was in order. The people then decided on the name of "Leopolis" (City of Leo), in honor of the Pope. This name was rejected and the present name, Leopold, was then proposed and accepted.

The first postmaster at Leopold was John Hahn. He would pick up the mail at church from Mr. Gerhard Luebbers and distribute it to the townspeople. When Elmer Nenninger became the postmaster in 1953, the post office was moved to its present location at the corner of Highway N and Main Street.

What was once known as Macke's Feed and General Store is now known as the Leopold Country Store. It has not been run by Gerard Macke for several years now. Edward Andrew Graham Jr. purchased the store from Mr. Macke in 2001. E.A. Graham Jr. then sold the store to Edgar Stoverink and it is now owned by Albert and Cindy Arnzen.

Among the businesses in Leopold is an automobile transmission service shop operated by Fred Beussink. Mr. Beussink had been associated for a number of years with a transmission service company in St. Louis until 1973 when he returned with his family to the Leopold area and built the modern three-bay service facility on a farm on Highway F, purchased from Herman Beussink. Years later, Fred Beussink moved his business into Leopold. This is now a transmission service and gas station entitled Beussink's Transmission Service and is currently owned and operated by Mike Vandeven.

The Leopold's St. Johns Cemetery Association was formed in 1952. This made it possible for church members to help take care of the graves of their relatives and loved ones.

On October 16, 1966, a group of Catholic men from the community met to organize a Council of the Knights of Columbus in Leopold. On September 26, 1967 the KCs purchased land from William Spooler. This is the property where the K of C Hall is now located. The Knights of Columbus Hall was built in 1968. A memorial shrine to Our Lady, Queen of Peace, was built under the supervision of William A. Landewee in 1973.

== Historical Communities Near Leopold ==
Leopold is bounded in all directions by a number of smaller, unincorporated communities that still retain historical significance.

• Clippard is a historical unincorporated area located somewhere northeast of Laflin, possibly near a county road crossing of Granny Creek. Some sources, however, place Clippard Post Office a few miles south of Laflin.

• Drum is an unincorporated area located just south of the Route T and Route F intersection east of Glennon. It was founded in 1893 by John W. Laird and is named for State Senator Robert Drum of Marble Hill. Students who live in and around Drum attend either Leopold R-3 School District or Delta R-5 School District, depending upon which side of the district line the student resides.

• Glennon is the unincorporated village located at the intersection of Route T and Route AB. It was named for Archbishop John Glennon who gave permission to establish a parish here on November 29, 1905. Students who live in Glennon attend Leopold R-3 School District.

• Laflin is the unincorporated area located at the end of Route U northeast of Leopold. There used to be a station here on the Belmont Branch Railroad. The Laflin Post Office was in existence from January 4, 1871 to April 15, 1954. The area is named after Sylvester M. Laflin, a former director of the St. Louis & Iron Mountain Railroad. Students who live in and around Laflin attend Leopold R-3 School District.

== Education ==
=== History of the Leopold R-III School District ===
Realizing the need for education, shortly after the first settlers arrived they formed the Society of St. Willibrord to make arrangements for having a school and to help finance it. The first school sessions were reportedly held in homes. One of the first school buildings was made out of logs and was located on or near the present farm of Lawrence Macke.

Only four to six months of public support were given when state aid for education became available to the early schools in Leopold. The people of the parish saw fit, by means of self-assessment, to pay the salary of the teacher for an additional three to four months each year.

Old records indicate that, beginning in 1889, a young lady from the community was hired each year to teach the children of the lower grades. The salary for these early “little” teachers began at $8.00 per month and rose as high as $15.00 per month.

=== The Leopold R-III School District ===
A small, rural school, the school district consists of one elementary and one consolidated junior-senior high school. According to the Missouri Department of Elementary and Secondary Education], there was a total of approximately 200 students and 30 certified staff members enrolled in the Leopold R-III School District during the 2009–2010 school year. The school colors are blue and white and its mascot is the wildcat. Activities at the school consist of Beta Club, Business Club, Science Fair Club, Student Activities Council, and the LHS Concert Choir. Athletics include boys' basketball, girls' volleyball, boys' baseball, girls' softball, and cheerleading.

Volleyball tends to bring the whole community out especially during competitive matches.

The Southeast Missourian newspaper, which circulates throughout much of the region, has named Leopold the best public school in the area for three years in a row from 2005 to 2008.

On May 6, 2008, Leopold R-III High School was awarded the Gold Star Award at a ceremony held in Jefferson City. Leopold was one of 15 schools in the state to receive this award based on the students performing in the top 10 percentile of all schools on the Missouri Assessment Program (MAP) tests and the school adequately meeting the yearly progress requirements.

== Religion ==
St. John's Catholic Church, located on Main Street in Leopold, was built in 1899. Work began in the spring and the church was built in pure Gothic style from native limestone found around and near the town. Parishioners of St. John's did most of the work on the church themselves. Since then, the church has undergone many interior changes.

In the fall of 2003, Bishop John Leibrecht announced that St. Anthony's Parish, located on Highway AB in Glennon, would be a mission parish of St. John's Catholic Church. St. Anthony's was formerly a mission of St. Joseph's Catholic Church in Advance. This seemed like a good idea because many of the residents of Leopold had, and to this day still have, relatives in Glennon. In addition, students who live in and around Glennon attend Leopold R-III School District.

St. Anthony's Catholic Church is the third oldest mission in the Roman Catholic Diocese of Springfield-Cape Girardeau. Located in the tiny village of Glennon, St. Anthony's was founded with a wooden framed church dedicated on February 3, 1906. That first church was destroyed by a tornado in 1917. It was replaced by another wooden framed church which burned in 1969. The present church building was dedicated in August 1970. Mass is held at St. Anthony's on Saturday evenings at 6:00 p.m. Directly behind the church is a hall in which social events such as wedding dances and church gatherings are held. Also, a small cemetery is located just up the road from the church.

St. John's and St. Anthony's are the only two Roman Catholic Church congregations in Bollinger County.

In May 1944, the Shrine of Our Lady Queen of Peace was dedicated to the members of the parish who were serving in the armed forces. Children of the community were asked to find the stones used to construct the shrine. After the shrine was built, evening Rosaries were said for those serving in the armed forces.
