= Granny Creek (Missouri) =

Stream in the U.S. state of Missouri

Granny Creek is a stream in Bollinger and Cape Girardeau counties in the U.S. state of Missouri. It is a tributary of Hog Creek.

The stream headwaters are in Cape Girardeau County about two miles southwest of Gravel Hill on Missouri Route 34 and just east of the county line. The stream flows south-southwest into Bollinger County and continues to the south roughly parallel to the county line. The confluence with Hog Creek is about 1.5 mile northwest of Lake Girardeau and the village of Crump. The source is at 37°20′34″N 89°51′45″W and the confluence is at 37°17′23″N 89°51′54″W.

The name "granny" is said to refer to a type of fish.

== See also ==
- List of rivers of Missouri
