= Castor, Missouri =

- unincorporated community
- Location of Bollinger County, Missouri
- Coordinates: 37°04′03″N 89°58′43″W
- Country: United States
- State: Missouri
- County: Bollinger
- Township: Filmore
- Elevation: 351 ft (107 m)
- Time zone: UTC-6 (Central (CST))
  - Summer (DST): UTC-5 (CDT)
- Area code: 573
- GNIS feature ID: 740278

Castor is an unincorporated community in the northwestern part of Filmore Township in Bollinger County, Missouri, United States. Castor is situated on the Castor River and is located approximately 16 miles west of Marble Hill.

== Name ==
The community of Castor was named for the Castor River. The Castor River was in turn named for the Greek word kastor, meaning beaver. The name was given by the French who came to the Mine La Motte district. The name was on account of the many beavers and their dams found along the river. Castor is located on the Castor River.

== History ==
A post office was operated in Castor between 1870–1914.
