= KCGK =

Radio station in Lewisville–Cape Girardeau, Missouri

- Lutesville, Missouri; United States
- Broadcast area: Cape Girardeau, Missouri; Marble Hill, Missouri
- Frequency: 104.1 MHz
- Branding: Positive Country 104.1

Programming
- Format: Christian country music

Ownership
- Owner: Pure Word Broadcasting, LLC

History
- First air date: August 4, 1995
- Former call signs: KQUA (1991–1995, CP); KMHM (1995–2021)
- Call sign meaning: Cape Girardeau Country

Technical information
- Licensing authority: FCC
- Facility ID: 26174
- Class: A
- ERP: 2,500 watts
- HAAT: 155 meters (509 ft)
- Transmitter coordinates: 37°22′40″N 89°56′05″W

Links
- Public license information: Public file; LMS
- Webcast: Listen live
- Website: positivecountry1041.com

KCGK (104.1 FM, "Positive Country 104.1") is a radio station licensed to Lutesville, Missouri, serving the areas of Cape Girardeau, Missouri and Marble Hill, Missouri. Owned by Pure Word Broadcasting, LLC, it broadcasts a Christian country music format.

On April 7, 2021, the station changed its call letters from KMHM to KCGK. On May 4, 2021, the station dropped its Southern gospel format in favor of a Christian country music format branded as Positive Country 104.1, featuring a mixture of secular and Christian country music.
