= Crooked Creek (Headwaters Diversion Channel tributary) =

Creek in Missouri, USA

Crooked Creek is a stream in Bollinger and Cape Girardeau counties of southeast Missouri. It is a tributary to the Headwater Diversion Channel.

The stream headwaters arise in Bollinger County at the confluence of Henson Branch and Reagan Branch at 37°29′02″N 89°50′10″W and an elevation of approximately 790 feet. The stream flows south passing under Missouri Route A one mile west of Tallent. It meanders southward passing the communities of Grisham, Bessville and Glenallen where it turns eastward paralleling Missouri Route 34 passing under Missouri Route 51 between Marble Hill and Lutesville. The stream flows past the community of Laflin, enters Cape Girardeau County and turns south as it passes the Lake Girardeau Conservation Area. It passes under Missouri Route U and enters the Diversion Channel two miles southwest of Whitewater at 37°13′00″N 89°50′10″W and an elevation of approximately 350 feet.

The stream was named due to its crooked course. The stream originally was a tributary to the Whitewater River prior to the creation of the Diversion Channel. The name predates 1818 and Henry Schoolcraft mentioned it in his journals.
