= Hog Creek (Crooked Creek tributary) =

Stream in Missouri, United States

Hog Creek is a stream in Bollinger and Cape Girardeau counties of southeast Missouri.

Coordinates of the source are: 37°23′56″N 89°57′16″W and of the confluence are: 37°16′50″N 89°51′21″W. The stream headwaters are just west of Scopus and it flows to the southeast. It flows under Missouri Route 34 about four miles east of Marble Hill. It continues to the southeast crossing into Cape Girardeau County to its confluence into Crooked Creek adjacent to the Lake Girardeau Conservation Area west of Crump.

According to tradition, Hog Creek was named for a hog thief who operated in the area.
