= Bessville, Missouri =

Unincorporated community in Missouri, U.S.

- unincorporated community
- Location of Bollinger County, Missouri
- Coordinates: 37°22′17″N 90°05′20″W
- Country: United States
- State: Missouri
- County: Bollinger
- Township: Crooked Creek
- Elevation: 591 ft (180 m)
- Time zone: UTC-6 (Central (CST))
  - Summer (DST): UTC-5 (CDT)
- Area code: 573
- GNIS feature ID: 714006

Bessville is an unincorporated community in the southern part of Crooked Creek Township in eastern Bollinger County, Missouri, United States. The community lies on the east bank of Crooked Creek and at the end of Missouri Route OO. It is located approximately seven miles northwest of Marble Hill and 5.5 miles southeast of Marquand in adjacent Madison County.

The community was established as a stop on the Belmont branch of the Iron Mountain Railroad. It was laid out soon after the railroad was built in 1869. The community was named for Sam Bess, who ran the first store, and Levi Bess, who was the community's first postmaster. The first post office in the area operated between 1856–1864, and then again between 1871-1955 after the construction of the railroad.
