= Lodge, Missouri =

- unincorporated community
- Location of Bollinger County, Missouri
- Coordinates: 37°19′26″N 90°07′41″W
- Country: United States
- State: Missouri
- County: Bollinger
- Township: Lorance
- Time zone: UTC-6 (Central (CST))
  - Summer (DST): UTC-5 (CDT)
- Area code: 573

Lodge is an unincorporated community in the western part of Lorance Township in Bollinger County, Missouri, United States. A post office was in service between 1880 and 1942.
