= Greenbrier, Missouri =

- unincorporated community
- Location of Bollinger County, Missouri
- Coordinates: 37°06′38″N 90°01′32″W
- Country: United States
- State: Missouri
- County: Bollinger
- Township: Wayne
- Elevation: 364 ft (111 m)
- Time zone: UTC-6 (Central (CST))
  - Summer (DST): UTC-5 (CDT)
- Area code: 573
- GNIS feature ID: 718819

Greenbrier is an unincorporated community in the southeastern part of Wayne Township in Bollinger County, Missouri, United States. The name Greenbrier been attributed as being due to the vegetation growing in the area, particularly blackberry and other green briers. The community was situated along the branch railroad which connected Brownwood in Stoddard County to Zalma. A post office was in operation between the years 1889–1957.
