= Manning Cabin Hollow =

Valley in the US state of Missouri

Coordinates: 37.081441°N 90.197327°W

Manning Cabin Hollow is a valley in Bollinger and Wayne counties of the U.S. state of Missouri.

Manning Cabin Hollow took its name from the rustic cabin of one Mr. Manning, a pioneer citizen.
