= Lick Log Creek (Missouri) =

Stream in the U.S. state of Missouri

Lick Log Creek is a stream in Bollinger and Wayne counties in the U.S. state of Missouri.

The headwaters are located in eastern Wayne County at 37°07′31″N 90°13′37″W and the confluence with the Castor River is in Bollinger County at 37°09′26″N 90°10′59″W.

The stream source area is in extreme eastern Wayne County east of Lowndes. The stream flows to the northeast passing under Missouri Route E just west of Gipsy to its confluence with the Castor River just north of Gipsy.

Lick Log Creek was named for a salty log at a mineral lick which attracted deer.

== See also ==
- List of rivers of Missouri
