= Buchanan, Missouri =

- unincorporated community
- Location of Bollinger County, Missouri
- Coordinates: 37°12′40″N 90°11′32″W
- Country: United States
- State: Missouri
- County: Bollinger
- Township: Filmore Township
- Time zone: UTC-6 (Central (CST))
  - Summer (DST): UTC-5 (CDT)
- Area code: 573

Buchanan is an unincorporated community in the southern part of Filmore Township in Bollinger County, Missouri, United States. The community lies approximately 18 miles southwest of Marble Hill and was named after James Buchanan, the fifteenth president of the United States, who served in office from 1857 to 1861. A post office was established in 1857 and remained in operation until 1940.
