= Lixville, Missouri =

- Unincorporated community
- Location of Bollinger County, Missouri
- Coordinates: 37°34′37″N 89°54′42″W
- Country: United States
- State: Missouri
- County: Bollinger
- Township: Whitewater
- Time zone: UTC-6 (Central (CST))
  - Summer (DST): UTC-5 (CDT)
- Area code: 573

Lixville is an unincorporated community in the northeastern part of Whitewater Township in the northeast part of Bollinger County, Missouri, United States. Lixville lies seven miles northeast of Alliance. An early pioneer to settle in the area of Lixville was a German immigrant named Henry Lix. The community was officially established in 1897 and was named for the first post master, Louis W. Lix. A post office was in operation between the years 1895–1945.
