= Allie Creek =

Stream in Missouri, U.S.

Allie Creek is a stream in northeastern Bollinger and northwestern Cape Girardeau counties of southeast Missouri.

The stream headwaters are in Bollinger County north of Lixville at 37°35′23″N 89°54′56″W and the stream flows east to its confluence with the South Fork Apple Creek in the northwest corner of Cape Girardeau County at 37°35′33″N 89°51′09″W north of Hilderbrand.

Allie Creek most likely has the name of the female relative of a pioneer settler.

== See also ==
- List of rivers of Missouri
