= Grassy, Missouri =

Unincorporated community in Missouri, U.S.

Coordinates: 37°15′39″N 90°07′25″W

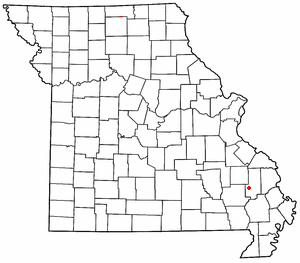

Grassy is an unincorporated community in Filmore Township in western Bollinger County, Missouri, United States.

== Geography ==
It is eight miles west of Marble Hill on Route 34.

Grassy is part of the Cape Girardeau–Jackson, MO-IL Metropolitan Statistical Area.

Located just outside Grassy are three campgrounds along the Castor River: Arrowhead Campgrounds, Castor River Park, and Twin Bridges Park.

== History ==
Grassy was named for the nearby Grassy Creek on which the community is located. The name of the creek derives from the lush sage grass that grows along the banks and in the bed of the stream.
