= Gimlet Creek =

Gimlet Creek may refer to:

- Gimlet Creek (Little Crooked Creek), a stream in Missouri
- Gimlet Creek (South Dakota), a stream in South Dakota
