= Gipsy, Missouri =

Unincorporated community in Missouri, U.S.

Coordinates: 37°08′49″N 90°10′46″W

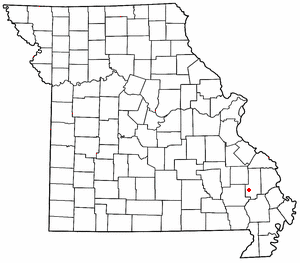

Gipsy is an unincorporated community in the northwestern part of Wayne Township in the western part of Bollinger County, Missouri, United States. It is located on Missouri Supplemental Route E, fourteen miles southwest of Marble Hill on Lick Log Creek.

== Etymology ==
Gipsy was named by J.C. Montgomery, who applied for a post office in 1908. Mr. Montgomery had come, with his large family, in a covered wagon circa 1900-1902 from Tennessee, and had camped on the old Hinkle school ground. The people of the community called the Montgomerys "gipsys" because of their manner of coming, and he used that name when he applied for the post office.

== Geography ==
Gipsy is part of the Cape Girardeau–Jackson, MO-IL Metropolitan Statistical Area.
