= Dongola, Missouri =

Unincorporated community in Missouri, U.S.

- Unincorporated community
- Location of Bollinger County, Missouri
- Coordinates: 37°10′05″N 89°57′35″W
- Country: United States
- State: Missouri
- County: Bollinger
- Township: Liberty
- Time zone: UTC-6 (Central (CST))
  - Summer (DST): UTC-5 (CDT)
- Area code: 573

Dongola is an unincorporated community in the southern part of Liberty Township in Bollinger County, Missouri, United States. The community is located nine miles south of Marble Hill on Missouri Route 51.

The origin of the name is uncertain, but may have some connection with Dongola, a small town in Union County, Illinois. A post office was in operation between 1899–1923.
