= Daisy, Missouri =

Unincorporated community in Missouri, U.S.

Coordinates: 37°24′18″N 89°27′49″W

Daisy is an unincorporated community in northwestern Cape Girardeau County, Missouri, United States. It is located sixteen miles northwest of Cape Girardeau and is part of the Cape Girardeau–Jackson, MO-IL Metropolitan Statistical Area.

A post office called Daisy has been in operation since 1887. The community has the name of a pioneer citizen's wife.
