= Orville Zimmerman =

American politician (1880–1948)

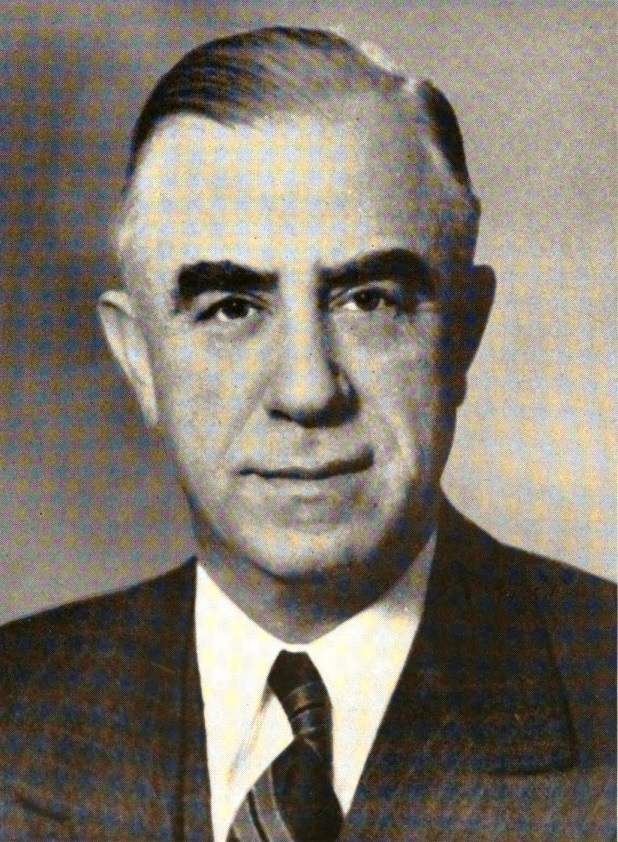
- Frontispiece of 1950's Orville Zimmerman, Late a Representative

Member of the U.S. House of Representatives from Missouri's 10th district
- In office January 3, 1935 – April 7, 1948
- Preceded by: District inactive
- Succeeded by: Paul C. Jones

Personal details
- Born: December 31, 1880 near Glenallen, Missouri, U.S.
- Died: April 7, 1948 (aged 67) Washington, D.C., U.S.
- Party: Democratic
- Occupation: Politician

Orville Zimmerman (December 31, 1880 – April 7, 1948) was an American politician. A Democrat, he was a member of the United States House of Representatives from Missouri.

== Early life and career ==
Zimmermn was born on December 31, 1880, a farm near Glen Allen, Missouri. He attended the public schools and Mayfield-Smith Academy in Marble Hill, Missouri. He graduated from Southeast Missouri State College in Cape Girardeau in 1904, and was principal of Dexter High School from 1904 to 1908. He then graduated from the law department of the University of Missouri at Columbia in 1911. Zimmerman was one of the founders and the vice-president of the Anti-Coon Club at the university, which opposed the presence of casual African American visitors on campus. He was admitted to the bar the same year and commenced practice in Kennett, Missouri. During World War I, Zimmerman served as a private in the United States Army in 1918. He married Adah Gertrude Hemphill in 1919, and they had one son, Joe Adlai Zimmerman. Zimmerman was a Methodist, and a member of the Lions Clubs International, the American Legion and the Freemasons.

Zimmerman was a member of the board of education of Kennett from 1928 to 1936 and a member of the board of regents of Southeast Missouri State College from 1933 to 1948. Zimmerman was elected as a Democrat to the United States House of Representatives in 1934 and was re-elected six additional times until his death on April 7, 1948, in Washington, D.C. In 1943, Zimmerman opposed the efforts of the Farm Security Administration (FSA) in Missouri before a House committee; he claimed the FSA was acting in bad faith on behalf of communists, protestors, unions and the media. He argued these groups had misrepresented the economic situation and rural poverty in Missouri before the national media. Sometime in the 1940s, poet H. H. Lewis thought he was under threat from the Federal Bureau of Investigation (FBI) and the Japanese Black Dragon Society. As such, Lewis outlined his suspicions in letters to Zimmerman, his congressman, which were actually being surveilled by the FBI. As Zimmerman had died without having served his full term, a special election was held and Paul C. Jones was elected as the Representative. Zimmerman was a member of the House Committee on Agriculture, House Committee on Flood Control, and the House Special Committee on Post-War Economic Policy and Planning. He was buried at Oak Ridge Cemetery in Kennett, Missouri.

== See also ==
- List of members of the American Legion
- List of members of the United States Congress who died in office (1900–1949)

U.S. House of Representatives
Preceded by District inactive	Member of the U.S. House of Representatives from Missouri's 10th congressional district 1935–1948	Succeeded by Paul C. Jones
