= Hahn, Missouri =

Unincorporated community in Missouri, U.S.

- unincorporated community
- Location of Bollinger County, Missouri
- Coordinates: 37°12′19″N 90°04′11″W
- Country: United States
- State: Missouri
- County: Bollinger
- Township: Wayne
- Time zone: UTC-6 (Central (CST))
  - Summer (DST): UTC-5 (CDT)
- Area code: 573

Hahn is an unincorporated community in the part of Wayne Township in Bollinger County, Missouri, United States. The community was established in 1895 and was named for Daniel Hahn, who settled in 1805 on the creek which also bears his name. The Hahns were one of the early families who settled in the area. A post office was in operation between 1895–1954.
