= Laflin, Missouri =

- unincorporated community
- Location of Bollinger County, Missouri
- Country: United States
- State: Missouri
- County: Bollinger
- Township: Lorance
- Elevation: 400 ft (122 m)
- Time zone: UTC-6 (Central (CST))
  - Summer (DST): UTC-5 (CDT)
- Area code: 573

Laflin is an unincorporated community in the southeastern part of Lorance Township in Bollinger County, Missouri, United States. The community is on the Crooked Creek floodplain at the end of Missouri Route U. Marble Hill is approximately 4.5 miles to the northwest.

== History ==
The community was named after Sylvester M. Laflin, who was then a director of the Belmont Branch of the St. Louis and Iron Mountain Railroad. The community was an important shipping-point for railroad timber. A post office was in operation between 1871 and 1954.
