= Pierre-Louis de Lorimier =

Colonial French-Canadian fur trader (1748–1812)

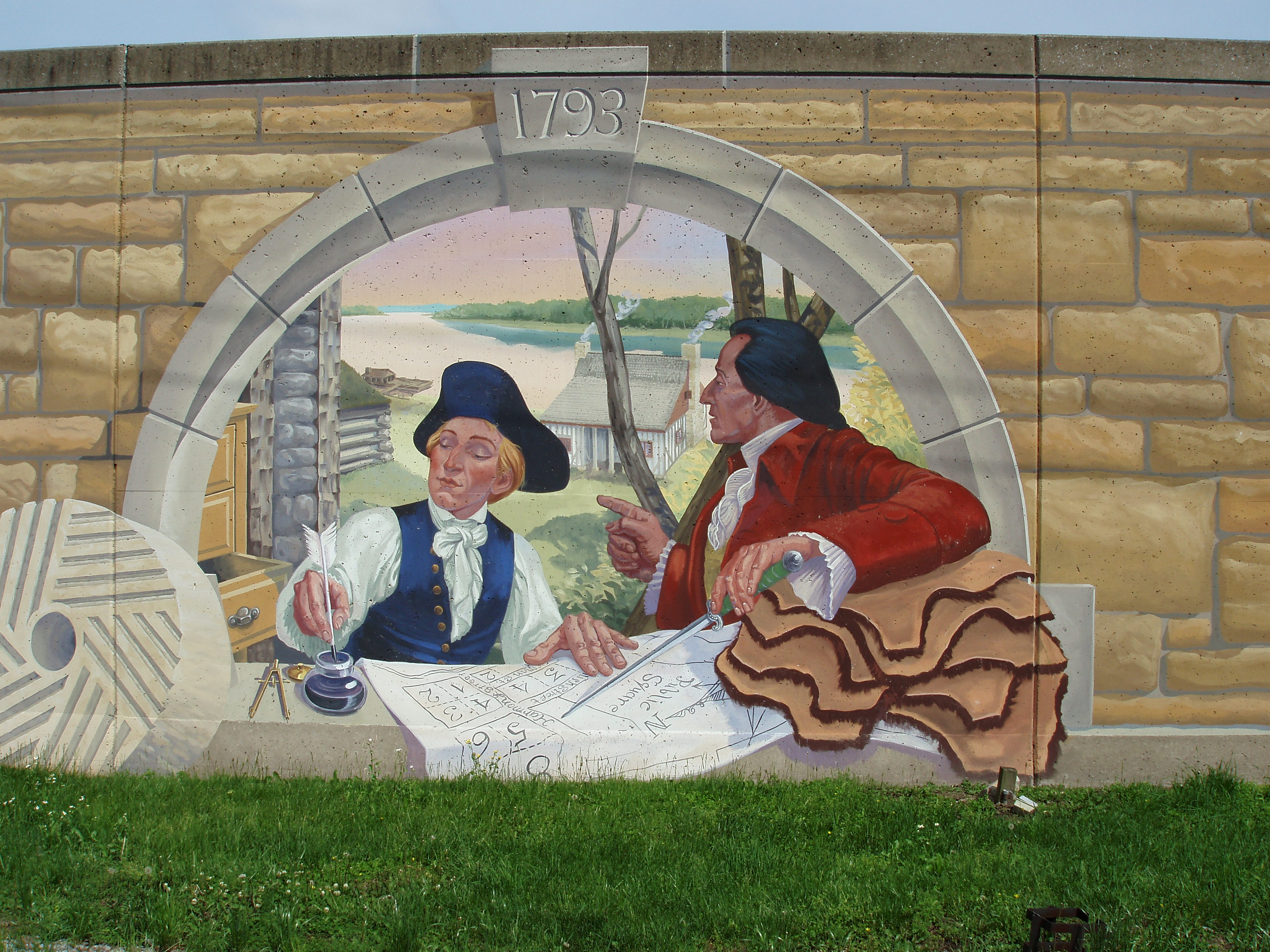
- Mississippi River Tales Mural by Tom Melvin
- Born: Mar. 1748; Montreal, Canada, New France
- Died: 26 June 1812 (aged 64); Cape Girardeau, Missouri Territory, United States

Pierre-Louis de Lorimier, usually anglicized to Peter Loramie (March 1748 – June 26, 1812), was a colonial French-Canadian fur trader, British Indian agent, and Shawnee agitator. In later years, he founded what became Cape Girardeau and Bollinger Counties, Missouri. He died in Cape Girardeau and was buried there with his Native American wife.

== Early life ==
He was born in the Saint-Étienne parish of Montreal, Canada, New France, son of Captain Claude Nicholas de Lorimier and Marie Louise Lepailleur.

In 1769, he moved south with his father and established a fur trading post in Shawnee territory in the Great Miami River valley at the confluence of Loramie Creek (later named for him). Later, he acquired as a partner in the business, James Girty, brother of the infamous Simon Girty.

In February 1778, Lorimier and another Frenchman, along with Chief Blackfish of the Shawnee, led a raid on Boonesborough, Kentucky, which resulted in capturing frontiersman Daniel Boone. They brought him to (old) Chillicothe on the Little Miami River, where they held him captive for some time. Boone escaped in June 1778, and returned to Boonesborough.

Lorimier had supported the British, and led Shawnee and Delaware Indian raids against the growing American presence. Lorimier's Indian support led to a raid by George Rogers Clark in 1782 to exterminate Indian villages along the Great Miami River. As part of that expedition, a detachment under General Benjamin Logan had ridden north to Loramie's trading post and burned it to the ground. Lorimier escaped with his life and fled west, initially to Vincennes. By 1787, he settled across the Mississippi River in present-day Missouri under Spanish sovereignty.

== Later years ==
Lorimier's first wife was Charlotte Pemanpiah (Shawnee woman) Bougainville (January 1758 – March 23, 1808), a French-Shawnee woman whom he married in Ohio Country, in 1783. They had 8 children: Agatha, Augustus, Lissette, Louis Jr., Marie Louisa, Verneuil, Victor and William. She died in 1808. Two years later, Lorimier married Marie Berthiaume, of Apple Creek in present-day Perry County, Missouri, on June 23, 1810.

Lorimier lived during a transitional period for the Cape Girardeau area, one in which its national ownership was transferred in rapid succession from Spain to France, and then to the United States via the Louisiana Purchase of 1803. Lorimier had intimate ties to the French and Shawnee refugees who helped him settle the area.

Cape Girardeau County was first settled by a mix of French-Canadian and Shawnee refugees who had fled with Lorimier from Ohio Country, and soon afterwards moved to the Spanish-held lands west of the Mississippi. By that time, the earlier indigenous tribes of that area apparently were no longer present, due presumably to their lack of resistance to European diseases such as measles and smallpox that had been carried in earlier by European traffic along the Mississippi River.

In 1798, in Cape Girardeau, Lorimier built a house that came to be known as the "Red House" which was his home, a trading post, and served as the civil and military administrative center of the district.

While in Cape Girardeau County, Captain Meriwether Lewis met with Lorimier shortly after the Lewis and Clark Expedition had started (November 25, 1803). Captain Lewis commented favorably on one of Lorimier's daughter's in his personal notes.

The second county in which Lorimier played a pivotal role was Bollinger County, for which he arranged the granting of Spanish land to George Frederick Bollinger, his family, and twenty other German Reformed families from North Carolina, including the Limbaugh family. This was technically an illegal transaction, since Spain had required that Lorimier allow only Catholics to settle in that area. However, Lorimier had been favorably impressed by George Frederick from an earlier visit he had made, and was willing to bend the rules for him and his settlers.

Pierre Lorimier died at Cape Girardeau, Missouri in 1812 and was buried alongside his Native American wife in Old Lorimier Cemetery near the city.

Loramie Creek in Ohio, where Lorimier had his trading post, is named after him. Nearby place names such as Fort Loramie, Ohio and Lake Loramie State Park also derive from his name.
