= 1976 United States presidential election in Missouri =

- November 2, 1976

Nominee	Jimmy Carter	Gerald Ford
Party	Democratic	Republican
Home state	Georgia	Michigan
Running mate	Walter Mondale	Bob Dole
Electoral vote	12	0
Popular vote	998,387	927,443
Percentage	51.10%	47.47%
County results
Carter
40–50%
50–60%
60–70%
70–80%
Ford
40–50%
50–60%
60–70%
President before election
Gerald Ford
Republican
Elected President
Jimmy Carter
Democratic

The 1976 United States presidential election in Missouri took place on November 2, 1976, as part of the 1976 United States presidential election. Voters chose 12 representatives, or electors, to the Electoral College, who voted for president and vice president.

Missouri was won by Jimmy Carter (D–Georgia), with 51.10% of the popular vote. Carter defeated incumbent President Gerald Ford (R–Michigan), who finished with 47.47% of the popular vote.

Jimmy Carter went on to become the 39th president of the United States. As of the 2024 presidential election, this is the last election in which Laclede, McDonald, Bollinger, Webster, Pettis, and Cass Counties voted for a Democratic presidential candidate, and the last time a Democrat won Missouri with the majority of the vote.

== Results ==
1976 United States presidential election in Missouri
Party	Candidate	Votes	%
Democratic	Jimmy Carter	998,387	51.10%
Republican	Gerald Ford (inc.)	927,443	47.47%
Independent	Eugene McCarthy	24,029	1.23%
Write-In		3,471	0.19%
Total votes		1,953,600	100%

=== Results by county ===
County	Jimmy Carter Democratic		Gerald Ford Republican		Various candidates Other parties		Margin		Total votes cast
County	#	%	#	%	#	%	#	%	Total votes cast
Adair	3,684	40.34%	5,249	57.47%	200	2.19%	-1,565	-17.13%	9,133
Andrew	3,042	48.96%	3,130	50.38%	41	0.66%	-88	-1.42%	6,213
Atchison	1,926	49.01%	1,960	49.87%	44	1.12%	-34	-0.86%	3,930
Audrain	5,600	50.76%	5,378	48.75%	54	0.49%	222	2.01%	11,032
Barry	5,046	49.72%	5,053	49.79%	49	0.49%	-7	-0.07%	10,148
Barton	2,326	45.81%	2,708	53.34%	43	0.85%	-382	-7.53%	5,077
Bates	4,288	55.80%	3,350	43.60%	46	0.60%	938	12.20%	7,684
Benton	2,684	48.04%	2,875	51.46%	28	0.50%	-191	-3.42%	5,587
Bollinger	2,740	56.36%	2,113	43.46%	9	0.18%	627	12.90%	4,862
Boone	17,674	50.65%	16,373	46.92%	846	2.42%	1,301	3.73%	34,893
Buchanan	17,427	51.07%	16,446	48.19%	251	0.74%	981	2.88%	34,124
Butler	6,759	54.14%	5,669	45.41%	57	0.46%	1,090	8.73%	12,485
Caldwell	2,113	49.92%	2,094	49.47%	26	0.61%	19	0.45%	4,233
Callaway	4,843	48.15%	5,115	50.85%	101	1.00%	-272	-2.70%	10,059
Camden	3,975	46.71%	4,469	52.51%	66	0.78%	-494	-5.80%	8,510
Cape Girardeau	10,440	45.07%	12,607	54.42%	117	0.51%	-2,167	-9.35%	23,164
Carroll	3,114	51.24%	2,936	48.31%	27	0.44%	178	2.93%	6,077
Carter	1,154	57.50%	842	41.95%	11	0.55%	312	15.55%	2,007
Cass	9,008	55.16%	7,182	43.98%	140	0.86%	1,826	11.18%	16,330
Cedar	2,192	44.15%	2,752	55.43%	21	0.42%	-560	-11.28%	4,965
Chariton	3,055	58.70%	2,128	40.89%	21	0.40%	927	17.81%	5,204
Christian	3,830	45.37%	4,553	53.93%	59	0.70%	-723	-8.56%	8,442
Clark	1,679	51.28%	1,582	48.32%	13	0.40%	97	2.96%	3,274
Clay	26,609	50.86%	24,962	47.71%	744	1.42%	1,647	3.15%	52,315
Clinton	3,424	54.59%	2,807	44.75%	41	0.65%	617	9.84%	6,272
Cole	7,949	35.32%	14,370	63.86%	184	0.82%	-6,421	-28.54%	22,503
Cooper	3,087	45.34%	3,694	54.25%	28	0.41%	-607	-8.91%	6,809
Crawford	3,565	52.17%	3,224	47.18%	44	0.64%	341	4.99%	6,833
Dade	1,681	45.31%	2,015	54.31%	14	0.38%	-334	-9.00%	3,710
Dallas	2,453	49.96%	2,430	49.49%	27	0.55%	23	0.47%	4,910
Daviess	2,250	53.69%	1,919	45.79%	22	0.52%	331	7.90%	4,191
DeKalb	2,023	53.53%	1,739	46.02%	17	0.45%	284	7.51%	3,779
Dent	2,931	54.27%	2,433	45.05%	37	0.69%	498	9.22%	5,401
Douglas	1,981	42.45%	2,652	56.82%	34	0.73%	-671	-14.37%	4,667
Dunklin	7,107	68.06%	3,314	31.73%	22	0.21%	3,793	36.33%	10,443
Franklin	11,695	48.04%	12,242	50.29%	405	1.66%	-547	-2.25%	24,342
Gasconade	1,702	29.95%	3,925	69.08%	55	0.97%	-2,223	-39.13%	5,682
Gentry	2,249	55.74%	1,772	43.92%	14	0.35%	477	11.82%	4,035
Greene	33,824	46.84%	37,691	52.20%	690	0.96%	-3,867	-5.36%	72,205
Grundy	2,597	49.25%	2,646	50.18%	30	0.57%	-49	-0.93%	5,273
Harrison	2,304	47.87%	2,478	51.49%	31	0.64%	-174	-3.62%	4,813
Henry	5,282	55.62%	4,168	43.89%	47	0.49%	1,114	11.73%	9,497
Hickory	1,398	49.54%	1,403	49.72%	21	0.74%	-5	-0.18%	2,822
Holt	1,529	46.08%	1,777	53.56%	12	0.36%	-248	-7.48%	3,318
Howard	2,769	61.62%	1,690	37.61%	35	0.78%	1,079	24.01%	4,494
Howell	5,265	52.47%	4,692	46.76%	78	0.78%	573	5.71%	10,035
Iron	2,646	59.68%	1,765	39.81%	23	0.52%	881	19.87%	4,434
Jackson	130,120	55.27%	101,401	43.07%	3,920	1.66%	28,719	12.20%	235,441
Jasper	14,910	46.38%	17,086	53.15%	153	0.48%	-2,176	-6.77%	32,149
Jefferson	25,159	57.29%	18,261	41.58%	495	1.13%	6,898	15.71%	43,915
Johnson	5,551	49.47%	5,513	49.14%	156	1.39%	38	0.33%	11,220
Knox	1,319	51.60%	1,216	47.57%	21	0.82%	103	4.03%	2,556
Laclede	4,381	51.69%	4,067	47.99%	27	0.32%	314	3.70%	8,475
Lafayette	6,410	48.18%	6,823	51.28%	72	0.54%	-413	-3.10%	13,305
Lawrence	5,315	47.72%	5,784	51.93%	38	0.34%	-469	-4.21%	11,137
Lewis	2,486	55.28%	1,983	44.10%	28	0.62%	503	11.18%	4,497
Lincoln	4,473	54.95%	3,581	43.99%	86	1.06%	892	10.96%	8,140
Linn	4,092	56.55%	3,114	43.03%	30	0.41%	978	13.52%	7,236
Livingston	3,819	55.69%	3,010	43.90%	28	0.41%	809	11.79%	6,857
Macon	4,296	55.88%	3,360	43.70%	32	0.42%	936	12.18%	7,688
Madison	2,229	55.88%	1,739	43.59%	21	0.53%	490	12.29%	3,989
Maries	1,796	54.52%	1,485	45.08%	13	0.39%	311	9.44%	3,294
Marion	6,124	52.51%	5,501	47.17%	38	0.33%	623	5.34%	11,663
McDonald	3,111	50.93%	2,949	48.28%	48	0.79%	162	2.65%	6,108
Mercer	1,177	53.33%	1,025	46.44%	5	0.23%	152	6.89%	2,207
Miller	2,739	39.89%	4,095	59.64%	32	0.47%	-1,356	-19.75%	6,866
Mississippi	3,366	65.79%	1,733	33.87%	17	0.33%	1,633	31.92%	5,116
Moniteau	2,462	44.32%	3,077	55.39%	16	0.29%	-615	-11.07%	5,555
Monroe	3,039	65.35%	1,585	34.09%	26	0.56%	1,454	31.26%	4,650
Montgomery	2,535	48.35%	2,665	50.83%	43	0.82%	-130	-2.48%	5,243
Morgan	2,738	48.94%	2,831	50.60%	26	0.46%	-93	-1.66%	5,595
New Madrid	5,319	65.38%	2,798	34.39%	19	0.23%	2,521	30.99%	8,136
Newton	7,045	49.26%	7,142	49.94%	114	0.80%	-97	-0.68%	14,301
Nodaway	4,875	51.13%	4,558	47.81%	101	1.06%	317	3.32%	9,534
Oregon	2,564	69.07%	1,122	30.23%	26	0.70%	1,442	38.84%	3,712
Osage	2,015	38.24%	3,224	61.19%	30	0.57%	-1,209	-22.95%	5,269
Ozark	1,341	43.19%	1,754	56.49%	10	0.32%	-413	-13.30%	3,105
Pemiscot	4,681	64.69%	2,541	35.12%	14	0.19%	2,140	29.57%	7,236
Perry	2,801	40.49%	4,086	59.06%	31	0.45%	-1,285	-18.57%	6,918
Pettis	7,887	51.56%	7,344	48.01%	65	0.42%	543	3.55%	15,296
Phelps	6,261	50.04%	6,153	49.18%	98	0.78%	108	0.86%	12,512
Pike	3,770	52.64%	3,355	46.84%	37	0.52%	415	5.80%	7,162
Platte	8,651	50.73%	8,103	47.51%	300	1.76%	548	3.22%	17,054
Polk	3,663	48.26%	3,893	51.29%	34	0.45%	-230	-3.03%	7,590
Pulaski	4,370	60.13%	2,865	39.42%	32	0.44%	1,505	20.71%	7,267
Putnam	1,097	43.02%	1,444	56.63%	9	0.35%	-347	-13.61%	2,550
Ralls	2,318	62.95%	1,334	36.23%	30	0.81%	984	26.72%	3,682
Randolph	5,839	61.59%	3,594	37.91%	48	0.50%	2,245	23.68%	9,481
Ray	5,535	65.42%	2,853	33.72%	73	0.86%	2,682	31.70%	8,461
Reynolds	2,143	70.73%	879	29.01%	8	0.26%	1,264	41.72%	3,030
Ripley	2,577	60.71%	1,640	38.63%	28	0.66%	937	22.08%	4,245
St. Charles	22,063	45.30%	26,105	53.60%	536	1.10%	-4,042	-8.30%	48,704
St. Clair	2,271	55.35%	1,808	44.07%	24	0.58%	463	11.28%	4,103
St. Francois	8,852	55.63%	7,002	44.01%	57	0.36%	1,850	11.62%	15,911
St. Louis	196,915	43.51%	246,988	54.57%	8,723	1.93%	-50,073	-11.06%	452,626
St. Louis City	118,703	66.03%	58,367	32.47%	2,714	1.50%	60,336	33.56%	179,784
Ste. Genevieve	3,091	57.54%	2,241	41.72%	40	0.74%	850	15.82%	5,372
Saline	5,890	54.31%	4,883	45.03%	72	0.66%	1,007	9.28%	10,845
Schuyler	1,417	54.08%	1,193	45.53%	10	0.38%	224	8.55%	2,620
Scotland	1,449	52.65%	1,286	46.73%	17	0.62%	163	5.92%	2,752
Scott	8,075	59.48%	5,473	40.31%	28	0.21%	2,602	19.17%	13,576
Shannon	1,960	65.97%	989	33.29%	22	0.74%	971	32.68%	2,971
Shelby	2,227	60.16%	1,453	39.25%	22	0.59%	774	20.91%	3,702
Stoddard	6,097	60.30%	3,989	39.45%	25	0.25%	2,108	20.85%	10,111
Stone	2,358	40.36%	3,457	59.17%	27	0.46%	-1,099	-18.81%	5,842
Sullivan	2,313	51.58%	2,141	47.75%	30	0.67%	172	3.83%	4,484
Taney	3,626	43.46%	4,696	56.28%	22	0.26%	-1,070	-12.82%	8,344
Texas	4,638	57.84%	3,338	41.63%	42	0.52%	1,300	16.21%	8,018
Vernon	4,921	56.67%	3,715	42.78%	48	0.55%	1,206	13.89%	8,684
Warren	2,164	39.85%	3,214	59.19%	52	0.96%	-1,050	-19.34%	5,430
Washington	3,543	58.01%	2,526	41.36%	39	0.64%	1,017	16.65%	6,108
Wayne	2,987	60.25%	1,963	39.59%	8	0.16%	1,024	20.66%	4,958
Webster	3,759	51.39%	3,510	47.98%	46	0.63%	249	3.41%	7,315
Worth	969	55.40%	771	44.08%	9	0.52%	198	11.32%	1,749
Wright	2,781	44.92%	3,397	54.87%	13	0.21%	-616	-9.95%	6,191
Totals	998,387	51.10%	927,443	47.47%	27,770	1.42%	70,944	3.63%	1,953,600

==== Counties that flipped from Republican to Democratic ====
- Audrain
- Bates
- Bollinger
- Butler
- Caldwell
- Carroll
- Carter
- Cass
- Chariton
- Clark
- Clay
- Clinton
- Crawford
- Dallas
- Daviess
- DeKalb
- Dent
- Gentry
- Henry
- Howell
- Jefferson
- Johnson
- Jackson
- Knox
- Laclede
- Lewis
- Lincoln
- Linn
- Livingston
- Macon
- Madison
- Maries
- Marion
- McDonald
- Mercer
- Mississippi
- Oregon
- Nodaway
- Pettis
- Phelps
- Pike
- Platte
- Pulaski
- Randolph
- Reynolds
- Ripley
- St. Clair
- St. Francois
- Schuyler
- Scotland
- Scott
- Saline
- Shelby
- Stoddard
- Sullivan
- Texas
- Vernon
- Washington
- Webster
- Wayne
- Worth
- Boone
- Buchanan
- Dunklin
- Howard
- Iron
- New Madrid
- Pemiscot
- Ralls
- Ray
- Ste Genevieve
- Shannon

=== By congressional district ===
Carter and Ford each won five of ten congressional districts. Ford won four districts that elected Democrats, while Carter won one that elected a Republican.

District	Carter	Ford	Representative
1st	71%	29%	Bill Clay
2nd	43%	57%	Robert A. Young
3rd	49%	51%	Dick Gephardt
4th	52%	48%	Ike Skelton
5th	59%	41%	Richard Bolling
6th	52%	48%	Tom Coleman
7th	47%	53%	Gene Taylor
8th	47%	53%	Richard Howard Ichord Jr.
9th	50%	50%	Harold Volkmer
10th	57%	43%	Bill Burlison

== See also ==
- United States presidential elections in Missouri
