= Alliance, Missouri =

- unincorporated community
- Location of Bollinger County, Missouri
- Coordinates: 37°33′44″N 89°59′48″W
- Country: United States
- State: Missouri
- County: Bollinger
- Time zone: UTC-6 (Central (CST))
  - Summer (DST): UTC-5 (CDT)
- Area code: 573

Alliance is an unincorporated community in the northwestern part of Whitewater Township in Bollinger County, Missouri, United States.

The community was named after the organization Farmer's Alliance, an organized agrarian economic movement among American farmers which had been organized in Illinois in 1880. Farmer's Alliance was a strong and flourishing organization in Alliance at that time. Alliance is also called Jugtown because of the pottery that was manufactured from the clay found there. A post office was established there in 1889 and was in operation until 1953.
