= Sturdivant, Missouri =

Unincorporated community in Missouri, U.S.

Coordinates: 37°02′58″N 90°00′50″W

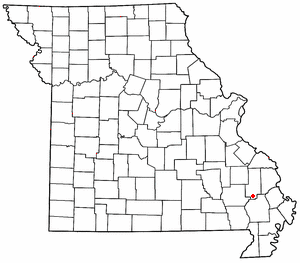

Sturdivant is an unincorporated community in the southern part of Wayne Township in extreme southern Bollinger County, Missouri, United States. It is located approximately sixteen miles north of Dexter along State Highway V. The zip code is 63782. It is part of the Cape Girardeau–Jackson, MO-IL Metropolitan Statistical Area.

Sturdivant was platted in 1869 when the railroad was extended to that point. The community was named after Robert Sturdivant, a Cape Girardeau banker. A post office called Sturdivant has been in operation since 1888.
