= Lutesville, Missouri =

Extinct community in Missouri, U.S.

Coordinates: 37°18′01″N 89°58′52″W

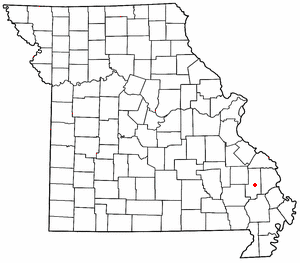

Lutesville was a city in Bollinger County, Missouri, United States. It was adjacent to and southwest of Marble Hill on Route 51 and Route 34. Crooked Creek flows between Lutesville and Marble Hill and Opossum Creek flows past to the south.

== History ==
Historical population
Census	Pop.	Note	%±
1900	525		—
1910	551		5.0%
1920	585		6.2%
1930	582		−0.5%
1940	581		−0.2%
1950	694		19.4%
1960	658		−5.2%
1970	626		−4.9%
1980	865		38.2%
Missouri Census Data Center

In 1869, the city was laid out to secure a St. Louis, Iron Mountain and Southern Railway depot location. It was named after its founder, Eli Lutes. The railroad ceased operations through Lutesville in 1973.

In 1985, the cities of Lutesville and Marble Hill merged to form one city, retaining the name Marble Hill. The former prospering city of Lutesville has been a part of the City of Marble Hill since then. Prior to the closing of the Lutesville post office in 1992, the Zip code of Lutesville was 63762.

Dry Creek Cemetery is located in Lutesville.
