= Huskey, Missouri =

Unincorporated community in Missouri, U.S.

Coordinates: 37°19′10″N 89°53′15″W

Huskey is an unincorporated community in Bollinger County, in the U.S. state of Missouri.

== History ==
A post office called Huskey was established in 1887, and remained in operation until 1907. The community has the name of Thomas Huskey, an early settler.
