= Tallent, Missouri =

Unincorporated community in Missouri, U.S.

- Unincorporated community
- Location of Bollinger County, Missouri
- Coordinates: 37°27′55″N 90°04′06″W
- Country: United States
- State: Missouri
- County: Bollinger
- Township: Crooked Creek
- Elevation: 807 ft (246 m)
- Time zone: UTC-6 (Central (CST))
  - Summer (DST): UTC-5 (CDT)
- Area code: 573
- GNIS feature ID: 752485

Tallent is an unincorporated community in the northern part of Crooked Creek Township in Bollinger County, Missouri, United States. Tallent lies 4 1/2 miles southwest of Patton, and was named for Reverend George W. Tallent, who was a local minister and school commissioner. A post office was established here in 1902, and operated until 1935.
