= Paul C. Jones =

American politician (1901–1981)

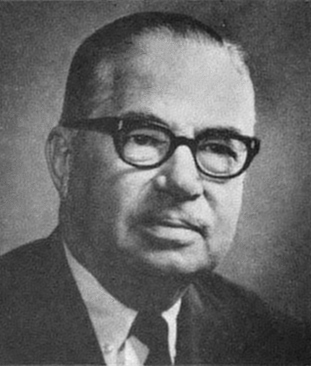

Member of the U.S. House of Representatives from Missouri's 10th district
- In office November 2, 1948 – January 3, 1969
- Preceded by: Orville Zimmerman
- Succeeded by: Bill Burlison

Member of the Missouri House of Representatives
- In office 1935–1937

Member of the Missouri Senate
- In office 1937–1944

Personal details
- Born: March 12, 1901 Kennett, Missouri, U.S.
- Died: February 10, 1981 (aged 79) Kennett, Missouri, U.S.
- Party: Democratic

Paul Caruthers Jones (March 12, 1901 – February 10, 1981) was an American politician who served as a U.S. Representative from Missouri.

== Biography ==
Born in Kennett, Missouri, Jones attended the Kennett public schools. He was graduated from the University of Missouri with a B.J. degree in 1923. He served as a member of the Kennett city council from 1931 to 1933 and as mayor of Kennett from 1933 to 1935. He served as a member and president of the Kennett board of education from 1934 to 1946 and in the state House of Representatives from 1935 to 1937. He then served as a member of the state Senate from 1937 to 1944.

He was co-publisher of the Dunklin Democrat, a newspaper in Kennett, from 1923 until February 1953. He also served as general manager of KBOA (AM) and KBOA-FM, Kennett's first radio station, which he helped to found, from 1947 until October 1966.

From August 1945 to May 1948, he served as chairman of the Missouri State Highway Commission. He was appointed by Governor Lloyd C. Stark of Missouri in December 1940 to organize the Sixth Missouri Infantry, Missouri State Guard, and was commanding officer (colonel) of that voluntary regiment until June 1946.

Jones was elected as a Democrat to the 80th U.S. Congress to fill the vacancy caused by the death of Orville Zimmerman and at the same time was elected to the 81st Congress. He was reelected to the nine succeeding Congresses and served from November 2, 1948, to January 3, 1969. He was not a candidate for reelection in 1968 to the 91st Congress.

While Jones did not sign the 1956 Southern Manifesto, he voted against the Civil Rights Acts of 1957, the Civil Rights Acts of 1960, the Civil Rights Acts of 1964, and the Civil Rights Acts of 1968 as well as the 24th Amendment to the U.S. Constitution and the Voting Rights Act of 1965.

Jones resided in Kennett until his death on February 10, 1981.

U.S. House of Representatives
Preceded by Orville Zimmerman	Member of the U.S. House of Representatives from Missouri's 10th congressional district 1948–1969	Succeeded by William D. Burlison
