= Precinct, Missouri =

Unincorporated community in Missouri, U.S.

Precinct
- Unincorporated community
- Location in Missouri, United States
- Coordinates: 37°33′07″N 90°01′13″W
- Country: United States
- State: Missouri
- County: Bollinger
- Post office established: 1902
- Post office closed: 1904
- Time zone: UTC−6 (CST)

Precinct is an unincorporated community in Bollinger County, in the U.S. state of Missouri.

== History ==
A post office called Precinct was established in 1902, and closed in 1904. The community most likely was named for an election precinct located in or around the original town site.
