= Scopus, Missouri =

Unincorporated community in Missouri, U.S.

Coordinates: 37°23′56″N 89°55′19″W

Scopus is an unincorporated community in central Bollinger County in Southeast Missouri, United States. It is located approximately nine miles northeast of Marble Hill at the intersection of Highway B and Highway M.

Scopus is part of the Cape Girardeau-Jackson, MO-IL Metropolitan Statistical Area. Scopus shares the ZIP code 63764 with Marble Hill. Students in Scopus attend Woodland R-IV School District.
