= Scopus Township, Bollinger County, Missouri =

Scopus Township
- Township
- Coordinates: 37°26′02″N 089°55′29″W
- Country: United States
- State: Missouri
- County: Bollinger

Area
  - Total: 62.53 sq mi (161.96 km^{2})
  - Land: 62.53 sq mi (161.96 km^{2})
  - Water: 0 sq mi (0 km^{2}) 0%
- Elevation: 590 ft (180 m)

Population (2010)
  - Total: 1,518
  - Density: 101.2/sq mi (39.07/km^{2})
- FIPS code: 29-66314
- GNIS feature ID: 0766325

Scopus Township is one of eight townships in Bollinger County, Missouri, USA. As of the 2000 U.S. census, its population was 1,348. As of the 2010 U.S. census, the population had increased to 1,518. Scopus Township covers 62.53 square miles (162.0 km^{2}).

Scopus Township was originally called German Township; the original name was changed due to Anti-German sentiment during World War I.

== Demographics ==
As of the 2010 U.S. census, there were 1,518 people living in the township. The population density was 24.28 inhabitants per square mile (9.37/km^{2}). There were 654 housing units in the township. The racial makeup of the township was 98.68% White, 0.46% Black or African American, 0.33% Native American, 0.26% Asian, and 0.26% from two or more races. Approximately 0.86% of the population were Hispanic or Latino of any race.

== Geography ==
=== Incorporated areas ===
The township contains no incorporated settlements.

=== Unincorporated areas ===
The township contains the unincorporated area and historical community of Scopus.

=== Cemeteries ===
The township contains the following 15 cemeteries: Ates, Bess, Burton, Chostner, Coles, Cook, Hartle, Holt, James, Judge Long, Limbaugh, Mountain View, Pulliam, and Seabaugh.

=== Streams ===
The streams of Baker Branch, Big Blue Branch, Big Hollow Branch, Bollinger Branch, Cedar Branch, Cheek Creek, Cooks Branch, Fish Branch, German Branch, Hog Creek, James Creek, Little Muddy Creek, Little Whitewater Creek, Mayfield Creek, Panther Creek, Wolf Creek, and Yantz Branch flow through Scopus Township.

=== Landmarks ===
There are no known landmarks in the township.

== Administrative districts ==
=== School districts ===
- Meadow Heights R-II School District
- Woodland R-IV School District

=== Political Districts ===
- Missouri's 8th Congressional District
- State House District 145
- State Senate District 27

== Notable people ==
Edward Capehart O'Kelley, outlaw known for killing Robert Ford, the man who killed Jesse James.
