= Perkins Creek =

Stream in the American state of Missouri

Coordinates: 37.1583855°N 90.0923244°W

Perkins Creek is a stream in Bollinger County in the U.S. state of Missouri.

Perkins Creek has the name of Peter Perkins, an early citizen.

== See also ==
- List of rivers of Missouri
