= Patton, Missouri =

Unincorporated community in Missouri, U.S.

Coordinates: 37°30′08″N 90°00′48″W

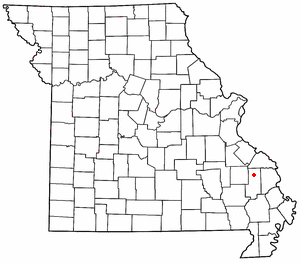

Patton is an unincorporated community in the southeastern part of Union Township in northern Bollinger County in Southeast Missouri, United States. It is located on State Highway 51, approximately one mile south of the intersection with Route 72 (referred to as Patton Junction) along Little Whitewater Creek and 15 miles north of Marble Hill. The ZIP Code for Patton is 63662.

Patton is part of the Cape Girardeau–Jackson, MO-IL Metropolitan Statistical Area.

== Name ==
In the early pioneer days, Patton had a dancing place at which the people danced long after the fiddlers were exhausted by patting hands. The expression "keep a pattin'" was used so often that the place was named Patton.

== History ==
A post office was established in 1874 and named for the Patton family, of whom J.J. and Harvey Patton were prominent family members.

== Education ==
The Meadow Heights R-II School District, located on Route 72 just outside Patton, encompasses most of northern Bollinger County. According to the Missouri Department of Elementary and Secondary Education, there was a total of 593 students and 55 certified staff members enrolled in the district during the 2008–2009 school year. The school colors are red and black and its mascot is the panther. Athletics at the school consists of boys' and girls' basketball, girls' volleyball, cheerleading, boys' baseball, girls' softball, track and field, and cross country. During the 2005–2006 season, the boys' basketball team set a national record for the number of three-pointers (36) in a single high school basketball game.

== Miscellaneous ==
- A graduate of Patton High School in the late 1930s who lived in the area claimed that there were still members of the Frank and Jesse James Gang residing in Bollinger County during his childhood.
- Edward Capehart O'Kelley was reportedly born in Patton in 1858 and raised there. O'Kelley shot and killed Robert Ford, the man who fatally shot Jesse James. A memorial to O'Kelley for this act stands in the Patton United Methodist Church cemetery, on Country Road 878.
