= Cheek Creek =

Stream in Bollinger County, Missouri, U.S.

Coordinates: 37.4689434°N 89.9098254°W

Cheek Creek is a stream in Bollinger County in the U.S. state of Missouri.

Cheek Creek has the name of James Cheek, an early settler.

== See also ==
- List of rivers of Missouri
