= Sedgewickville, Missouri =

- Village
- Location of Sedgewickville, Missouri
- Coordinates: 37°30′53″N 89°54′22″W
- Country: United States
- State: Missouri
- County: Bollinger
- Incorporated: 1898

Area
  - Total: 0.64 sq mi (1.66 km^{2})
  - Land: 0.64 sq mi (1.66 km^{2})
  - Water: 0 sq mi (0.00 km^{2})
- Elevation: 604 ft (184 m)

Population (2020)
  - Total: 191
  - Density: 298.2/sq mi (115.15/km^{2})
- Time zone: UTC-6 (Central (CST))
  - Summer (DST): UTC-5 (CDT)
- ZIP code: 63781
- Area code: 573
- FIPS code: 29-66476
- GNIS feature ID: 2399783

Sedgewickville is a village in northern Bollinger County in Southeast Missouri, United States. The population was 191 at the 2020 census.

Sedgewickville is part of the Cape Girardeau–Jackson, MO-IL Metropolitan Statistical Area.

== Etymology ==
Sedgewickville was originally called Smithville; the present name was adopted in 1892.

== Geography ==
According to the United States Census Bureau, the village has a total area of 0.64 square miles (1.66 km^{2}), all land.

== Demographics ==
Historical population
| Census | Pop. | Note | %± |
|---|---|---|---|
| 1940 | 100 | | — |
| 1950 | 92 | | −8.0% |
| 1960 | 91 | | −1.1% |
| 1970 | 92 | | 1.1% |
| 1980 | 115 | | 25.0% |
| 1990 | 138 | | 20.0% |
| 2000 | 197 | | 42.8% |
| 2010 | 173 | | −12.2% |
| 2020 | 191 | | 10.4% |
U.S. Decennial Census

=== 2010 census ===
As of the census of 2010, there were 173 people, 61 households, and 41 families living in the village. The population density was 270.3 inhabitants per square mile (104.4/km^{2}). There were 68 housing units at an average density of 106.3 per square mile (41.0/km^{2}). The racial makeup of the village was 100.00% White. Hispanic or Latino of any race were 1.73% of the population.

There were 61 households, of which 47.5% had children under the age of 18 living with them, 50.8% were married couples living together, 8.2% had a female householder with no husband present, 8.2% had a male householder with no wife present, and 32.8% were non-families. 19.7% of all households were made up of individuals, and 11.5% had someone living alone who was 65 years of age or older. The average household size was 2.84 and the average family size was 3.34.

The median age in the village was 30.5 years. 28.9% of residents were under the age of 18; 11.5% were between the ages of 18 and 24; 33.5% were from 25 to 44; 18.6% were from 45 to 64; and 7.5% were 65 years of age or older. The gender makeup of the village was 49.7% male and 50.3% female.

=== 2000 census ===
As of the census of 2000, there were 197 people, 69 households, and 54 families living in the village. The population density was 311.5 inhabitants per square mile (120.3/km^{2}). There were 75 housing units at an average density of 118.6 per square mile (45.8/km^{2}). The racial makeup of the village was 99.49% White, and 0.51% from two or more races. Hispanic or Latino of any race were 1.02% of the population.

There were 69 households, out of which 44.9% had children under the age of 18 living with them, 66.7% were married couples living together, 7.2% had a female householder with no husband present, and 21.7% were non-families. 17.4% of all households were made up of individuals, and 11.6% had someone living alone who was 65 years of age or older. The average household size was 2.86 and the average family size was 3.26.

In the village, the population was spread out, with 33.5% under the age of 18, 6.1% from 18 to 24, 34.5% from 25 to 44, 13.2% from 45 to 64, and 12.7% who were 65 years of age or older. The median age was 30 years. For every 100 females, there were 105.2 males. For every 100 females age 18 and over, there were 104.7 males.

The median income for a household in the village was $35,156, and the median income for a family was $34,464. Males had a median income of $26,250 versus $14,375 for females. The per capita income for the village was $11,962. About 8.5% of families and 14.0% of the population were below the poverty line, including 16.0% of those under the age of eighteen and 23.1% of those 65 or over.
