= Whitewater Township, Bollinger County, Missouri =

Whitewater Township
- Township
- Coordinates: 37°32′26″N 089°55′33″W
- Country: United States
- State: Missouri
- County: Bollinger

Area
  - Total: 51.76 sq mi (134.05 km^{2})
  - Land: 51.76 sq mi (134.05 km^{2})
  - Water: 0 sq mi (0 km^{2}) 0%
- Elevation: 571 ft (174 m)

Population (2000)
  - Total: 1,029
  - Density: 133.4/sq mi (51.49/km^{2})
- FIPS code: 29-79594
- GNIS feature ID: 0766328

Whitewater Township is one of eight townships in Bollinger County, Missouri, USA. As of the 2000 U.S. census, its population was 911. As of the 2010 U.S. census, the population had increased to 1,029. Whitewater Township covers an area of 51.76 square miles (134.1 km^{2}).

Whitewater Township was erected in 1872, and named after the nearby Whitewater River.

== Demographics ==
As of the 2010 U.S. census, there were 1,029 people living in the township. The population density was 19.88 inhabitants per square mile (7.68/km^{2}). There were 438 households in the township. The racial makeup of the township was 99.13% White, 0.10% Native American, 0.10% from other races, and 0.68% from two or more races. Approximately 1.46% of the population were Hispanic or Latino of any race.

== Geography ==
=== Incorporated areas ===
The township contains one incorporated settlement: Sedgewickville.

=== Unincorporated areas ===
The town contains the unincorporated area and historical community of Lixville.

=== Cemeteries ===
The township contains the eight following cemeteries: Bollinger, Flatwood, Grindstaff, Jones, Meyer, Old Bollinger, Shrum, and Statler.

=== Streams ===
The streams of Allie Creek, Bollinger Creek, Buck Creek, Caney Fork, Jack Creek, Little Muddy Creek, Shrum Creek, South Fork Apple Creek, and Wolf Creek flow through Whitewater Township. Other bodies of water located in the township include Richardet Lake and the Whitewater River.

=== Landmarks ===
There are no known landmarks in the township.

== Administrative districts ==
=== School districts ===
- Jackson R-II School District
- Meadow Heights R-II School District
- Oak Ridge R-VI School District
- Perry County 32 School District
