= Crump, Missouri =

Unincorporated community in Missouri, U.S.

Coordinates: 37°16′43″N 89°49′45″W

Crump is an unincorporated community in western Cape Girardeau County, in the U.S. state of Missouri.

The community is located on Missouri Route U, just southeast of the Lake Girardeau Conservation Area. Cape Girardeau is 15 miles to the east of the community and Marble Hill is seven miles to the west-northwest in Bollinger County.

== History ==
The community was named for an early settler in 1886. It had earlier been called Crossroads. The community had a post office between 1882 and 1907 and again between 1926 and 1939.
