= Gimlet Creek (Missouri) =

Stream in the American state of Missouri

Coordinates: 37.3144983°N 90.0342706°W

Gimlet Creek is a stream in Bollinger County in the U.S. state of Missouri.

Gimlet Creek most likely was so named for its resemblance to a gimlet.

== See also ==
- List of rivers of Missouri
