= Drum, Missouri =

Unincorporated community in Missouri, U.S.

- Unincorporated community
- Location of Bollinger County, Missouri
- Coordinates: 37°11′19″N 89°53′37″W
- Country: United States
- State: Missouri
- County: Bollinger
- Township: Liberty
- Time zone: UTC-6 (Central (CST))
  - Summer (DST): UTC-5 (CDT)
- Area code: 573

Drum is an unincorporated community in the eastern part of Liberty Township in Bollinger County, Missouri, United States. The community was named for the Drum family, who were prominent pioneers. A post office operated between the years 1893–1916.
