= Glennon, Missouri =

- unincorporated community
- Location of Bollinger County, Missouri
- Coordinates: 37°11′20″N 89°55′06″W
- Country: United States
- State: Missouri
- County: Bollinger
- Township: Liberty
- Elevation: 541 ft (165 m)
- Time zone: UTC-6 (Central (CST))
  - Summer (DST): UTC-5 (CDT)
- Area code: 573
- GNIS feature ID: 718516

Glennon is an unincorporated community in the eastern part of Liberty Township in Bollinger County, Missouri, United States.

This Catholic community was established in 1928, and was named for Archbishop John J. Glennon, who served as the Roman Catholic Archbishop of St. Louis from 1903 until his death in 1946.
