= George Frederick Bollinger =

American pioneer

George Frederick Bollinger (1770–1842) was an American pioneer. He was born in Tryon County, North Carolina. Both Bollinger County, Missouri and Fredericktown, Missouri are named after him.

He was the eleventh of the twelve children of Heinrich Bollinger. George Bollinger persuaded twenty other families to leave North Carolina in the fall of 1799 and settle in a region immediately west of what is now Cape Girardeau, Missouri. One of these families was the Limbaugh family, of whom the most widely known descendant is Rush Limbaugh. To acquire the land, Bollinger first had to sign a document asserting that he and his fellow settlers were all Catholics. In reality, most of the group were members of the German Reformed Church, and none were Catholic. However, Don Louis Lorimier, the Spanish Land Commandant of Cape Girardeau, had been impressed by Bollinger on an earlier visit and was willing to bend the rules for him and his fellow settlers.
