= Arab, Missouri =

Unincorporated community in Missouri, U.S.

Arab
- Unincorporated community
- Location within Missouri
- Coordinates: 37°05′37″N 90°04′36″W
- Country: United States
- State: Missouri
- County: Bollinger

Arab is an unincorporated community in southern Bollinger County, Missouri, United States. It is located approximately four miles south of Zalma and 16 miles north of Puxico, at the intersection of Missouri Route 51 with routes C and P. Dexter lies about twenty miles to the south-southeast. The community was founded in 1908 and receives its name from the city of Arab, Alabama.

Arab was originally located in Wayne County. In 1943, the post office and community were moved four miles away to extreme southern Bollinger County.
