= Liberty Township, Bollinger County, Missouri =

Liberty Township
- Township
- Coordinates: 37°11′45″N 089°57′53″W
- Country: United States
- State: Missouri
- County: Bollinger

Area
  - Total: 91.51 sq mi (237.02 km^{2})
  - Land: 91.4 sq mi (236.8 km^{2})
  - Water: 0.085 sq mi (0.22 km^{2}) 0.09%
- Elevation: 449 ft (137 m)

Population (2010)
  - Total: 1,371
  - Density: 38.8/sq mi (14.98/km^{2})
- FIPS code: 29-41960
- GNIS feature ID: 0766323

Liberty Township is one of eight townships in Bollinger County, Missouri, USA. As of the 2000 U.S. census, its population was 1,224. As of the 2010 U.S. census, its population had increased to 1,371. Liberty Township covers an area of 91.51 square miles (237.0 km^{2}).

== Demographics ==
As of the 2010 U.S. census, there were 1,371 people living in the township. The population density was 14.98 inhabitants per square mile (5.78/km^{2}). There were 627 housing units in the township. The racial makeup of the township was 98.61% White, 0.51% Native American, 0.07% Asian, 0.22% from other races, and 0.58% from two or more races. Approximately 0.51% of the population were Hispanic or Latino of any race.

== Geography ==
=== Incorporated areas ===
The township contains no incorporated settlements.

=== Unincorporated areas ===
The township contains the unincorporated areas and historical communities of Dongola, Drum, Glennon, Hahn, Sank, and Schlatitz.

=== Cemeteries ===
The township contains the following six cemeteries: Cane Creek, Crites, Frazier, Kellion, Mansion, Mansker, and Wayne.

=== Streams ===
The streams of Cane Creek, Clubb Creek, Dry Creek, Gizzard Creek, Hawker Creek, Malone Creek, Perkins Creek, and Virgin Creek flow through Liberty Township. Other bodies of water located in the township include the Diversion Headwater Channel, Virgin Creek Lake, and Whippoorwill Lake.

=== Landmarks ===
- Clubb Creek Conservation Area
- Sank Conservation Area
- Whippoorwill Lake Family Campground

== Administrative districts ==
=== School districts ===
- Advance R-IV School District
- Delta R-V School District
- Leopold R-III School District
- Woodland R-IV School District
- Zalma R-V School District

=== Political Districts ===
- Missouri's 8th Congressional District
- State House District 145
- State Senate District 27
