= Filmore Township, Bollinger County, Missouri =

Township in the US state of Missouri

Filmore Township
- Township
- Location in Bollinger County
- Coordinates: 37°14′38″N 90°09′54″W
- Country: United States
- State: Missouri
- County: Bollinger

Area
  - Total: 60.71 sq mi (157.23 km^{2})
  - Land: 60.65 sq mi (157.08 km^{2})
  - Water: 0.058 sq mi (0.15 km^{2}) 0.1%
- Elevation: 636 ft (194 m)

Population (2010)
  - Total: 488
  - Density: 33.5/sq mi (12.92/km^{2})
- Time zone: UTC-6 (CST)
  - Summer (DST): UTC-5 (CDT)
- ZIP codes: 63750, 63751, 63753, 63764, 63787
- GNIS feature ID: 0766322

Filmore Township is one of eight townships in Bollinger County, Missouri, USA. As of the 2000 U.S. census, its population was 508. As of the 2010 U.S. census, the population had decreased to 488. Filmore Township covers an area of 60.71 square miles (157.2 km^{2}).

Filmore Township was established in 1851, and named in honor President Millard Fillmore.

== Demographics ==
As of the 2010 U.S. census, there were 488 people living in the township. The population density was 8.03 people per square mile (3.10 people/km^{2}). There were 308 housing units in the township. The racial makeup of the township was 96.31% White, 0.20% Black or African American, 2.05% Native American, 0.20% from other races, and 1.23% from two or more races. Approximately 0.20% of the population were Hispanic or Latino of any race.

== Geography ==
=== Incorporated areas ===
The township contains no incorporated settlements.

=== Unincorporated areas ===
The township contains the following two unincorporated areas and historical communities:

- Buchanan at 37°12′40″N 90°11′32″W
- Grassy at 37°15′39″N 90°07′25″W

=== Cemeteries ===
The township contains the following six cemeteries: Kinder Chapel, Burk, Mouser, Patterson, Ray, and Scott.

=== Streams ===
The streams of Castor River, Grassy Creek, Little Grassy Creek, Perkins Creek, and Trace Creek flow through Filmore Township.

=== Landmarks ===
- Arrowhead Campground
- Blue Pond
- Castor River
- Castor River Conservation Area
- Castor River Park
- Twin Bridges Campground

=== Transportation ===
- Missouri Route 34

== Administrative districts ==
=== School districts ===
- Woodland R-IV School District
- Zalma R-V School District

=== Political Districts ===
- Missouri's 8th Congressional District
- State House District 145
- State Senate District 27
