= Wayne Township, Bollinger County, Missouri =

Wayne Township
- Township
- Coordinates: 37°06′31″N 090°04′23″W
- Country: United States
- State: Missouri
- County: Bollinger

Area
  - Total: 108.91 sq mi (282.07 km^{2})
  - Land: 108.8 sq mi (281.9 km^{2})
  - Water: 0.066 sq mi (0.17 km^{2}) 0.06%
- Elevation: 449 ft (137 m)

Population (2010)
  - Total: 1,299
  - Density: 50/sq mi (19.2/km^{2})
- FIPS code: 29-77956
- GNIS feature ID: 0766327

Wayne Township is one of eight townships in Bollinger County, Missouri, USA. As of the 2000 U.S. census, its population was 1,415. As of the 2010 U.S. census, the population had decreased to 1,299. Wayne Township covers an area of 108.91 square miles (282.1 km^{2}).

== Demographics ==
As of the 2010 U.S. census, there were 1,299 people living in the township. The population density was 11.93 inhabitants per square mile (4.61/km^{2}). There were 740 housing units in the township. The racial makeup of the township was 99.31% White, 0.15% Asian, and 0.54% from two or more races. Approximately 0.69% of the population were Hispanic or Latino of any race.

== Geography ==
=== Incorporated areas ===
The township contains one incorporated settlement: Zalma.

=== Unincorporated areas ===
The township contains the unincorporated areas and historical communities of Arab, April Hills, Gipsy, Greenbrier, and Sturdivant.

=== Cemeteries ===
The township contains the nine following cemeteries: Cato, Clubb, Cox, Eakers, Maddox, Mount Pleasant, Speer, Sturdivant, and White.

=== Streams ===
The streams of Bear Creek, Brush Creek, Cypress Slough, Jesse Creek, Lick Log Creek, Mitz Branch, Perkins Creek, Pond Creek, Slagle Creek, and Talley Branch flow through Wayne Township. Other bodies of water located in the township include the Castor River, Cypress Pond, the Headwater Diversion Channel, and Wonder (Sherman's) Lake.

=== Landmarks ===
- Castor River Conservation Area
- Dark Cypress Swamp State Wildlife Area
- Duck Creek Conservation Area
- Gipsy Tower Site
- Maple Flats Access
- Mill Dam
- Sweetgum Access

== Administrative districts ==
=== School districts ===
- Zalma R-V School District

=== Political Districts ===
- Missouri's 8th Congressional District
- State House District 145
- State Senate District 27
