= Bollinger County, Missouri =

County in Missouri, United States

- County
- Bollinger County Courthouse, November 2026

- Location within the U.S. state of Missouri
- Coordinates: 37°19′N 90°02′W
- Country: United States
- State: Missouri
- Founded: March 1, 1851
- Named for: George Frederick Bollinger
- Seat: Marble Hill
- Largest city: Marble Hill

Area
  - Total: 621 sq mi (1,610 km^{2})
  - Land: 618 sq mi (1,600 km^{2})
  - Water: 3.3 sq mi (8.5 km^{2}) 0.5%

Population (2020)
  - Total: 10,567
  - Estimate (2025): 10,646 ▲
  - Density: 17.1/sq mi (6.60/km^{2})
- Time zone: UTC−6 (Central)
  - Summer (DST): UTC−5 (CDT)
- Congressional district: 8th
- Website: www.mocounties.com/bollinger-county (Note: This page is hosted by the Missouri Association of Counties, a statewide association of county governments, rather than by the Bollinger County government.)

Bollinger County (/ˈboʊlɪŋ(ɡ)ər/ BOH-ling-(g)ər or /ˈbɒlɪndʒər/ BOL-in-jər) is a county located in the southeastern part of the U.S. state of Missouri. As of the 2020 census, the county's population was 10,567. The county seat, largest and only city, is Marble Hill. The largely rural county is supported by agriculture and construction. The county was officially organized in March 1851 from portions of Wayne, Cape Girardeau and Stoddard Counties, and named in honor of George Frederick Bollinger, an early settler.

Bollinger County is part of the Cape Girardeau, MO–IL Metropolitan Statistical Area. The county is the home of the "Missouri dinosaur" discovered at an archaeological dig near Glen Allen in 1942. Blue Pond, the deepest natural pond in Missouri, is located in the southern portion of the county.

== History ==
In fall 1799, George Frederick Bollinger, a North Carolina settler of German descent persuaded 20 other families to leave North Carolina and settle in a region immediately west of what is now Cape Girardeau, Missouri. To acquire the land, Bollinger first had to sign off a document asserting that he and his fellow settlers were all Roman Catholics. In reality, most of the group were members of the German Reformed Church and none were actually Catholic. However, Don Louis Lorimier, the Spanish Land Commandant of Cape Girardeau, had been impressed by Bollinger on an earlier visit and decided to bend the rules for him and his fellow settlers.

Lorimier's willingness to place German Reformed settlers west of Cape Girardeau is somewhat perplexing given his earlier role in placing a group of Shawnee settlers in that same location. Lorimier had earlier fled Ohio Country with his half-Shawnee wife and a band of Shawnee after a raid by men under George Rogers Clark in 1782. He eventually migrated across the Mississippi River and settled at Cape Girardeau in 1793. Later he was appointed Land Commandant at Cape Girardeau.

The Bollinger-led group of families moved into an area that became known as the "Dutch Settlement" along the Whitewater River in January 1800, crossing their wagons over the Mississippi River after an unusually cold stretch of weather had frozen the surface all the way across.

Meanwhile, ownership of the region shifted in quick succession from Spain to France and then in 1803 to the United States via the Louisiana Purchase. The change in national ownership did not bode well for the earlier Shawnee settlers. In 1825 they were removed permanently when the U.S. government enacted the treaty with the Shawnee in 1825. This treaty, whose first signatory was William Clark of the Lewis and Clark Expedition fame, required that the Shawnee move to what is now known as Shawnee Mission, Kansas, on land that had previously belonged to the Osage tribes. One of the Cherokee Trail of Tears routes passed through Sedgewickville, while another passed through Glennon and Zalma.

The region west of Cape Girardeau was organized as a county in 1851 and was named Bollinger County in honor of George Frederick Bollinger. The county seat was Dallas, renamed Marble Hill in 1865. In the next county to the west, Madison County, the settlement of Fredericktown was also named after Bollinger.

== Geography ==
According to the U.S. Census Bureau, the county has a total area of 621 square miles (1,610 km^{2}), of which 618 square miles (1,600 km^{2}) is land and 3.3 square miles (8.5 km^{2}) (0.5%) is water. The county's terrain ranges from the Mississippi Delta flatlands in the south to the Ozark Hills in the north.

=== Adjacent counties ===
- Perry County (north)
- Cape Girardeau County (east)
- Stoddard County (south)
- Wayne County (southwest)
- Madison County (northwest)

=== Major highways ===
- Route 34
- Route 51
- Route 72

=== National protected area ===
- Mark Twain National Forest (part)

== Demographics ==
Historical population
| Census | Pop. | Note | %± |
|---|---|---|---|
| 1860 | 7,371 | | — |
| 1870 | 8,162 | | 10.7% |
| 1880 | 11,130 | | 36.4% |
| 1890 | 13,121 | | 17.9% |
| 1900 | 14,650 | | 11.7% |
| 1910 | 14,576 | | −0.5% |
| 1920 | 13,909 | | −4.6% |
| 1930 | 12,269 | | −11.8% |
| 1940 | 12,898 | | 5.1% |
| 1950 | 11,019 | | −14.6% |
| 1960 | 9,167 | | −16.8% |
| 1970 | 8,820 | | −3.8% |
| 1980 | 10,301 | | 16.8% |
| 1990 | 10,619 | | 3.1% |
| 2000 | 12,029 | | 13.3% |
| 2010 | 12,363 | | 2.8% |
| 2020 | 10,567 | | −14.5% |
| 2025 (est.) | 10,646 | ▲ | 0.7% |
U.S. Decennial Census; 1790-1960 1900-1990; 1990-2000 2010-2020

=== 2020 census ===
As of the 2020 census, the county had a population of 10,567. The median age was 45.5 years. 22.0% of residents were under the age of 18 and 21.9% of residents were 65 years of age or older. For every 100 females there were 102.3 males, and for every 100 females age 18 and over there were 100.6 males age 18 and over. 0.0% of residents lived in urban areas, while 100.0% lived in rural areas.

The racial makeup of the county (see table below) was 93.33% White (non-Hispanic), 0.33% Black or African American (non-Hispanic), 0.3% American Indian and Alaska Native (non-Hispanic), 0.2% Asian (non-Hispanic), 0.03% Native Hawaiian or Pacific Islander (non-Hispanic), and 4.4% from other or multiracial groups, while Hispanic or Latino residents of any race comprised 1.5% of the population.

Bollinger County, Missouri – Racial and ethnic composition Note: the US Census treats Hispanic/Latino as an ethnic category. This table excludes Latinos from the racial categories and assigns them to a separate category. Hispanics/Latinos may be of any race.
| Race / Ethnicity (NH = Non-Hispanic) | Pop 1980 | Pop 1990 | Pop 2000 | Pop 2010 | Pop 2020 | % 1980 | % 1990 | % 2000 | % 2010 | % 2020 |
|---|---|---|---|---|---|---|---|---|---|---|
| White alone (NH) | 10,242 | 10,479 | 11,714 | 12,037 | 9,862 | 99.43% | 98.68% | 97.38% | 97.36% | 93.33% |
| Black or African American alone (NH) | 0 | 12 | 25 | 32 | 35 | 0.00% | 0.11% | 0.21% | 0.26% | 0.33% |
| Native American or Alaska Native alone (NH) | 9 | 30 | 83 | 73 | 30 | 0.09% | 0.28% | 0.69% | 0.59% | 0.28% |
| Asian alone (NH) | 7 | 28 | 25 | 26 | 20 | 0.07% | 0.26% | 0.21% | 0.21% | 0.19% |
| Native Hawaiian or Pacific Islander alone (NH) | x | x | 0 | 0 | 3 | x | x | 0.00% | 0.00% | 0.03% |
| Other race alone (NH) | 19 | 0 | 3 | 4 | 22 | 0.18% | 0.00% | 0.02% | 0.03% | 0.21% |
| Mixed race or Multiracial (NH) | x | x | 111 | 93 | 442 | x | x | 0.92% | 0.75% | 4.18% |
| Hispanic or Latino (any race) | 24 | 70 | 68 | 98 | 153 | 0.23% | 0.66% | 0.57% | 0.79% | 1.45% |
| Total | 10,301 | 10,619 | 12,029 | 12,363 | 10,567 | 100.00% | 100.00% | 100.00% | 100.00% | 100.00% |

There were 4,177 households in the county, of which 28.2% had children under the age of 18 living with them and 20.8% had a female householder with no spouse or partner present. About 26.2% of all households were made up of individuals and 12.5% had someone living alone who was 65 years of age or older.

There were 5,037 housing units, of which 17.1% were vacant. Among occupied housing units, 80.1% were owner-occupied and 19.9% were renter-occupied. The homeowner vacancy rate was 2.0% and the rental vacancy rate was 9.5%.

=== 2000 census ===
As of the 2000 census, there were 12,029 people, 4,576 households, and 3,464 families residing in the county. The population density was 19 people per square mile (7.3 people/km^{2}). There were 5,522 housing units at an average density of 9 units per square mile (3.5/km^{2}). The racial makeup of the county was 97.79% White, 0.72% Native American, 0.22% Asian, 0.21% Black or African American, 0.13% from other races, and 0.93% from two or more races. Approximately 0.57% of the population were Hispanic or Latino of any race.

There were 4,576 households, out of which 34.30% had children under the age of 18 living with them, 63.80% were married couples living together, 8.40% had a female householder with no husband present, and 24.30% were non-families. 21.60% of all households were made up of individuals, and 10.50% had someone living alone who was 65 years of age or older. The average household size was 2.59 and the average family size was 3.00.

In the county, the population was spread out, with 26.20% under the age of 18, 7.80% from 18 to 24, 26.80% from 25 to 44, 24.50% from 45 to 64, and 14.80% who were 65 years of age or older. The median age was 38 years. For every 100 females, there were 97.90 males. For every 100 females age 18 and over, there were 95.80 males.

The median income for a household in the county was $36,744, and the median income for a family was $42,948. Males had a median income of $26,078 versus $17,588 for females. The per capita income for the county was $16,387. About 10.90% of families and 13.80% of the population were below the poverty line, including 15.40% of those under age 18 and 17.40% of those age 65 or over.

The most commonly reported first ancestries in Bollinger County were 34% German, 24% United States or American, 10% Irish, 9% English, 3% Dutch, 2% French (excluding Basque), and 1% Scottish.

=== Religion ===
According to the Association of Religion Data Archives County Membership Report (2010), Bollinger County is part of the Bible Belt, with evangelical Protestantism being the most predominant religion. The most predominant denominations among residents in Bollinger County who adhere to a religion are Southern Baptists (42.43%), Roman Catholics (25.19%), and United Methodists (10.46%).

== Economy ==
Like many rural areas, the standard of living in Bollinger County is significantly lower than many other places. In 2008, the cost of living index in Bollinger County was low (76.0) compared to the U.S. average of 100. The unemployment rate in Bollinger County is also lower than the state and national levels. According to the U.S. Bureau of Labor Statistics (BLS), the October 2008 unemployment rate in the United States was 6.7 percent whereas in Missouri it was 6.5 percent. According to economic research compiled by the Federal Reserve Bank of St. Louis, the October 2008 unemployment rate in Bollinger County was 5.6 percent.

The most common industries providing employment in Bollinger County consist of manufacturing (25.5%), educational, health and social services (14.7%), construction (12.3%), and retail trade (10.8%) while other kinds of industries account for the rest (36.7%). The most common industries for males in Bollinger County are construction (20%), agriculture, forestry, fishing and/or hunting (8%), truck transportation (5%), transportation equipment (5%), metal and metal products (4%), repair and maintenance (4%), and paper (4%). The most common occupations for males in the county included driving/sales workers and truck drivers (9%), other production occupations including supervisors (8%), electrical equipment mechanics and other installation, maintenance and repair occupations including supervisors (6%), vehicle and mobile equipment mechanics, installers and repairers (6%), metal and plastic workers (6%), carpenters (5%), and hand-laborers and material movers (5%). For females, the most common industries are health care (16%), educational services (9%), apparel (8%), accommodation and food services (6%), finance and insurance (4%), public administration (4%), and metal and metal products (4%). The most common occupations for females includes other production occupations including supervisors (9%), textile, apparel and furnishings workers (8%), secretaries and administrative assistants (6%), other sales and related workers including supervisors (4%), building and grounds cleaning and maintenance occupations (4%), other office and administrative support workers including supervisors (3%), and retail sales workers not including cashiers (3%).

A majority of employees in Bollinger County (78%) receive a private wage or salary, 10% work in public or government jobs, 11% is self-employed while another 1% performs some sort of unpaid family work. A majority of workers in the county (76%) drive their own cars to work, 16% carpools, 5% works at home, 2% walks, 1% takes a bus or trolley bus, and less than 1 percent rides to work on a motorcycle or uses some other form of transportation.

=== Agriculture ===
Like it is in many rural areas, agriculture and farming plays a critical role in the economy of Bollinger County. The average size of a farm in the county is 250 acres (1 km^{2}). The average value of agricultural products sold per farm was $21,451 while the average total farm production expenses per farm was $19,413. The average market value of all machinery and equipment per farm was $36,801 and 31.69% of land in farms consisted of harvested croplands. In the county, 93.65% of all farms were operated by a family or one individual. The average age of the principal farm owner in the county was 56 years old. The average number of cattle and calves per 100 acres (0.40 km^{2}) of all land in farms in the county was 14.10 while 0.61% of all cattle and cows were used for milking. There were 33 acres (130,000 m^{2}) of land in orchards in Bollinger County. The most common crops are soybeans for beans with 20,279 acres (82 km^{2}) harvested, corn for grain with 10,057 acres (41 km^{2}) harvested, and all wheat for grain with 2,857 acres (12 km^{2}) harvested.

== Education ==
As of 2007, 70.7% of residents 25 years of age and older in Bollinger County had a high school diploma or higher as their highest educational attainment while 6.9% had a bachelor's degree or higher.

School districts including sections of the county, no matter how slight, even if the relevant schools and/or administration buildings in another county:

- Advance R-IV School District
- Delta R-V School District
- Jackson R-II School District
- Leopold R-III School District
- Meadow Heights R-II School District
- Oak Ridge R-VI School District
- Perry County 32 School District
- Woodland R-IV School District
- Zalma R-V School District

=== Public schools ===
- Leopold R-III School District – Leopold
  - Leopold Elementary School (K–6)
  - Leopold High School (7–12)
- Meadow Heights R-II School District – Patton
  - Meadow Heights Elementary School (PK–6)
  - Meadow Heights High School (7–12)
- Woodland R-IV School District – Marble Hill
  - Woodland Elementary School (K–4)
  - Woodland Middle School (5–8)
  - Woodland High School (9–12)
- Zalma R-V School District – Zalma
  - Zalma Elementary School (K–6)
  - Zalma High School (7–12)

=== Public libraries ===
- Bollinger County Library

=== Colleges and universities ===
Three Rivers College's service area includes Bollinger County.

== Crime ==
Although it is not as prevalent in Bollinger County as it is in more urban areas, the county is not immune from crime. As reported by the Bollinger County Sheriff's Department, there were no murders, six rapes, no robberies, 44 assaults, 54 burglaries, 84 thefts, and three auto thefts reported in the county in 2004–2005.

While Missouri has the notorious reputation as the state with the most methamphetamine lab busts in the United States, the number of lab incidents in Bollinger County is significantly lower and basically nonexistent when compared to the regional and statewide average. According to the Missouri State Highway Patrol, there were no methamphetamine lab busts reported in Bollinger County in 2008.

A growing concern among residents in Bollinger County, however, is underage drinking and driving while intoxicated.

== Climate and weather ==
Missouri generally has a humid continental climate with cool to cold winters and long, hot summers. Due to its location in the interior United States, Missouri often experiences extremes in temperatures. Not having either large mountains or oceans nearby to moderate its temperature, its climate is alternately influenced by air from the cold Arctic and the hot and humid Gulf of Mexico. In the southern part of the state, particularly in the Bootheel, the climate borders on a humid subtropical climate. Therefore, Bollinger County, which is located above the Bootheel, can be said to have more of a humid continental climate sometimes influenced by a humid subtropical climate. Average temperatures in Bollinger County range from 22 °F (−6 °C) in January to 89 °F (32 °C) in July. According to Weather.com, some weather facts about Bollinger County include the following:

- On average, the warmest month in Bollinger County is July.
- The highest recorded temperature in Bollinger County was 108 °F (42 °C) in 1954.
- January is the average coolest month in Bollinger County.
- The lowest recorded temperature in Bollinger County was −27 °F (−33 °C) in 1951.
- The maximum average precipitation in Bollinger County occurs in March (4.91 inches).

The historical area-adjusted tornado activity in Bollinger County is near the Missouri state average but is 1.7 times above the U.S. national average. During the 1925 Tri-State Tornado, Bollinger County was only mildly impacted compared to many other locations, although 32 children were injured in two separate schools, no fatalities were reported in the county. Tornadoes in the county have caused one fatality and 24 injuries recorded between 1950 and 2004. On April 27, 2002, an F3 tornado with maximum wind speeds of 158-206 mph killed a teenage boy in between Hahn and Marble Hill and injured 16 people and caused $4 million in damages.

=== 2023 tornado ===
In the early morning hours of April 5, 2023, an EF2 tornado caused damage in Glen Allen and Grassy, killing 5 people and injuring multiple people.

== Politics ==
=== Local ===
The Republican Party completely controls politics at the local level in Bollinger County, holding every elected office in the county.

Bollinger County, Missouri

Elected countywide officials
| Assessor | Ronda Elfrink | Republican |
| Circuit Clerk | Dana Mayfield | Republican |
| County Clerk | Brittany Hovis | Republican |
| Collector | Sonya Fulton | Republican |
| Commissioner (presiding) | Leo Arnzen | Republican |
| Commissioner (district 1) | Tim Shelby | Republican |
| Commissioner (district 2) | Chad Hulvey | Republican |
| Coroner | Calvin Troxell | Republican |
| Prosecuting Attorney | Stephen Gray | Republican |
| Public Administrator | Larry L. Welker | Republican |
| Recorder | Dana Fulbright | Republican |
| Sheriff | Casey Graham | Republican |
| Treasurer | Scott Minson | Republican |

=== State ===
Past Gubernatorial Elections Results
| Year | Republican | Democratic | Third Parties |
|---|---|---|---|
| 2024 | 86.57% 5,247 | 11.42% 692 | 2.01% 122 |
| 2020 | 85.12% 5,063 | 13.00% 773 | 1.88% 112 |
| 2016 | 72.22% 4,051 | 25.25% 1,416 | 2.53% 142 |
| 2012 | 57.48% 3,114 | 39.53% 2,142 | 2.99% 162 |
| 2008 | 56.05% 3,232 | 42.06% 2,425 | 1.89% 109 |
| 2004 | 67.25% 3,902 | 31.76% 1,843 | 0.98% 57 |
| 2000 | 61.76% 3,190 | 36.98% 1,910 | 1.26% 65 |
| 1996 | 47.96% 2,372 | 51.11% 2,528 | 0.93% 46 |
| 1992 | 55.01% 2,867 | 44.99% 2,345 | 0.00% 0 |
| 1988 | 63.63% 2,930 | 36.31% 1,672 | 0.07% 3 |
| 1984 | 59.10% 2,754 | 40.90% 1,906 | 0.00% 0 |
| 1980 | 51.93% 2,641 | 48.01% 2,442 | 0.06% 3 |
| 1976 | 48.68% 2,338 | 51.32% 2,465 | 0.00% 0 |
| 1972 | 50.62% 2,521 | 49.14% 2,447 | 0.24% 12 |
| 1968 | 45.55% 2,021 | 54.45% 2,416 | 0.00% 0 |
| 1964 | 44.21% 2,130 | 55.79% 2,688 | 0.00% 0 |
| 1960 | 55.02% 2,637 | 44.98% 2,156 | 0.00% 0 |

All of Bollinger County is a part of Missouri's 145th District in the Missouri House of Representatives and is currently represented by Rick Francis (R-Perryville). Francis was reelected to a third term in 2020.

Missouri House of Representatives – District 145 – Bollinger County (2020)
| Party | Candidate | Votes | % | ±% |
|---|---|---|---|---|
| Republican | Rick Francis | 5,061 | 86.44% | +0.76 |
| Democratic | Mike Lindley | 794 | 13.56% | −0.76 |

Missouri House of Representatives – District 145 – Bollinger County (2018)
| Party | Candidate | Votes | % | ±% |
|---|---|---|---|---|
| Republican | Rick Francis | 4,056 | 85.68% | +3.51 |
| Democratic | Ronald G. Pember | 678 | 14.32% | −0.71 |

All of Bollinger County is a part of Missouri's 27th District in the Missouri Senate and is currently represented by Holly Thompson Rehder (R-Sikeston).

Missouri Senate – District 27 – Bollinger County (2020)
| Party | Candidate | Votes | % | ±% |
|---|---|---|---|---|
| Republican | Holly Rehder | 4,942 | 84.93% | +4.44 |
| Democratic | Donnie Owens | 877 | 15.07% | −4.44 |

Missouri Senate – District 27 – Bollinger County (2016)
| Party | Candidate | Votes | % | ±% |
|---|---|---|---|---|
| Republican | Wayne Wallingford | 4,370 | 80.49% | −19.51 |
| Democratic | Donnie Owens | 1,059 | 19.51% | +19.51 |

=== Federal ===
All of Bollinger County is included in Missouri's 8th Congressional District and is currently represented by Jason Smith (R-Salem) in the U.S. House of Representatives. Smith was elected to a fifth term in 2020 over Democratic challenger Kathy Ellis.

U.S. House of Representatives – Missouri’s 8th Congressional District – Bollinger County (2020)
| Party | Candidate | Votes | % | ±% |
|---|---|---|---|---|
| Republican | Jason Smith | 5,020 | 85.32% | +2.51 |
| Democratic | Kathy Ellis | 791 | 13.44% | −2.52 |
| Libertarian | Tom Schmitz | 73 | 1.24% | +0.01 |

U.S. House of Representatives – Missouri's 8th Congressional District – Bollinger County (2018)
| Party | Candidate | Votes | % | ±% |
|---|---|---|---|---|
| Republican | Jason Smith | 3,965 | 82.81% | +0.90 |
| Democratic | Kathy Ellis | 764 | 15.96% | +0.69 |
| Libertarian | Jonathan L. Shell | 59 | 1.23% | −1.59 |

Bollinger County, along with the rest of the state of Missouri, is represented in the U.S. Senate by Josh Hawley (R-Columbia) and Roy Blunt (R-Strafford).

U.S. Senate – Class I – Bollinger County (2018)
| Party | Candidate | Votes | % | ±% |
|---|---|---|---|---|
| Republican | Josh Hawley | 3,486 | 79.76% | +23.81 |
| Democratic | Claire McCaskill | 886 | 18.37% | −20.30 |
| Libertarian | Japheth Campbell | 36 | 0.75% | −4.63 |
| Independent | Craig O'Dear | 32 | 0.66% | |
| Green | Jo Crain | 22 | 0.46% | +0.46 |

Blunt was elected to a second term in 2016 over then-Missouri Secretary of State Jason Kander.

U.S. Senate - Class III - Bollinger County (2016)
| Party | Candidate | Votes | % | ±% |
|---|---|---|---|---|
| Republican | Roy Blunt | 4,016 | 71.61% | +1.32 |
| Democratic | Jason Kander | 1,379 | 24.59% | −0.01 |
| Libertarian | Jonathan Dine | 99 | 1.77% | +0.86 |
| Constitution | Fred Ryman | 57 | 1.02% | −1.46 |
| Green | Johnathan McFarland | 57 | 1.02% | +1.02 |

==== Political culture ====
United States presidential election results for Bollinger County, Missouri
| Year | Republican | | Democratic | | Third party(ies) | |
| Year | No. | % | No. | % | No. | % |
|---|---|---|---|---|---|---|
| 1888 | 1,090 | 45.40% | 1,302 | 54.23% | 9 | 0.37% |
| 1892 | 1,145 | 45.19% | 1,338 | 52.80% | 51 | 2.01% |
| 1896 | 1,272 | 46.05% | 1,485 | 53.77% | 5 | 0.18% |
| 1900 | 1,515 | 49.00% | 1,533 | 49.58% | 44 | 1.42% |
| 1904 | 1,587 | 53.26% | 1,355 | 45.47% | 38 | 1.28% |
| 1908 | 1,593 | 50.30% | 1,517 | 47.90% | 57 | 1.80% |
| 1912 | 1,100 | 35.60% | 1,512 | 48.93% | 478 | 15.47% |
| 1916 | 1,624 | 50.05% | 1,538 | 47.40% | 83 | 2.56% |
| 1920 | 2,869 | 57.97% | 2,019 | 40.80% | 61 | 1.23% |
| 1924 | 2,204 | 50.21% | 2,075 | 47.27% | 111 | 2.53% |
| 1928 | 3,014 | 62.20% | 1,824 | 37.64% | 8 | 0.17% |
| 1932 | 2,411 | 44.29% | 2,994 | 55.00% | 39 | 0.72% |
| 1936 | 2,988 | 50.91% | 2,816 | 47.98% | 65 | 1.11% |
| 1940 | 3,415 | 57.55% | 2,511 | 42.32% | 8 | 0.13% |
| 1944 | 2,850 | 60.72% | 1,841 | 39.22% | 3 | 0.06% |
| 1948 | 2,187 | 51.25% | 2,075 | 48.63% | 5 | 0.12% |
| 1952 | 3,060 | 58.34% | 2,182 | 41.60% | 3 | 0.06% |
| 1956 | 2,845 | 56.56% | 2,185 | 43.44% | 0 | 0.00% |
| 1960 | 2,886 | 59.86% | 1,935 | 40.14% | 0 | 0.00% |
| 1964 | 2,125 | 43.22% | 2,792 | 56.78% | 0 | 0.00% |
| 1968 | 2,283 | 50.08% | 1,693 | 37.14% | 583 | 12.79% |
| 1972 | 3,069 | 62.80% | 1,818 | 37.20% | 0 | 0.00% |
| 1976 | 2,113 | 43.46% | 2,740 | 56.36% | 9 | 0.19% |
| 1980 | 2,863 | 56.08% | 2,160 | 42.31% | 82 | 1.61% |
| 1984 | 2,778 | 59.09% | 1,923 | 40.91% | 0 | 0.00% |
| 1988 | 2,710 | 58.94% | 1,883 | 40.95% | 5 | 0.11% |
| 1992 | 2,289 | 42.68% | 2,150 | 40.09% | 924 | 17.23% |
| 1996 | 2,420 | 47.95% | 2,044 | 40.50% | 583 | 11.55% |
| 2000 | 3,487 | 65.87% | 1,692 | 31.96% | 115 | 2.17% |
| 2004 | 4,102 | 69.58% | 1,754 | 29.75% | 39 | 0.66% |
| 2008 | 3,972 | 68.67% | 1,690 | 29.22% | 122 | 2.11% |
| 2012 | 4,095 | 75.05% | 1,213 | 22.23% | 148 | 2.71% |
| 2016 | 4,827 | 85.04% | 705 | 12.42% | 144 | 2.54% |
| 2020 | 5,167 | 86.36% | 750 | 12.54% | 66 | 1.10% |
| 2024 | 5,365 | 87.08% | 756 | 12.27% | 40 | 0.65% |

Bollinger County is a Republican stronghold at the presidential level. No Democratic nominee has won Bollinger County since Jimmy Carter in 1976. Since then, voters in the county have consistently backed Republican presidential nominees.

=== Missouri presidential preference primaries ===
==== 2020 ====
The 2020 presidential primaries for both the Democratic and Republican parties were held in Missouri on March 10. On the Democratic side, former Vice President Joe Biden (D-Delaware) both won statewide and carried Bollinger County by a wide margin. Biden went on to defeat President Donald Trump in the general election.

Missouri Democratic Presidential Primary – Bollinger County (2020)
| Party | Candidate | Votes | % | ±% |
|---|---|---|---|---|
| Democratic | Joe Biden | 295 | 63.99 | |
| Democratic | Bernie Sanders | 146 | 31.67 | |
| Democratic | Tulsi Gabbard | 3 | 0.65 | |
| Democratic | Others/Uncommitted | 17 | 3.69 | |

Incumbent President Donald Trump (R-Florida) faced a primary challenge from former Massachusetts Governor Bill Weld, but won both Bollinger County and statewide by overwhelming margins.

Missouri Republican Presidential Primary – Bollinger County (2020)
| Party | Candidate | Votes | % | ±% |
|---|---|---|---|---|
| Republican | Donald Trump | 1,085 | 98.64 | |
| Republican | Bill Weld | 1 | 0.09 | |
| Republican | Others/Uncommitted | 14 | 1.27 | |

==== 2016 ====
The 2016 presidential primaries for both the Republican and Democratic parties were held in Missouri on March 15. Businessman Donald Trump (R-New York) narrowly won the state overall and carried a plurality of the vote in Bollinger County. He went on to win the presidency.

Missouri Republican Presidential Primary – Bollinger County (2016)
| Party | Candidate | Votes | % | ±% |
|---|---|---|---|---|
| Republican | Donald Trump | 1,272 | 47.61 | |
| Republican | Ted Cruz | 1,111 | 41.58 | |
| Republican | John Kasich | 141 | 5.28 | |
| Republican | Marco Rubio | 98 | 3.67 | |
| Republican | Others/Uncommitted | 50 | 1.87 | |

On the Democratic side, former Secretary of State Hillary Clinton (D-New York) narrowly won statewide and carried a majority of the vote in Bollinger County.

Missouri Democratic Presidential Primary – Bollinger County (2016)
| Party | Candidate | Votes | % | ±% |
|---|---|---|---|---|
| Democratic | Hillary Clinton | 242 | 53.78 | |
| Democratic | Bernie Sanders | 203 | 45.11 | |
| Democratic | Others/Uncommitted | 5 | 1.11 | |

==== 2012 ====
The 2012 Missouri Republican Presidential Primary's results were nonbinding on the state's national convention delegates. Voters in Bollinger County supported former U.S. Senator Rick Santorum (R-Pennsylvania), who finished first in the state at large, but eventually lost the nomination to former Governor Mitt Romney (R-Massachusetts). Delegates to the congressional district and state conventions were chosen at a county caucus, which selected a delegation favoring Santorum. Incumbent President Barack Obama easily won the Missouri Democratic Primary and renomination. He defeated Romney in the general election.

==== 2008 ====
In 2008, the Missouri Republican Presidential Primary was closely contested, with Senator John McCain (R-Arizona) prevailing and eventually winning the nomination. However, former Governor Mike Huckabee (R-Arkansas) won a plurality in Bollinger County.

Missouri Republican Presidential Primary – Bollinger County (2008)
| Party | Candidate | Votes | % | ±% |
|---|---|---|---|---|
| Republican | Mike Huckabee | 657 | 39.72 | |
| Republican | John McCain | 518 | 31.32 | |
| Republican | Mitt Romney | 384 | 23.22 | |
| Republican | Ron Paul | 65 | 3.93 | |
| Republican | Others/Uncommitted | 30 | 1.80 | |

Then-Senator Hillary Clinton (D-New York) received more votes than any candidate from either party in Bollinger County during the 2008 presidential primary. Despite initial reports that Clinton had won Missouri, Barack Obama (D-Illinois), also a Senator at the time, narrowly defeated her statewide and later became that year's Democratic nominee, going on to win the presidency.

Missouri Democratic Presidential Primary – Bollinger County (2008)
| Party | Candidate | Votes | % | ±% |
|---|---|---|---|---|
| Democratic | Hillary Clinton | 971 | 74.12 | |
| Democratic | Barack Obama | 293 | 22.37 | |
| Democratic | Others/Uncommitted | 46 | 3.51 | |

== Attractions ==
A part of Missouri's River Heritage Region, Bollinger County has several historical points of interest:

- The Bollinger County Museum of Natural History, located in Marble Hill, houses a growing collection of natural history specimens and Native American artifacts from Missouri and other artifacts from around the world. The museum is home to "the Missouri dinosaur"
- The Massey Log House, built in 1869, located in Marble Hill
- The Alma Fisher One-Room School in Marble Hill
- The Cat Ranch Art Guild, a non-profit organization dedicated to promoting the arts in the county, is located in Marble Hill. It was started in memory of Tom Runnels, a local artist, sculptor and writer who died of brain cancer on September 3, 2000. The Guild's name is taken from Tom and his wife Saundra Runnels's property, which is called The Cat Ranch.
- St. John's Catholic Church in Leopold has one of the oldest pipe organs west of the Mississippi River.

== Communities ==
=== City ===
- Marble Hill

=== Villages ===
- Glen Allen
- Sedgewickville
- Zalma

=== Unincorporated communities ===
- Alliance
- Arab
- Bessville
- Buchanan
- Burg
- Castor
- Crump
- Dongola
- Drum
- Gipsy
- Glennon
- Grassy
- Greenbrier
- Hahn
- Hurricane
- Huskey
- Laflin
- Leopold
- Lixville
- Lodge
- Mayfield
- Patton
- Precinct
- Sank
- Scheperville
- Scopus
- Shrum
- Sturdivant
- Tallent

=== Townships ===
Bollinger County is divided into eight townships:

- Crooked Creek
- Filmore
- Liberty
- Lorance
- Scopus
- Union
- Wayne
- Whitewater

== Notable people ==
- Madison Roswell Smith, U.S. ambassador to Haiti (1912–1914) and U.S. representative (D-Missouri) (1907–1909)
- James Fulton Zimmerman, educator and historian
- Orville Zimmerman, U.S. representative (D-Missouri) (1935–1948)
