= Marble Hill, Missouri =

- City
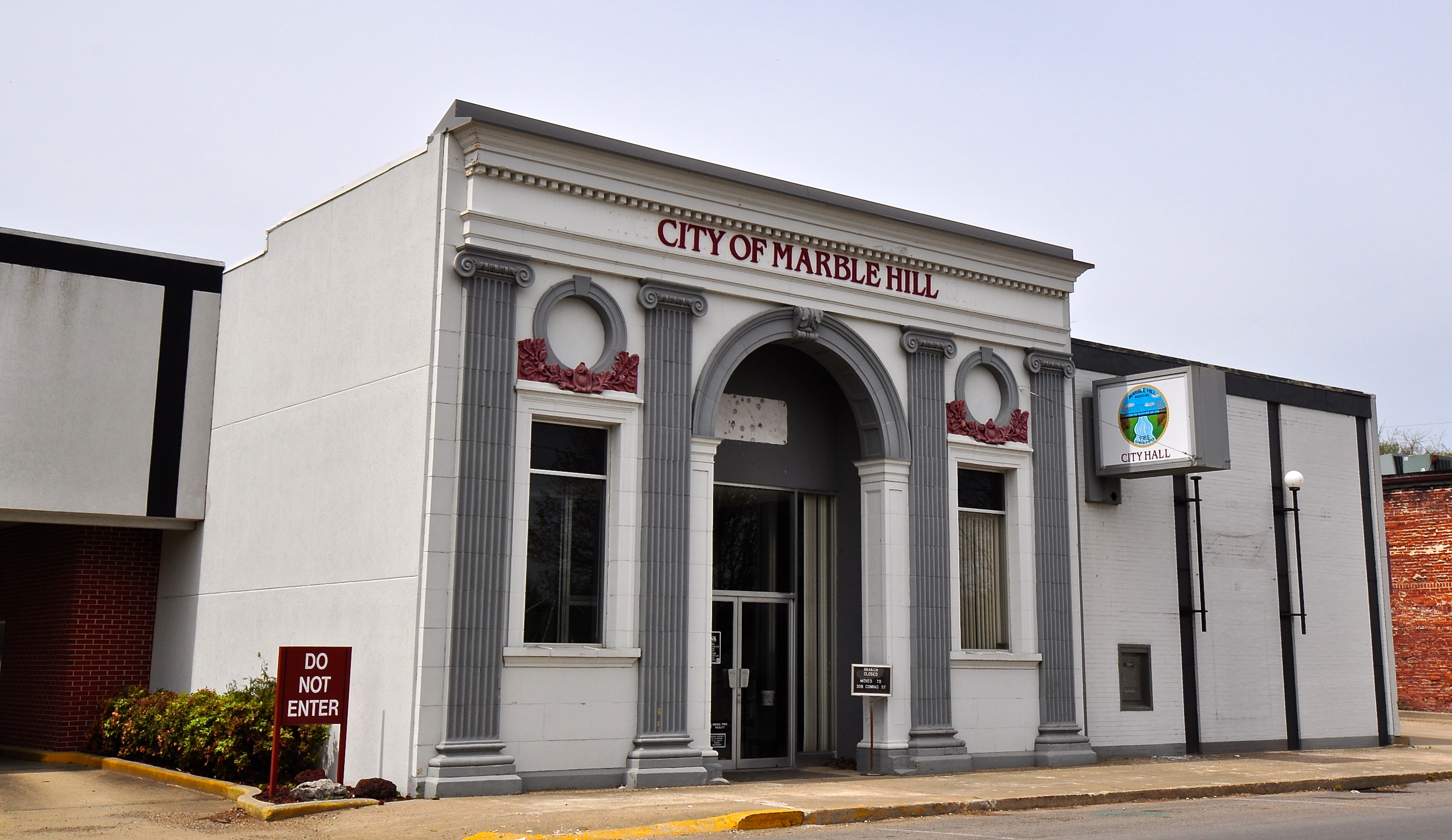
- Downtown Marble Hill Bollinger County Courthouse City Hall Wicecarver's Store

- Location of Marble Hill, Missouri
- Coordinates: 37°18′18″N 89°58′51″W
- Country: United States
- State: Missouri
- County: Bollinger

Government
  - Type: Mayor-Council
  - Mayor: Trey Wiginton

Area
  - Total: 1.66 sq mi (4.30 km^{2})
  - Land: 1.65 sq mi (4.28 km^{2})
  - Water: 0.0039 sq mi (0.01 km^{2})
- Elevation: 400 ft (120 m)

Population (2020)
  - Total: 1,388
  - Density: 839.0/sq mi (323.93/km^{2})
- Time zone: UTC-6 (Central (CST))
  - Summer (DST): UTC-5 (CDT)
- ZIP code: 63764
- Area code: 573
- FIPS code: 29-45848
- GNIS feature ID =: 2395000
- Website: cityofmarblehill.org

Marble Hill is a fourth-class city in central Bollinger County in Southeast Missouri, United States. It is well known for its yearly cooking competition located at the park. Located at the intersection of State Highways 34 and 51, it is the largest city in Bollinger and serves as the county seat. The population was 1,388 at the 2020 census. The city was officially organized in July 1851 and is named after the marble-like rock, limestone, formations found in the area.

Marble Hill is part of the Cape Girardeau-Jackson metropolitan area.

== History ==
The area that would eventually become known as Marble Hill was established in 1842 as New California. Nine years later, it was renamed Dallas in 1851. As the area grew over the years, the First Baptist Church was built in 1856 near the oldest cemetery in Marble Hill. In 1862, the courthouse and town of Dallas was raided by Colonel S.D. Kitchen, along with 120 Confederate soldiers. Finally, in 1868, the name of the town was changed again, this time to Marble Hill, to prevent confusion with the already existing Dallas County.

A year after the name change, a man by the name of Eli Lutes laid out what would become known as Lutesville. Lutes offered 10 acres (40,000 m^{2}) to the railroad for a depot location which would be used as a shipping and trading point. Disputes with leaders of Marble Hill persuaded the railroad to relocate their route through Lutesville instead.

In 1880, Will Mayfield College moved to Marble Hill from Smithville. It remained in operation there until its closing in 1934. In 1893, Wicecarver's Store was built across from the courthouse where the steps in front were formerly used for mounting horses and carriages. Between 1904 and 1905, the Mineral Well was dug on the courthouse square and was used until 1947–1948. The year 1932 marked the last passenger line on the Belmont Branch of the St. Louis & Iron Mountain Railroad. The railroad company ceased operations through Lutesville in 1973. In August 1953, an artesian well was discovered approximately 1,800 feet (550 m) deep while drilling for oil in the area. In 1973, voters approved a measure to build what would become known as Twin City Airpark Airport.

It was suggested in 1985 that the towns of Marble Hill and Lutesville should merge. Lutesville, which had been founded in 1869 and later became the main business and shipping center for the area, merged with Marble Hill and maintained the name of Marble Hill because it was the current county seat. The portion of Marble Hill that was the former city of Lutesville is the portion southwest of Crooked Creek. Crooked Creek has flooded the town on many occasions.

== Education ==
Of adults 25 years of age and older in Marble Hill, 40.6% possess a high school diploma, 5.0% have a bachelor's degree, and 3.3% holds a post-graduate/professional degree as their highest educational attainment.

=== Public Schools ===
The Woodland R-IV School District serves the educational needs of most of the city's residents and nearby throughout central Bollinger County. According to the Missouri Department of Elementary & Secondary Education, there is one elementary school, one middle school, and one senior high school in the district. During the 2008–2009 school year, there was a total of 928 students and 79 certified staff members enrolled in the Woodland R-IV School District. The school colors are red and black and its mascot is the cardinal. Athletics at the school consist of boys' and girls' basketball and cross country; boys' baseball; girls' volleyball and softball; and cheerleading.

- Woodland Elementary School (K-04)
- Woodland Middle School (05-08)
- Woodland High School (09-12)

=== Public library ===
Marble Hill has a public library, the Bollinger County Library.

== Geography ==
Marble Hill is located just north of the confluence of Hurricane Creek and Crooked Creek. Lutesville lies to the south across Crooked Creek. Missouri routes 34 and 51 pass through the community.

According to the United States Census Bureau, the city has a total area of 1.65 square miles (4.27 km^{2}), of which 1.64 square miles (4.25 km^{2}) is land and 0.01 square miles (0.03 km^{2}) is water.

== Climate ==
Marble Hill has a humid subtropical climate (Köppen Cfa). Summers are hot and humid, while winters are cool. Precipitation is abundant with an annual average of 48.58 in (1,234 mm); the spring and autumn months typically are the wettest parts of the year.

Climate data for Marble Hill, Missouri
Month	Jan	Feb	Mar	Apr	May	Jun	Jul	Aug	Sep	Oct	Nov	Dec	Year
Mean daily maximum °F (°C)	43 (6)	50 (10)	60 (16)	70 (21)	78 (26)	85 (29)	89 (32)	88 (31)	82 (28)	72 (22)	58 (14)	47 (8)	69 (20)
Mean daily minimum °F (°C)	22 (−6)	26 (−3)	35 (2)	43 (6)	53 (12)	61 (16)	66 (19)	63 (17)	56 (13)	43 (6)	35 (2)	26 (−3)	44 (7)
Average precipitation inches (mm)	3.23 (82)	3.18 (81)	4.91 (125)	4.58 (116)	4.59 (117)	4.21 (107)	4.20 (107)	3.60 (91)	3.54 (90)	3.37 (86)	4.85 (123)	4.32 (110)	48.58 (1,234)

== Demographics ==
Historical population
Census	Pop.	Note	%±
1880	265		—
1890	257		−3.0%
1900	295		14.8%
1910	313		6.1%
1920	332		6.1%
1930	421		26.8%
1940	421		0.0%
1950	454		7.8%
1960	497		9.5%
1970	589		18.5%
1980	601		2.0%
1990	1,447		140.8%
2000	1,502		3.8%
2010	1,477		−1.7%
2020	1,388		−6.0%
U.S. Decennial Census

=== 2010 census ===
As of the census of 2010, there were 1,477 people, 604 households, and 369 families residing in the city. The population density was 900.6 inhabitants per square mile (347.7/km^{2}). There were 705 housing units at an average density of 429.9 per square mile (166.0/km^{2}). The racial makeup of the city was 96.41% White, 1.02% Native American, 0.81% Asian, 0.34% from other races, and 1.42% from two or more races. Hispanic or Latino of any race were 1.76% of the population.

There were 604 households, of which 30.8% had children under the age of 18 living with them, 41.2% were married couples living together, 15.9% had a female householder with no husband present, 4.0% had a male householder with no wife present, and 38.9% were non-families. 33.6% of all households were made up of individuals, and 16% had someone living alone who was 65 years of age or older. The average household size was 2.32 and the average family size was 2.93.

The median age in the city was 39.8 years. 24.8% of residents were under the age of 18; 8.9% were between the ages of 18 and 24; 20.5% were from 25 to 44; 24.7% were from 45 to 64; and 20.9% were 65 years of age or older. The gender makeup of the city was 43.4% male and 56.6% female.

=== 2000 census ===
As of the census of 2000, there were 1,502 people, 642 households, and 414 families residing in the city. The population density was 935.9 inhabitants per square mile (361.4/km^{2}). There were 719 housing units at an average density of 448.0 per square mile (173.0/km^{2}). The racial makeup of the city was 95.67% White, 0.13% African American, 1.40% Native American, 0.80% Asian, 0.13% from other races, and 1.86% from two or more races. Hispanic or Latino of any race were 0.80% of the population. Among the major first ancestries reported in Marble Hill are 16.2% German, 14.5% English, 14.4% Irish, 11.4% American, 5.4% Dutch, and 3.4% French.

There were 642 households, out of which 31.8% had children under the age of 18 living with them, 46.6% were married couples living together, 15.6% had a female householder with no husband present, and 35.5% were non-families. 32.6% of all households were made up of individuals, and 17.0% had someone living alone who was 65 years of age or older. The average household size was 2.31 and the average family size was 2.93.

In the city the population was spread out, with 27.2% under the age of 18, 9.1% from 18 to 24, 24.8% from 25 to 44, 20.0% from 45 to 64, and 18.9% who were 65 years of age or older. The median age was 36 years. For every 100 females, there were 83.4 males. For every 100 females age 18 and over, there were 78.8 males.

The median income for a household in the city was $22,163, and the median income for a family was $29,871. Males had a median income of $25,093 versus $16,161 for females. The per capita income for the city was $12,857. About 17.4% of families and 19.6% of the population were below the poverty line, including 24.4% of those under age 18 and 22.1% of those age 65 or over.

== Government ==
=== City/Local ===
The City of Marble Hill is governed by Mayor Trey Wiginton and a four-member city council.

=== State ===
Marble Hill is a part of Missouri's 151st Legislative District and is currently represented by Representative Herman Morse R-Dexter. In the Missouri Senate, State Senator Holly Rehder R-Scott City represents Marble Hill as part of Missouri's 27th Senatorial District.

=== Federal ===
Marble Hill is included in Missouri's 8th Congressional District and is currently represented in the U.S. House of Representatives by Jason T. Smith (R-Cape Girardeau).

== See also ==
- International Hat Company
