= Goose Creek =

Goose Creek may refer to the following places:

== Water bodies ==
- Goose Creek (Rio Grande), a tributary to the Rio Grande running by the Wagon Wheel Gap Hot Springs Resort near Creede, Colorado
- Tiber Creek, formerly known as Goose Creek, in the District of Columbia
- Goose Creek (Florida), the site of an American Civil War skirmish
- Goose Creek (Idaho), a tributary of Little Salmon River
- Goose Creek (Snake River) in Idaho, Utah, and Nevada
- Goose Creek (Iowa River), a river in Iowa
- Goose Creek (Louisville, Kentucky), a tributary of the Ohio River
- Goose Creek (Oneida, Kentucky), a tributary of the Kentucky River
- Goose Creek (River Raisin), in Michigan
- Goose Creek (Bear Creek), a stream in Missouri
- Goose Creek (Big Creek), a stream in Missouri
- Goose Creek (Cedar Creek), a stream in Missouri
- Goose Creek (Fourche a Du Clos), a stream in Missouri
- Goose Creek (Indian Creek), a stream in Missouri
- Goose Creek (Saline Creek), a stream in Missouri
- Goose Creek (Shoal Creek), a stream in Missouri
- Toms River, formerly known as Goose Creek, in New Jersey
- Goose Creek (North Carolina), a tidal tributary of the Pamlico River
  - Goose Creek State Park in North Carolina
- Goose Creek (Rocky River tributary), a stream in Mecklenburg and Union Counties, North Carolina
- Goose Creek (Ohio), a stream in Preble County
- Goose Creek (Pennsylvania), a stream in Chester County
- Goose Creek (Potomac River), in northern Virginia, the site of an 1863 skirmish during the Gettysburg Campaign of the American Civil War
- Goose Creek (Wyoming), river in Sheridan County, Wyoming
- Goose Creek (Manitoba, Churchill)
- Goose Creek (Manitoba, Nelson), a tributary to the Nelson River in northern Manitoba, Canada

== Communities ==
- Goose Creek, Kentucky, the incorporated city within Louisville Metro
- Goose Creek, Louisville, a neighborhood within Louisville proper
- Goose Creek, South Carolina, located just outside Charleston; also the location of a U.S. Navy Weapons Station
- Goose Creek, Texas, a former town in Texas that became part of modern Baytown

== Other ==
- Goose Creek Symphony, an American rock band
- Goose Creek Oil Field, one of major oil fields that created the Texas Oil Boom
- Goose Creek Correctional Center, an Alaskan state prison
