= John H. Raney =

American politician

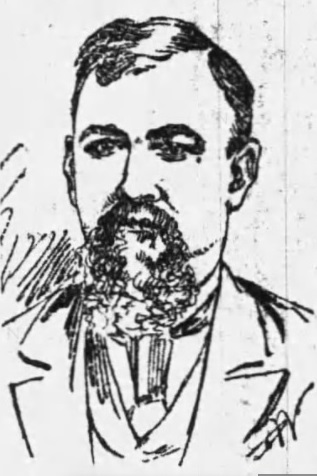
- St. Louis Globe-Democrat, November 9, 1894

Member of the U.S. House of Representatives from Missouri's 13th district
- In office March 4, 1895 – March 3, 1897
- Preceded by: Robert W. Fyan
- Succeeded by: Edward Robb

Personal details
- Born: John Henry Raney; September 28, 1849 Gravelton, Missouri, U.S.
- Died: January 23, 1928 (aged 78) near Patterson, Missouri, U.S.
- Resting place: Masonic Cemetery, Piedmont, Missouri, U.S.
- Party: Republican
- Profession: Politician, lawyer, judge

John Henry Raney (September 28, 1849 – January 23, 1928) was a U.S. Representative from Missouri.

Born in Gravelton, Missouri, Raney attended Union School, Des Arc, Missouri, and Woods School, Virginia Settlement, Missouri.He studied law and served as judge of the county court of Wayne County in 1880–1882. He was admitted to the bar in 1881 and commenced practice at Greenville, Missouri. He also engaged in agricultural pursuits and as a stock raiser and served as prosecuting attorney of Wayne County in 1882–1888. He was an unsuccessful candidate for election in 1888 to the Missouri House of Representatives, but served as a delegate to all Republican State conventions in 1884–1927 as well as a delegate to the Republican National Convention in 1892. He was one of the board of regents of the State normal school, Cape Girardeau, Missouri from 1893 to 1895.

Raney was elected as a Republican to the Fifty-fourth Congress (March 4, 1895 – March 3, 1897) but was an unsuccessful candidate for reelection in 1896 to the Fifty-fifth Congress. He resumed the practice of law in Piedmont, Missouri. He was an unsuccessful candidate for circuit judge of the twenty-first judicial district in 1898. He served as again prosecuting attorney of Wayne County in 1921 and 1922. He died near Patterson, Missouri, January 23, 1928 and was interred in the Masonic Cemetery, Piedmont, Missouri.

U.S. House of Representatives
Preceded by Robert W. Fyan	Member of the U.S. House of Representatives from Missouri's 13th congressional district 1895–1897	Succeeded by Edward Robb
