= Holliday Creek (Missouri) =

Stream in the U.S. state of Missouri

- Location of Holliday Creek in Missouri

Location
- Country: United States
- State: Missouri
- County: Wayne County

Physical characteristics
- Mouth: St. Francis River (within Lake Wappapello)

Basin features
- Progression: St. Francis River → Mississippi River → Gulf of Mexico
- River system: St. Francis River
- Named for: Hiram Holliday, local lumber businessman

Holliday Creek is a stream in Wayne County in the U.S. state of Missouri. It is a tributary to the St. Francis River within Lake Wappapello.

The stream headwaters arise north of Missouri Route E west of the community of Burbank at 37°09′28″N 90°23′33″W. The stream flows southwest passing southeast of Greenville and enters the waters of Lake Wappapello. The confluence with the St. Francis prior to the lake formation was just southeast of the US Route 67 bridge at 37°05′42″N 90°26′56″W.

Holliday Creek has the name of Hiram Holliday, a businessperson in the local lumber industry.

== See also ==
- List of rivers of Missouri
