= McCabe Creek (Missouri) =

Stream in the American state of Missouri

McCabe Creek is a stream in Wayne County in the U.S. state of Missouri. It is a tributary to Bear Creek.

== Geography ==
The stream headwaters are in northern Wayne County south of Missouri Route 34 to the east of Clubb (at 37°12′42″N 90°17′27″W) and the stream flows south and southwest to its confluence with Bear Creek just southwest of the community of Hiram adjacent to Missouri Route C (at 37°10′00″N 90°18′48″W).

== Name ==
McCabe Creek has the name of a pioneer citizen.

== See also ==
- List of rivers of Missouri
