= Goose Creek (Bear Creek tributary) =

Stream in the US state of Missouri

Goose Creek is a stream in northeastern Wayne County in the U.S. state of Missouri. It is a tributary of Bear Creek.

The stream headwaters arise just north of the Mark Twain National Forest south of the community of Burbank (at 37°08′03″N 90°22′08″W) and it flows northeast to east roughly parallel to Missouri Route E. The stream confluence with Bear Creek is about 1.5 miles south of the community of Hiram and two miles west of the community of Lowndes. The confluence is at 37°09′15″N 90°18′17″W.

Goose Creek was so named on account of wild geese near its course.

== See also ==
- List of rivers of Missouri
