= Cedar Bay (Missouri) =

Stream in Wayne County, Missouri, U.S.

Coordinates: 37°04′44″N 90°42′47″W

Cedar Bay is a stream in Wayne County in the U.S. state of Missouri. It is a tributary of the Black River.

The stream headwaters arise about two miles south of Piedmont (at ) and the stream flows south and then southwest to its confluence with the Black River just north of Leeper (at ) at an altitude of 430 feet (130 m). Missouri Route 34 and Missouri Route 49 run parallel to the stream channel for its entire course.

Cedar Bay, historically called "Cedar Bay Branch", was so named on account of cedar timber near its course.

== See also ==
- List of rivers of Missouri
