= Aley Mountain =

Mountain in Missouri, United States

Coordinates: 37°13′23″N 90°36′51″W

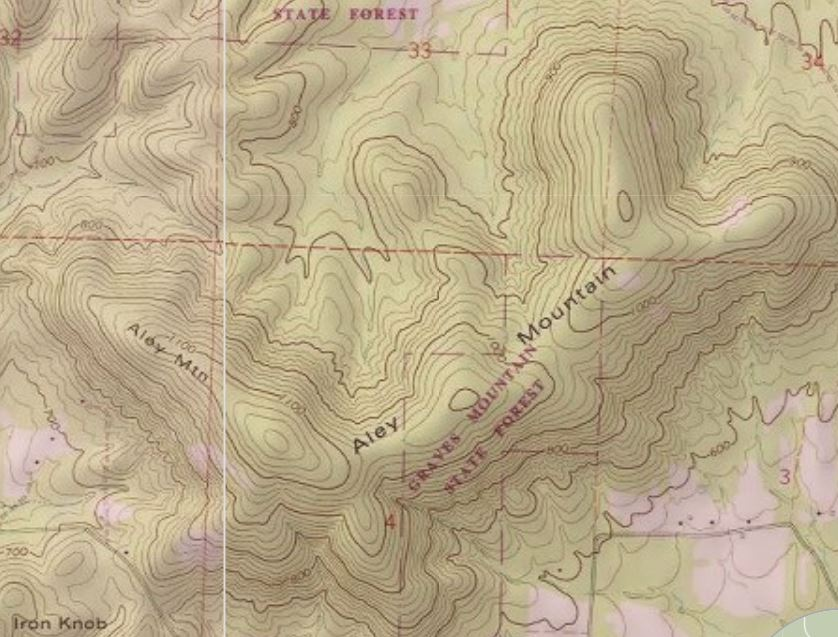
Section of USGS Topo map of Aley Mountain

Aley Mountain is a summit in northwest Wayne County, Missouri. The mountain forms an arc shaped mountain mass with three distinct peaks. The western peak has an elevation of 1,184 feet (361 m) while the two peaks to the northeast are each above 1200 feet.

The peak is about four miles northwest of Patterson and four miles south of Des Arc. Access is via county roads from route 34 to the south or route 49 at Gads Hill to the west.

Aley Mountain has the name of Solomon Aley, a pioneer citizen.
