= Hiram, Missouri =

Hiram
- Unincorporated community
- Location within the state of Missouri
- Coordinates: 37°10′44″N 90°18′53″W
- Country: United States
- State: Missouri
- County: Wayne
- Elevation: 505 ft (154 m)
- Time zone: UTC-6 (Central (CST))
  - Summer (DST): UTC-5 (CDT)
- GNIS feature ID: 750341

Hiram is an unincorporated community in eastern Wayne County, Missouri, United States. It is located on Missouri Route C, between Clubb to the northwest and Lowndes to the southeast, approximately twenty miles southwest of Marble Hill. The community is located on McCabe Creek, just north of that steam's confluence with Bear Creek.

== History ==
A post office called Hiram was established in 1900, and remained in operation until 1994. The community was named after Hiram Holliday, a businessman in the local lumber industry at Greenville.

Hiram was approximately midway on Holiday's 17 mile railroad spur running from Greenville (the county seat) to Cascade located in the northeast corner of the county. This spur transported most all of the virgin pine timber of the northeast portion of Wayne County between 1880 and 1910.
