= Flynn Hill =

Hill in Missouri, U.S.

Coordinates: 37°06′32″N 90°25′25″W

Flynn Hill is a summit in Wayne County in the U.S. state of Missouri. It has a peak elevation of 584 feet (178 m). The peak is juat west of Missouri Route B about three miles southeast of Greenville. Wappapello Lake on the St. Francis River lies about one-half mile to the southwest.

Flynn Hill has the name of the local Flynn family.
