= Ojibway, Missouri =

Extinct hamlet in Missouri, U.S.

Coordinates: 36°58′24″N 90°24′32″W

Ojibway is an extinct town in southern Wayne County, Missouri, United States. The community location lies adjacent to the Otter Creek arm of Lake Wappapello approximately one mile from the end of Missouri Route PP. Previous to the formation of the lake the community was along Otter Creek and the St. Louis and San Francisco Railroad line just west of Chaonia.

Ojibway had its start as a town in 1888 when the railroad was extended near that point. A post office called Ojibway was established in 1901, and remained in operation until 1940. The community has the name of the Ojibway Indians, though they did not live in the area
