= Burch, Missouri =

Unincorporated community in Missouri, U.S.

Coordinates: 37°16′06″N 90°21′16″W

Burch is an unincorporated community in northeast Wayne County, in the U.S. state of Missouri.

The community is near the headwaters of Bear Creek along County road 207 approximately 3.5 miles southeast of Coldwater and 3.5 miles north of Clubb.

== History ==
A post office called Burch was established in 1908, and remained in operation until 1938. The community has the name of George Burch, an early settler.
