= Missouri Route 143 =

State highway in Missouri, U.S.

Route 143
- Route 143 highlighted in orange

Route information
- Maintained by MoDOT
- Length: 17.507 mi (28.175 km)
- Existed: 1937–present
- History: Formerly Route 101

Major junctions
- South end: Route 34 near Patterson
- North end: Route 49 in Des Arc

Location
- Country: United States
- State: Missouri
- Counties: Wayne, Iron

Highway system
- Missouri State Highway System; Interstate; US; State; Supplemental
← Route 142	→ Route 144

Route 143 is a short state highway in southern Missouri. The route starts at Missouri Route 34 near Patterson, and it travels north through Sam A. Baker State Park. North of the park, Route 143 turns westwards and ends at Route 49 at Des Arc. The road that became part of Route 143 was constructed around 1934, as a supplemental route traveling east from Des Arc. Four years later, a new state route, Route 101, was constructed from Route 34 to the state park, and it was renumbered to Route 143 in 1941. By 1964, a new supplemental route connected the two routes. The two supplemental routes were merged into Route 143 around six years later.

== Route description ==
Route 143 is located in northern Wayne and southern Iron counties. In 2016, the Missouri Department of Transportation (MoDOT) calculated 672 vehicles, including 46 trucks, traveling on the route north of Route 34.

The route starts at Route 34 east of Patterson, and it crosses Clark Creek at County Road 312 (CRD 312) as it travels north. Past Logan Creek, Route 143 turns northeastwards towards Sam A. Baker State Park. The road travels along Big Creek, intersecting entrances to the state park's campground and visitor center, and then it crosses the creek. Northeast of CRD 318, Route 143 turns northwestwards and westwards near CRD 319. The road crosses Crane Pond Creek west of CRD 321. The route enters Iron County past Brunot. Inside the county, Route 143 continues traveling through a forested rural area. The road briefly turns south between CRD 162 and CRD 163, before turning west and paralleling Big Creek. Route 143 crosses the creek again near CRD 160 and enters Des Arc at CRD 167. The route ends at a T-intersection with Route 49 on the northern side of the village.

== History ==
Around 1934, a gravel road that extended several miles eastwards from Route 49 in Des Arc was designated as Route N. By 1937, another gravel road from Route 34 to Sam A. Baker State Park was constructed and designated as Route 101. Route N was extended to the Iron–Wayne county line by 1940. The road was renumbered to Route 143 by 1941, and the Route 101 designation was reused for another highway in Ozark and Howell counties. In late May of that year, a project to pave the entirety of Route 143 in oil aggregate treatment was announced. The work was completed by 1942. Route 143 was extended northwards further into the park by 1955, and Route N was paved in asphalt by 1958. A new gravel road, Route NN, connected Routes 143 and N by 1964, after it was proposed in 1961. Route NN was paved by 1968, and Route 143 replaced Routes N and NN by 1970, with its northern terminus at Route 49.

== Major intersections ==
County	Location	mi	km	Destinations	Notes
Wayne		0.000	0.000	Route 34 to US 67 – Piedmont	Southern terminus
Iron	Des Arc	17.507	28.175	Route 49 – Annapolis, Piedmont	Northern terminus
1.000 mi = 1.609 km; 1.000 km = 0.621 mi
