= Logan Creek (St. Francis River tributary) =

Stream in Missouri, United States

Logan Creek is a stream in Wayne County in the U.S. state of Missouri. It is a tributary of the St. Francis River.

The headwaters are at 37°15′33″N 90°32′16″W and the confluence with the St. Francis is at 37°12′53″N 90°30′42″W. The source area for the stream lies just west of Mudlick Mountain and Sam A. Baker State Park. The stream flows south past Camp Lee and east crossing under Missouri Route 143 to join the St. Francis within the northern portion of Lake Wappapello.

Logan Creek has the name of the local Logan family.

== See also ==
- List of rivers of Missouri
