= Missouri Route 49 =

State highway in Missouri, U.S.

Route 49

Route information
- Maintained by MoDOT
- Length: 117.187 mi (188.594 km)
- Existed: 1922–present

Major junctions
- South end: US 67 / Route 172 north of Poplar Bluff
- North end: Route 19 in Cherryville

Location
- Country: United States
- State: Missouri

Highway system
- Missouri State Highway System; Interstate; US; State; Supplemental
← I-49	→ US 50

Route 49 is a highway in eastern Missouri. Its northern terminus is at Route 19 in Cherryville, and its southern terminus is at U.S. Route 67 five miles (8 km) east of Williamsville.

The highway runs through the eastern part of the Ozarks and passes through two sections of the Mark Twain National Forest and near Johnson Shut-ins State Park and Taum Sauk Mountain. Lesterville and Annapolis, as well as Johnson Shut-ins State Park, were evacuated in 2005 following a reservoir failure at the Taum Sauk pumped storage plant.

Route 49 is one of the original 1922 state highways. It only ran between Glover and Piedmont and was later extended.

== Major intersections ==
County	Location	mi	km	Destinations	Notes
Wayne	Black River Township	0.000	0.000	US 67 / Route 172 east – Poplar Bluff, Greenville	Roadway continues as Route 172
Wayne	Williams Township	12.660	20.374	Route A – Ellsinore	Route 49 changes from an east–west to north–south orientation
Wayne	Leeper	22.362	35.988	Route 34 west to Route 21	Southern end of Route 34 overlap
Wayne	Piedmont	30.210	48.618	Route 34 east – Patterson	Northern end of Route 34 overlap
Iron	Des Arc	41.714	67.132	Route 143 south – Sam A. Baker	
Iron	Glover	59.048	95.029	Route 21 north / Route 72 east – Arcadia	Eastern end of Route 21 / Route 72 overlap
Reynolds	Lesterville Township	72.273	116.312	Route 21 south / Route 72 west – Centerville	Western end of Route 21 / Route 72 overlap
Iron	Dent Township	91.567	147.363	Route 32 east to Route 21	Eastern end of Route 32 overlap
Iron	Bixby	97.107	156.279	Route 32 west – Salem	Western end of Route 32 overlap
Crawford	Cherryville	117.187	188.594	Route 19 – Steelville, Salem	
1.000 mi = 1.609 km; 1.000 km = 0.621 mi: Concurrency terminus
