= Bennett Creek (Missouri) =

Stream in Wayne County, Missouri, United States

Bennett Creek is a stream in northwest Wayne County, Missouri, United States, that is a tributary of the St. Francis River.

== Description ==
The stream headwaters rise at 37°15′04″N 90°23′51″W and it flows generally west to its confluence with the St. Francis at 37°15′12″N 90°27′42″W. Just east of the confluence the stream crosses under U.S. Route 67 on the south edge of the community of Lodi.

Bennett Creek has the name of Larkin Bennett, an early settler.

== See also ==
- List of rivers of Missouri
