= Lost Creek (St. Francis River tributary) =

Stream in the U.S. state of Missouri

Lost Creek is a stream in Wayne County in the U.S. state of Missouri. It is a tributary of the St. Francis River.

The stream headwaters occur at the confluence of the West Fork Lost Creek and East Fork Lost Creek at 37°01′05″N 90°18′25″W currently within Lake Wappapello and the confluence with the St. Francis River is at 36°59′04″N 90°20′10″W also within Lake Wapapello.

Lost Creek was so named either due to its status as a losing stream or due to a pioneer incident in which a man became lost near its course.

== See also ==
- List of rivers of Missouri
