= Shook, Missouri =

Shook
- Unincorporated community
- Location within the state of Missouri
- Coordinates: 37°02′34″N 90°18′32″W
- Country: United States
- State: Missouri
- County: Wayne
- Elevation: 400 ft (120 m)
- Time zone: UTC-6 (Central (CST))
  - Summer (DST): UTC-5 (CDT)
- GNIS feature ID: 752136

Shook is an unincorporated community in Wayne County, Missouri, United States. The community is located on the West Fork Lost Creek arm of Lake Wappapello along Missouri Route D, approximately sixteen miles north of Poplar Bluff.

The Shook post office was in operation from 1904 to 1999. The community has the name of George Shook, an early settler.
