= Andys Creek =

Stream in Missouri, U.S.

Andys Creek Tributary to Bear Creek
- Location of Andys Creek mouth Andys Creek (the United States)

Location
- Country: United States
- State: Missouri
- County: Wayne

Physical characteristics
- Source: McCabe Creek divide
  - location: about 8 miles northeast of Greenville, Missouri
  - coordinates: 37°11′2.19″N 90°17′19.40″W
  - elevation: 575 ft (175 m)
- Mouth: Bear Creek
  - location: about 10 miles north-northeast of Childers Hill
  - coordinates: 37°10′8.19″N 90°14′39.39″W
  - elevation: 400 ft (120 m)
- Length: 2.65 mi (4.26 km)
- Basin size: 3.90 square miles (10.1 km^{2})
- Discharge
  - location: Bear Creek
  - average: 7.65 cu ft/s (0.217 m^{3}/s) at mouth with Bear Creek

Basin features
- Progression: Bear Creek → Castor River → Headwater Diversion Channel → Mississippi River → Gulf of Mexico
- River system: Castor River
- Tributaries
  - left: unnamed tributaries
  - right: unnamed tributaries
- Bridges: Mo-Oo

Andys Creek is a stream in eastern Wayne County, Missouri. It is a tributary of Bear Creek.

Andys Creek, historically called "Andy's Branch", has the name of a pioneer citizen.

== See also ==
- List of rivers of Missouri
