= Logan Creek =

Logan Creek may refer to:

== Australia ==
- Logan Creek (Queensland), a stream in Central Queensland, Australia

== United States ==
- Logan Creek (Black River), a stream in Missouri, United States
- Logan Creek (St. Francis River), a stream in Missouri, United States
- Logan Creek (California), a stream in Columba County, California, United States
- Logan Creek Dredge, a canal in eastern Nebraska, United States
- Logan Creek, Nevada, an unincorporated community in Nevada, United States

=== Montana ===
- Logan Creek (Blaine County), a stream in Blaine County, Montana, United States
- Logan Creek (Haystack Creek tributary), a stream in Flathead County, Montana, United States
- Logan Creek (Hungry Horse Reservoir tributary), a stream in Flathead County, Montana, United States
- Logan Creek (Tally Lake tributary), a stream in Flathead County, Montana, United States
- Logan Creek (Lincoln County), a stream in Lincoln County, Montana, United States
