= Barlow, Missouri =

Extinct hamlet in Missouri, U.S.

Coordinates: 37°00′50″N 90°36′50″W

Barlow is an extinct town in Wayne County, in the U.S. state of Missouri. The community was on the railroad line along the east bank of the Black River between Leeper to the northwest and Williamsville to the southeast.

Barlow had its start in 1891 when the railroad was extended to that point. The community has the name of James Barlow, a pioneer citizen.
