= Missouri Route 172 =

State highway in Missouri, U.S.

Route 172
- MO 172 highlighted in red

Route information
- Maintained by MoDOT
- Length: 8.810 mi (14.178 km)

Major junctions
- West end: US 67 / Route 49 in Mark Twain National Forest
- Route W in Mark Twain National Forest
- East end: End of state maintenance in Lake Wappapello State Park

Location
- Country: United States
- State: Missouri
- Counties: Wayne

Highway system
- Missouri State Highway System; Interstate; US; State; Supplemental
← Route 171	→ Route 173

Route 172 is a state highway in the Mark Twain National Forest, specifically in Wayne County, Missouri. The route runs for 8.97 miles (14.44 km) eastward as a two-lane highway through dense forests. Route 172 begins at an intersection with U.S. Route 67 just south of the intersection nearby with Route 49. Route 172 has a mile-long concurrency midway with Supplemental Route W, where the Route 172 returns to its eastern terminus, Lake Wappapello State Park. The route does not pass any communities or municipalities on its stretch.

== Route description ==
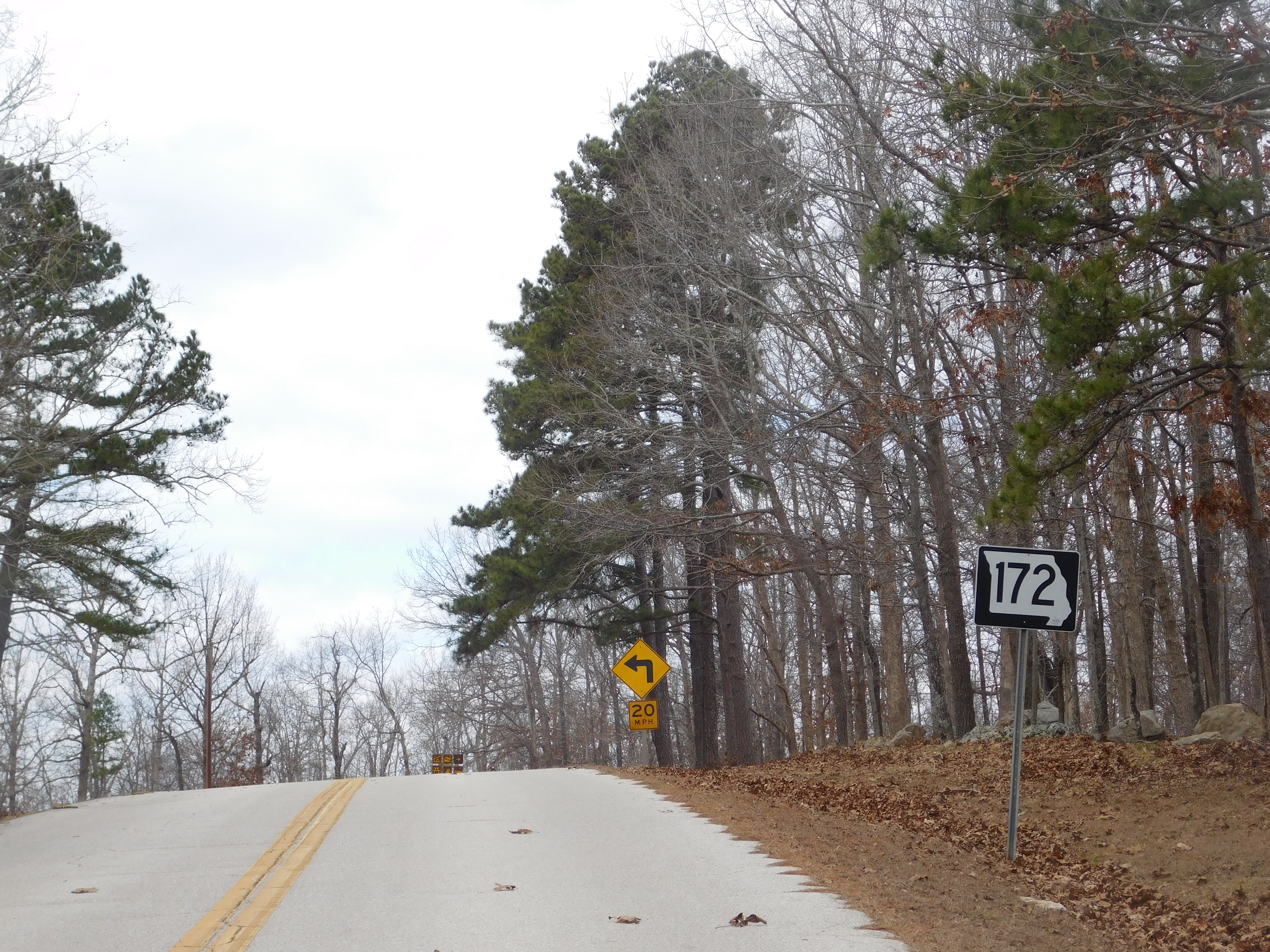
Route 172 in Lake Wappapello State Park

Route 172 begins at an intersection with U.S. Route 67 in the Mark Twain National Forest just south of Route 49. The route progresses eastward as a two lane highway through dense forests, soon weaving from northeast to the southeast. The highway crosses a power line cut and continues its gradual bends in different directions until becoming a steady northeastern road near an intersection with County Road 552, which heads southeast into the forest. The two highways parallel a distance apart, as Route 172 makes yet another dip to the southeast. After turning northeast, the right-of-way is taken over by Supplemental Route PP, where Route 172 turns to the southeast and enters a long clearing.

In the clearing, the highway intersects with Supplemental Route W and the two roads become concurrent. For the mile-long concurrency, the surroundings remain dense forests until Route 172 forks eastward in a small clearing. The surroundings return to dense forests for Route 172, intersecting with an access road to Deer Run Acres and crossing into the outer edges of Lake Wappapello State Park. The designation terminates within the park, while the right-of-way continues towards Lake Wappapello.

== Junction list ==
The entire route is in Wayne County.

Location	mi	km	Destinations	Notes
Mark Twain National Forest	0.000	0.000	US 67 / Route 49	Western terminus of Route 172
Mark Twain National Forest	3.532	5.684	Route PP	Southern terminus of Route PP
Mark Twain National Forest	4.411	7.099	Route W	Southern end of concurrency
Mark Twain National Forest	5.486	8.829	Route W	Northern end of concurrency
Mark Twain National Forest	8.810	14.178	End of state maintenance in Lake Wappapello State Park	Eastern terminus of Route 172
1.000 mi = 1.609 km; 1.000 km = 0.621 mi: Concurrency terminus
