= Buckhorn, Madison County, Missouri =

Unincorporated community in Madison County, Missouri, United States

Coordinates: 37°20′17″N 90°17′22″W

Buckhorn is an unincorporated community in southeastern Madison County, Missouri, United States.

== Description ==
The community is located on Missouri Route M at the location where the West, Middle and East forks of Big Creek converge. The site is approximately one and a half miles (2.4 km) north of the Madison-Wayne county line. The community of Cascade is about three miles (4.8 km) south on Big Creek.

== History ==
A post office called Buckhorn was established in 1901, and remained in operation until 1959. The community took its name from a nearby creek of the same name where bucks were abundant.
