= Goose Creek (Big Creek tributary) =

Stream in the U.S. state of Missouri

Goose Creek is a stream in northern Wayne and southern Iron counties in the U.S. state of Missouri. It is a tributary of Big Creek.

The stream headwaters arise in Wayne County on the southwest flank of Des Arc Mountain at an elevation of 980 feet (300 m) (at 37°15′26″N 90°37′15″W). The stream flows southwest then northwest passing through the Chain of Lakes and into Iron County. The stream flows through Des Arc paralleling Missouri Route 49 and enters Big Creek just northeast of the town (at 37°17′30″N 90°37′38″W) at an elevation of 515 feet (157 m).

Goose Creek most likely was so named on account of wild geese in the area.

== See also ==
- List of rivers of Missouri
