= Lodi, Missouri =

Unincorporated community in Wayne County, Missouri, United States

Lodi
- Unincorporated community
- Location within the state of Missouri Location within the United States
- Coordinates: 37°15′23″N 90°27′10″W
- Country: United States
- State: Missouri
- County: Wayne
- Elevation: 427 ft (130 m)
- Time zone: UTC-6 (Central (CST))
  - Summer (DST): UTC-5 (CDT)
- GNIS feature ID: 721401

Lodi is an unincorporated community in Wayne County, Missouri, United States. It is located on Bennett Creek, just east of the St. Francis River.

== Description ==
U.S. Route 67 passes through the community, approximately 13 miles (21 km) northeast of Piedmont. The Coldwater Conservation Area lies to the northeast of Lodi and Sam A. Baker State Park lies to the west across the St. Francis River.

A post office called Lodi has been in operation since 1892. The name most likely is a transfer from Lodi, Italy.

According to ZIP code data, about 66 people live in the 63950 area of Lodi, Missouri.
