= Ladero =

Ladero may refer to:

- Ladero, Missouri
- Héctor Ladero (born 1989), a Spanish football (soccer) player
- Ladera/ladero, a category of dishes in Ottoman cuisine made with olive oil

== See also ==
- Ladera (disambiguation)
