= Upalika, Missouri =

Extinct hamlet in Missouri, U.S.

Coordinates: 36°56′12″N 90°38′21″W

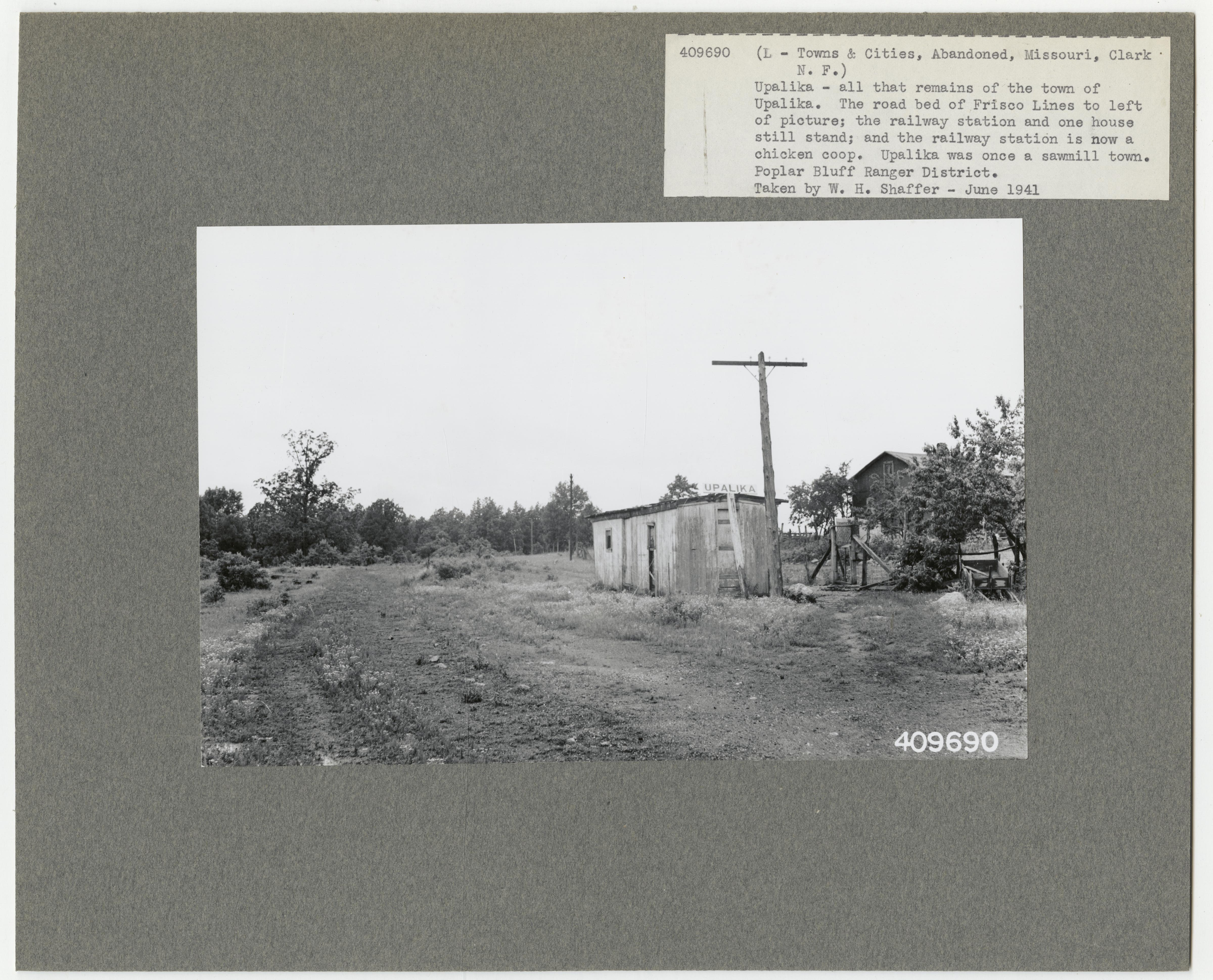
Upalika in 1941

Upalika is an extinct town in southwest Wayne County, in the U.S. state of Missouri. The GNIS classifies it as a populated place. The community is on County Road 426 five miles southwest of Williamsville and 5.5 miles east of Ellsinore in adjacent Carter County.

Upalika had its start ca. 1891 when the railroad was extended to that point. A post office called Upalika was established in 1892, and remained in operation until 1927. Some maintain the name "Upalika" is Native American in origin, while others believe a railroad worker gave the community the name of his wife.
