= Chaonia, Missouri =

Extinct town in Missouri, U.S.

Coordinates: 36°58′55″N 90°21′04″W

Chaonia is an extinct town in Wayne County, in the U.S. state of Missouri. The site was on the bank of the St. Francis River and is now within Lake Wappapello. The Chaonia Landing recreation area at the end of Missouri Route W is about one-half mile south of the original location. The Chaonia Cemetery is on a ridge one half mile east of the recreation area.

Chaonia was originally called Wellsdale, and under the latter name was platted in 1887 when the railroad was built to that point. A post office called Chaonia was established in 1888, and remained in operation until 1940.
