= White Hollow =

White Hollow may refer to:

- White Hollow (Iron County, Missouri), a valley in Missouri
- White Hollow (Wayne County, Missouri), a valley in Missouri
