= Barnes Creek (Bear Creek tributary) =

Stream in Missouri, U.S.

Coordinates: 37°09′05″N 90°15′33″W

Barnes Creek is a stream in Wayne County in the U.S. state of Missouri. It is a tributary of Bear Creek.

The stream headwaters arise in northeastern Wayne County north of Missouri Route P (at ) and the stream flows generally north to its confluence with Bear Creek just northeast of the community of Lowndes adjacent to Missouri Route E (at ).

Barnes Creek, historically called "Barnes Fork", has the name of Clayburn Barnes, the original owner of the site.

== See also ==
- List of rivers of Missouri
