= Thompson Hollow =

Valley in the US state of Missouri

Coordinates: 37.260885°N 90.222610°W

Thompson Hollow is a valley in Wayne County in the U.S. state of Missouri.

Thompson Hollow, also known as "Thompson Holler", was named after an early citizen.
