= Des Arc =

Des Arc may refer to:

- Des Arc, Arkansas
- Des Arc, Missouri
