= Ladero, Missouri =

Unincorporated community in Missouri, U.S.

Coordinates: 36°59′45″N 90°28′12″W

Ladero was an unincorporated community in southern Wayne County, in the U.S. state of Missouri. The community is on Otter Creek approximately one mile (two kilometers) west of US Route 67 and the St. Francis River.

Ladero had its start when the railroad was extended to that point. It is unknown why the name "Ladero" was applied to this community.
