= Perkins Hollow =

Valley in the US state of Missouri

Coordinates: 37.2392183°N 90.3259455°W

Perkins Hollow is a valley in Wayne County in the U.S. state of Missouri. It bears the name of John Perkins, an early settler.
