= Barnes Creek =

Barnes Creek may refer to:

- Barnes Creek (Bear Creek tributary), a stream in Missouri
- Barnes Creek (Uwharrie River tributary), a stream in North Carolina
- Barnes Creek (Washington)
- Barnes Creek (Wisconsin)
