= Holliday Creek =

Holliday Creek may refer to:

- Holliday Creek (Missouri), a stream in Missouri
- Holliday Creek (Wichita River tributary), a stream in Texas
