= Ojibwe (disambiguation) =

The Ojibwe are a native people of North America.

Ojibwe, Ojibway, or Ojibwa may also refer to:

== People and cultures ==
- The Ojibwe language, also called "Anishinaabemowin", an Algonquian language traditionally spoken by the Algonquin, Nipissing, Ojibwa, Saulteaux, Mississaugas, and Odawa, native peoples of North America

== Places ==
- Ojibwa (community), Wisconsin, an unincorporated community
- Ojibway, Michigan, an inunincorporated community
- Ojibway, Missouri, a ghost town
- Ojibwa, Wisconsin, a town
- Glacial Lake Ojibway, a prehistoric lake in what is now eastern Canada
- Ojibway Parkway a road on the far west side of Windsor, Ontario, Canada
- Ojibway Peak, a mountain in Montana
- Ojibway Prairie Complex, a complex of parks on the west side of Windsor, Ontario, Canada, including Ojibway Park and Ojibway Prairie Provincial Nature Reserve
- Ojibway Provincial Park, a park in northwestern Ontario, Canada
- Ojibwa Island
- Ojibwa Airpark, in Michigan
- Ojibway Nation of Saugeen, in Ontario Canada
- Ojibway Correctional Facility, in Michigan

== Watercraft ==
- Ojibway, a 1942 lake freighter operated by Lower Lakes Towing
- HMCS Ojibwa, a submarine of the Canadian Forces

== Other uses ==
- Ojibway Club, a community centre located in Pointe au Baril, Ontario, Canada
