= Platow, Missouri =

Extinct hamlet in Missouri, U.S.

Coordinates: 37°11′52″N 90°42′22″W

Platow is an extinct town in Wayne County, in the U.S. state of Missouri. The GNIS classifies it as a populated place.

It is unknown why the name "Platow" was applied to this community.
