= Clubb, Missouri =

Clubb
- Unincorporated community
- Location within the state of Missouri
- Coordinates: 37°12′52″N 90°20′44″W
- Country: United States
- State: Missouri
- County: Wayne
- Elevation: 551 ft (168 m)
- Time zone: UTC-6 (Central (CST))
  - Summer (DST): UTC-5 (CDT)
- GNIS feature ID: 749390

Clubb is an unincorporated community in northeastern Wayne County, Missouri, United States. It is located at the junction of Missouri Route 34 and Missouri Route C approximately twenty miles southwest of Marble Hill. Greenville is eight miles to the southwest on the St. Francis River. Bear Creek flows past the southeast side of the community.

A post office called Clubb was established in 1892, and remained in operation until 1959. The community has the name of Jake Clubb, who kept a local country store.
