= Peoples Hollow =

Valley in Missouri, United States

Coordinates: 36.9442196°N 90.2789949°W

Peoples Hollow is a valley in Wayne County in the U.S. state of Missouri.

Peoples Hollow has the name of Walker Peoples, a pioneer citizen.
