= Gaylor, Missouri =

Unincorporated community in Missouri, U.S.

Coordinates: 37°05′48″N 90°42′50″W

Gaylor is an unincorporated community in Wayne County, Missouri, United States. The community was on the Black River south of Clearwater Lake approximately one mile north of Leeper.

A variant name was "Chilton".
