= Big Creek (Castor River tributary) =

Stream in the U.S. state of Missouri

Coordinates: 37°17′23″N 90°13′39″W

Big Creek is a stream in southern Madison and northeastern Wayne counties the U.S. state of Missouri. It is a tributary of the Castor River.

The stream headwaters are at the confluence of the East Fork Big Creek and Middle Fork Big Creek just south of Buckhorn in Madison County at . The stream flows southeast parallel to Missouri Route M into Wayne County. The stream flows past the communities of Cascade and Gravelton where it turns easterly to enter the Castor River one half mile from the Wayne-Bollinger county line at .

Big Creek was named so because it is large relative to other nearby creeks.

== See also ==
- List of rivers of Missouri
