= Wappapello, Missouri =

Wappapello
- Unincorporated community
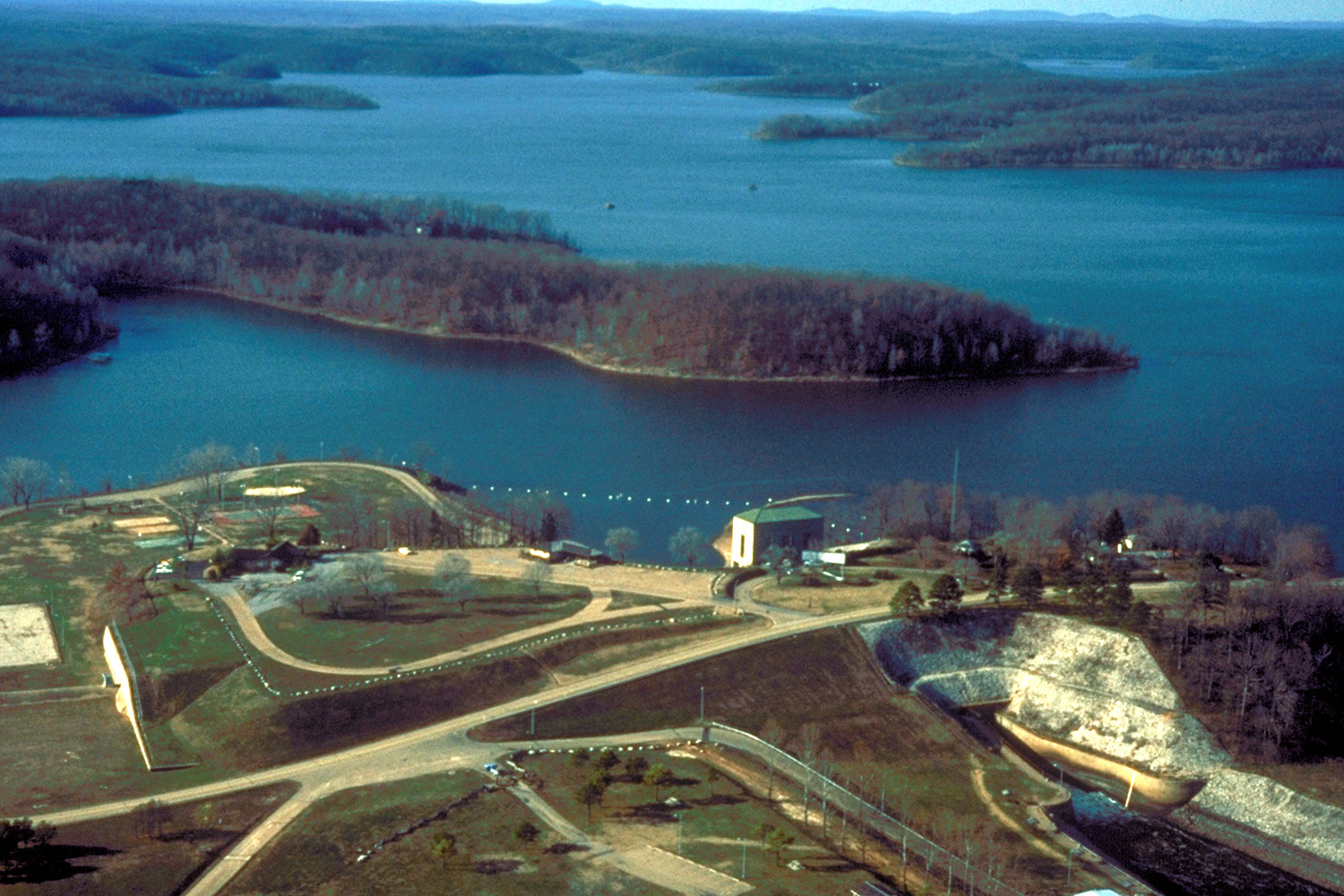
- Wappapello Lake near the town of Wappapello, Missouri

- Location within the state of Missouri
- Coordinates: 36°56′08″N 90°16′15″W
- Country: United States
- State: Missouri
- County: Wayne
- Elevation: 354 ft (108 m)
- Time zone: UTC-6 (Central (CST))
  - Summer (DST): UTC-5 (CDT)
- ZIP code: 63966
- Area code: 573
- GNIS feature ID: 752753

Wappapello (/ˈwɒpəpəloʊ/ WOP-ə-pəl-oh) is an unincorporated community in southeastern Wayne County, Missouri, United States. It is located approximately thirteen miles northeast of Poplar Bluff, next to Lake Wappapello.

Wappapello was founded by Samuel R. Kelley, a veteran of the Civil War. He was originally from Ohio, saw the Wappapello area as a young Union soldier, and homesteaded land there after the war.

Wappapello was laid out in 1884 when the railroad was extended to that point. The community has the name of a Native American chieftain. A post office called Wappapello has been in operation since 1884.
