= Huzzah Creek (St. Francis River tributary) =

Stream in the U.S. state of Missouri

Huzzah Creek (/ˈhuːzɑː/ HOO-zah) is a stream in southern Madison County the U.S. state of Missouri. It is a tributary of the St. Francis River.

The stream headwaters arise just south of Missouri Route N and one mile west of US Route 67 at an elevation of about 730 feet. The stream flows southwest then west for a distance of about two miles with the final half mile passing through Huzzah Canyon. The confluence with the St. Francis is about one mile north of the Madison-Wayne county line. The confluence is at an elevation of 436 feet. Nearby communities include Coldwater about 2.5 miles southeast of the confluence in Wayne County, Saco 2.5 miles north and Beulah three miles to the west.

The source is at 37°20′09″N 90°24′32″W and the confluence is at 37°19′41″N 90°26′38″W.

Huzzah is a variant name of the Osage Indians.

== See also ==
- List of rivers of Missouri
