= Taskee Station, Missouri =

Extinct hamlet in Missouri, U.S.

Coordinates: 36.99255°N 90.45039°W

Taskee Station is an extinct town in Wayne County, in the U.S. state of Missouri.

Taskee Station had its start in 1889 when the railroad was extended to that point. A post office called Taskee Station was 1890, and remained in operation until 1941. A variant name was "Taskee".
