= Brunot, Missouri =

Brunot
- Unincorporated community
- Location within the state of Missouri
- Coordinates: 37°18′37″N 90°32′24″W
- Country: United States
- State: Missouri
- County: Wayne
- Elevation: 495 ft (151 m)
- Time zone: UTC-6 (Central (CST))
  - Summer (DST): UTC-5 (CDT)
- ZIP codes: 63636
- Area code: 573
- GNIS feature ID: 730456

Brunot is an unincorporated community in the northwest corner of Wayne County, Missouri, United States. It is located approximately six miles east of Des Arc on Route 143. The community is on the west bank of Crane Pond Creek.

== History ==
The area of modern-day Brunot was part of a concession given to Domitille DeHault by the Spanish lieutenant-governor in 1800. Brunot was named for Felix A.R. Brunot, one of the partners of Singer and Company who helped start the community. He also owned mineral rights in the area. Brunot was originally created to be a county seat, but it is now located in Greenville.

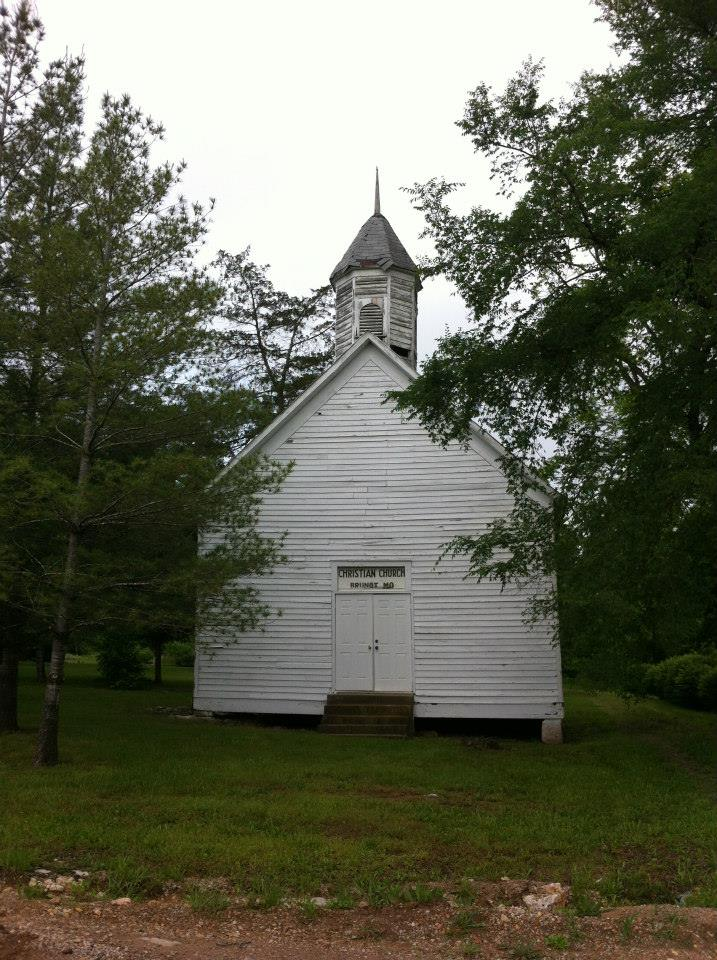
Brunot Christian Church

It was given the name Brunot by 1860 and it officially had a post office which was designated in 1858. The post office during the American Civil War was often the only one that operated in Wayne County. The post office officially closed in 1957, when any stores that had existed in the town had also closed.

== Religion ==
The town maintained two different churches, including a Christian and a Methodist church, both of which are long abandoned. The Christian church was founded in the 1880s and continued services until the 1950s. The longest serving pastor, Reverend Isaac Brooks, preached there as a circuit riding pastor from 1909 to 1934.
