= Huzzah Creek =

Huzzah Creek may refer to:

- Huzzah Creek (Meramec River), a stream in Missouri
- Huzzah Creek (St. Francis River), a stream in Missouri
