= Lake Wappapello State Park =

State park in Missouri, United States

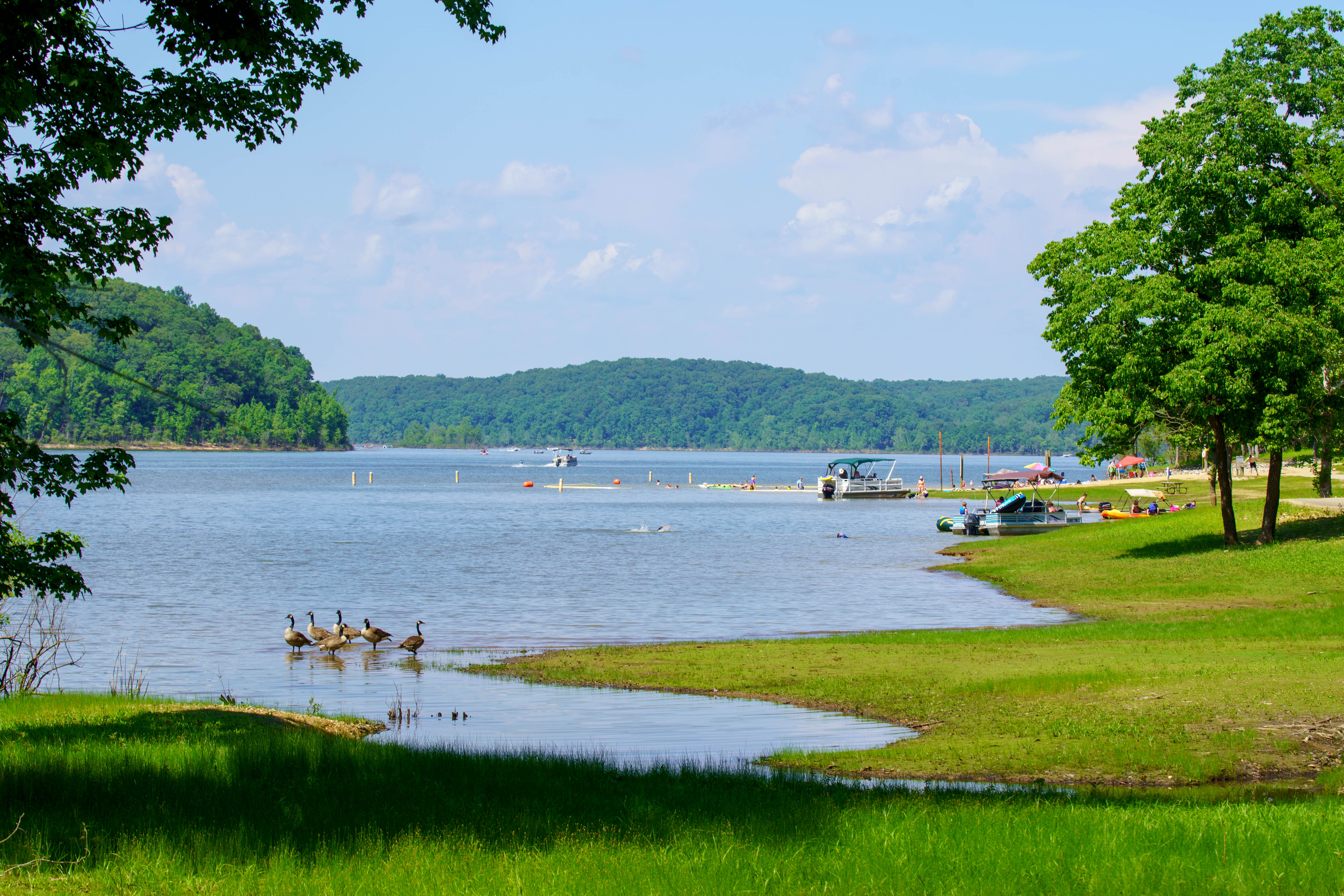

- Location within Missouri Location within the United States
- Location: Wayne County, Missouri, United States
- Coordinates: 36°56′21″N 90°19′35″W
- Area: 1,854.23 acres (750.38 ha)
- Elevation: 443 ft (135 m)
- Established: 1956
- Administrator: Missouri Department of Natural Resources
- Visitors: 98,373 (in 2023)
- Website: Official website

Lake Wappapello State Park is a public recreation area consisting of 1,854 acres (750 ha) bordering Lake Wappapello in Wayne County, Missouri. The state park features two campgrounds, trails for hikers, bikers, backpackers, and equestrians, and swimming, fishing, and boating on the lake.

== History ==
Lake Wappapello was created when, beginning in 1938, the U.S. Army Corps of Engineers dammed the St. Francis River for flood control purposes. The state began leasing land bordering the lake for use as a state park in 1956.
