= Cedar Bay =

Cedar Bay may refer to:

- Cedar Bay (Missouri), a stream in the U.S. state of Missouri
- Cedar Bay National Park, a protected area in Queensland, Australia
- Cedar Bay cherry, a tropical plant

== Other uses ==
- Bay cedar, a tropical plant
