= Bull Run Camp, Missouri =

Unincorporated community in Missouri, U.S.

Coordinates: 36°57′57″N 90°35′36″W

Bull Run Camp is an unincorporated community in Wayne County, in the U.S. state of Missouri.

The location was adjacent to the west bank of the Black River approximately two miles west of Williamsville.

The community was so named on account of work animals in the nearby logging district.
