= Huzzah (disambiguation) =

Huzzah is an English exclamation.

Huzzah may also refer to:

- Huzzah, Missouri, an unincorporated community in Crawford County, Missouri
- Huzzah Creek (Meramec River), a stream in Missouri
- Huzzah Creek (St. Francis River), a stream in Missouri
- Huzzah, a character in Clive Barker's novel Imajica
- Huzzah Sound, a company founded by the Australian sound designer Andrew Plain
