= Meador Valley =

Valley in Missouri, United States

Coordinates: 37.10894°N 90.57095°W

Meador Valley is a valley in Wayne County in the U.S. state of Missouri.

Meador Valley has the name of Henry Meador, a pioneer citizen.
