= Brunot =

Brunot may refer to:

== Places ==
- Brunot Island, a river island in Allegheny County, Pennsylvania, United States
- Brunot, Missouri, an unincorporated community in Wayne County, Missouri, United States

== People with the surname ==
- André Brunot (1879–1973), French actor
- Ferdinand Brunot (1860–1938), French linguist and philologist
