= Fort Benton (Patterson, Missouri) =

- U.S. National Register of Historic Places
- Location within Missouri Location within the United States
- Location: 3.5 mi. S of jct. of MO 67 and MO 34, Patterson, Missouri
- Coordinates: 37°11′2″N 90°33′14″W
- Area: less than one acre
- Built: 1863
- NRHP reference No.: 02000212
- Added to NRHP: October 21, 2002

Fort Benton, also known as Fort Hill, is a historic American Civil War fortification located near Patterson, Wayne County, Missouri. Its earthen walls measure approximately 100 feet by 100 feet. The fortification supported an encampment of Union troops stationed at Patterson to secure the area against local Confederate guerillas. It was also one of a string of fortifications designed protect Union Missouri from invasion from Confederate Arkansas.

Fort Benton was named after William Plummer Benton

It was listed on the National Register of Historic Places in 2002.
