= White Hollow (Wayne County, Missouri) =

Valley in the US state of Missouri

Coordinates: 37.205329°N 90.390946°W

White Hollow is a valley in Wayne County in the U.S. state of Missouri.

White Hollow has the name of Frank White, an early settler.
