= Black River Township, Wayne County, Missouri =

Township in Wayne County, Missouri, U.S.

Coordinates: 36.9753°N 90.4322°W

Black River Township is an inactive township in Wayne County, in the U.S. state of Missouri.

Black River Township takes its name from the Black River.
