= Oscar Hollow =

Stream in the US state of Missouri

Coordinates: 36°58′18″N 90°13′50″W

Oscar Hollow is a stream in Wayne County in the U.S. state of Missouri. It is a tributary to Kentucky Slough.

Oscar Hollow has the name of Oscar Lurker, a pioneer citizen.

== See also ==
- List of rivers of Missouri
