= Mill Spring, Missouri =

- Village
- Location of Mill Spring, Missouri
- Coordinates: 37°03′54″N 90°40′40″W
- Country: United States
- State: Missouri
- County: Wayne

Area
  - Total: 0.44 sq mi (1.14 km^{2})
  - Land: 0.44 sq mi (1.14 km^{2})
  - Water: 0 sq mi (0.00 km^{2})
- Elevation: 466 ft (142 m)

Population (2020)
  - Total: 159
  - Density: 361.4/sq mi (139.52/km^{2})
- Time zone: UTC-6 (Central (CST))
  - Summer (DST): UTC-5 (CDT)
- ZIP code: 63952
- Area code: 573
- FIPS code: 29-48386
- GNIS feature ID: 2399349

Mill Spring is a village in Wayne County, Missouri, United States, along the Black River. The population was 159 at the 2020 census.

== History ==
Mill Spring was laid out in 1871. The community took its name from a nearby spring of the same name which once powered lumber mills. A post office called Mill Spring has been in operation since 1874. Millspring post office was shut down in 2014

== Geography ==
Mill Spring is located in a tributary valley on the northeast edge of the Black River floodplain. The community of Leeper is approximately one mile to the northwest along Missouri Route 49.

According to the United States Census Bureau, the village has a total area of 0.44 square miles (1.14 km^{2}), all land.

== Demographics ==
Historical population
Census	Pop.	Note	%±
1880	174		—
1960	226		—
1970	207		−8.4%
1980	257		24.2%
1990	252		−1.9%
2000	219		−13.1%
2010	189		−13.7%
2020	159		−15.9%
U.S. Decennial Census

=== 2010 census ===
At the 2010 census, there were 189 people, 81 households and 46 families living in the village. The population density was 429.5 per square mile (165.8/km^{2}). There were 106 housing units at an average density of 240.9 per square mile (93.0/km^{2}). The racial makeup was 96.8% White, 1.1% African American, 0.5% from other races, and 1.6% from two or more races. Hispanic or Latino of any race were 0.5% of the population.

There were 81 households, of which 25.9% had children under the age of 18 living with them, 38.3% were married couples living together, 13.6% had a female householder with no husband present, 4.9% had a male householder with no wife present, and 43.2% were non-families. 30.9% of all households were made up of individuals, and 13.6% had someone living alone who was 65 years of age or older. The average household size was 2.33 and the average family size was 3.02.

The median age was 37.8 years. 21.7% of residents were under the age of 18; 9.9% were between the ages of 18 and 24; 26% were from 25 to 44; 27% were from 45 to 64; and 15.3% were 65 years of age or older. The gender makeup was 51.9% male and 48.1% female.

=== 2000 census ===
At the 2000 census, there were 219 people, 81 households and 55 families living in the village. The population density was 1,041.8 inhabitants per square mile (402.2/km^{2}). There were 104 housing units at an average density of 494.7 per square mile (191.0/km^{2}). The racial makeup was 96.35% White, 0.46% Native American, 0.91% Pacific Islander and 2.28% from two or more races.

There were 81 households, of which 30.9% had children under the age of 18 living with them, 45.7% were married couples living together, 13.6% had a female householder with no husband present, and 30.9% were non-families. 24.7% of all households were made up of individuals, and 16.0% had someone living alone who was 65 years of age or older. The average household size was 2.70 and the average family size was 3.13.

28.8% of the population were under the age of 18, 8.7% from 18 to 24, 24.2% from 25 to 44, 17.8% from 45 to 64, and 20.5% who were 65 years of age or older. The median age was 37 years. For every 100 females, there were 104.7 males. For every 100 females age 18 and over, there were 97.5 males.

The median household income was $22,750 and the median family income was $26,389. Males had a median income of $18,125 and females $14,063. The per capita income was $9,723. About 13.5% of families and 22.7% of the population were below the poverty line, including 25.0% of those under the age of eighteen and 20.0% of those 65 or over.

== Notable person ==
- Bernarr Macfadden, magazine publisher and fitness authority
