= Beckville, Piedmont, Missouri =

Neighborhood in Missouri, U.S.

Coordinates: 37.146908441°N 90.693697706°W

Beckville is a neighborhood of Piedmont, Missouri. It was formerly an independent unincorporated community.

The community has the name of Louis Beck, a first settler. A variant name was "Carters".
