= Garwood, Missouri =

Unincorporated community in Missouri, U.S.

Coordinates: 37°03′59″N 90°52′40″W

Garwood is an unincorporated community in southern Reynolds County, in the U.S. state of Missouri. The community is on Missouri Route 34 and approximately eight miles northeast of Van Buren in adjacent Carter County.

== History ==
A post office called Garwood was established in 1907, and remained in operation until 1954. The community most likely was named after a businessperson in the local logging industry. The building that served as a one-room schoolhouse still stands and is known as the Garwood Community Center. The old post office became a general store and gas station, owned by various proprietors throughout late 20th century, and eventually became a restaurant. It burned to the ground in 1999.
