= Otter Creek (St. Francis River tributary) =

Stream in the US state of Missouri

Otter Creek is a stream in Wayne County in the U.S. state of Missouri. It is a tributary of St. Francis River within Lake Wappapello.

The stream headwaters arise at 37°08′04″N 90°37′44″W and the confluence with the St. Francis is at 36°59′03″N 90°22′49″W at an elevation of 358 feet (109 m).

Otter Creek most likely was so named on account of otters near its course.

== See also ==
- List of rivers of Missouri
