= Missouri Route 34 =

State highway in Missouri, U.S.

Route 34

Route information
- Maintained by MoDOT
- Length: 88.153 mi (141.869 km)
- Existed: 1922–present

Major junctions
- West end: US 60 / Route 21 east of Van Buren
- Route 21 west of Garwood; Route 49 in Piedmont; Route 143 east of Patterson; US 67 north of Silva; Route 51 in Marble Hill
- East end: Route 72 in Jackson

Location
- Country: United States
- State: Missouri

Highway system
- Missouri State Highway System; Interstate; US; State; Supplemental
← Route 33	→ I-35

Route 34 is a highway in southeastern Missouri. Its eastern terminus is at the Illinois state line on the Mississippi River at Cape Girardeau where it overlaps Route 74. Its western terminus is at U.S. Route 60 (US 60) near Van Buren. The road continues into Illinois via the Bill Emerson Memorial Bridge as Illinois Route 146.

== Route description ==
Route 34 begins at a junction with US 60 and Route 21 east of Van Buren in Carter County. The highway heads north from the junction running concurrently with Route 21 for about 3.4 miles (5.5 km), crossing into Reynolds County. Just north of the county line, the routes separate and Route 34 continues easterly through the far southern portion of Reynolds County, passing through Garwood before entering Wayne County. Near the unincorporated community of Leeper, Route 34 crosses the Black River and soon after meets Route 49; the two highways run concurrently northward for 7.8 miles (12.6 km) through Piedmont. Route 34 then continues northeasterly toward Patterson. Just east of Patterson, Route 34 intersects Route 143, which provides access to Sam A. Baker State Park.

Continuing eastward, Route 34 reaches Silva, where it meets US 67 at an interchange. The highway then enters Bollinger County, passing through Lutesville before reaching Marble Hill, where it intersects Route 51. Route 34 runs concurrently with Route 51 through Marble Hill before separating and heading easterly toward Cape Girardeau County. Lastly, Route 34 passes through Millersville before reaching its eastern terminus at a junction with Route 72 in Jackson.

== History ==
Route 34 is one of the original 1922 state highways. Its original eastern terminus was at Jackson.

== Major intersections ==
County	Location	mi	km	Destinations	Notes
Carter		0.000	0.000	US 60 / Route 21 south	Western end of Route 21 overlap
Reynolds		3.367	5.419	Route 21 north – Ellington	Eastern end of Route 21 overlap
Wayne		17.939	28.870	Route 49 south – Leeper, Mill Spring	Western end of Route 49 overlap
Wayne	Piedmont	25.787	41.500	Route 49 north – Des Arc	Eastern end of Route 49 overlap
Wayne		35.492	57.119	Route 143 north	
Wayne		39.301	63.249	US 67 – Fredericktown, Greenville, Poplar Bluff	Interchange
Bollinger	Lutesville	70.821	113.975	Route 51 south	Western end of Route 51 overlap
Bollinger	Marble Hill	71.321	114.780	Route 51 north – Perryville	Eastern end of Route 51 overlap
Cape Girardeau		88.153	141.869	Route 72 – Millersville	
1.000 mi = 1.609 km; 1.000 km = 0.621 mi: Concurrency terminus
