= Gravelton, Missouri =

Unincorporated community in Missouri, U.S.

Coordinates: 37°17′54″N 90°15′14″W

Gravelton is an unincorporated community in northeastern Wayne County, in the U.S. state of Missouri. The community is on the banks of Big Creek and one mile east of the community of Cascade.

== History ==
A post office called Gravelton was established in 1868, and remained in operation until 1956. The community was named for the gravel used to construct the town's early concrete buildings.

== Notable person ==
John Henry Raney, a U.S. Representative from Missouri, was born at Gravelton in 1849.
