= Williams Township, Wayne County, Missouri =

Township in Wayne County, Missouri, U.S.

Coordinates: 36.9794°N 90.5656°W

Williams Township is an inactive township in Wayne County, in the U.S. state of Missouri.

Williams Township was erected in 1872, taking its name from William Williams, a pioneer citizen.
