= Dees Town, Missouri =

Unincorporated community in Missouri, U.S.

Coordinates: 37°03′13″N 90°32′37″W

Dees Town is an unincorporated community in Wayne County, in the U.S. state of Missouri.

The community has the last name of Davy, Elijah, and Henry Dees, pioneer citizens.
