= Logan Creek (Colusa County, California) =

Location
- Country: United States
- State: California

Physical characteristics
- Source
  - coordinates: 39°26′08″N 122°14′00″W
- Mouth
  - coordinates: 39°20′29″N 122°05′04″W
- Length: 3 mi (4.8 km)

Logan Creek is a stream in Colusa County, California. It remains in the Sacramento National Wildlife Refuge Complex for much of its 3-mile run.
