= Lowndes, Missouri =

Lowndes
- Unincorporated community
- Location within the state of Missouri
- Coordinates: 37°08′56″N 90°15′48″W
- Country: United States
- State: Missouri
- County: Wayne
- Elevation: 443 ft (135 m)
- Time zone: UTC-6 (Central (CST))
  - Summer (DST): UTC-5 (CDT)
- ZIP codes: 63951
- GNIS feature ID: 750889

Lowndes is an unincorporated community in eastern Wayne County, Missouri, United States. It is located approximately twenty miles southwest of Marble Hill, along Missouri Route E. Bear Creek flows past the north side of the community and Barnes Creek is just east of the community.

A post office called Lowndes has been in operation since 1840. The community has the name of Lowndes Henry Davis, a Missouri congressman.

== Notable person ==
- Leo Goodwin, Sr., founder of GEICO, was born here in 1886.
