= Goose Creek (Shoal Creek tributary) =

Stream in the American state of Missouri

Goose Creek is a stream in Caldwell County of Missouri. It is a tributary of Shoal Creek.

The headwaters are located at 39°35′45″N 94°10′41″W and the confluence with Shoal Creek are at 39°39′58″N 94°04′29″W.

Goose Creek was so named for the fact it was the hunting ground of geese.

== See also ==
- List of rivers of Missouri
