= Goose Creek (Iowa River tributary) =

Stream in Louisa and Washington County, Iowa, U.S.

Coordinates: 41.359190°N 91.420992°W

Goose Creek is a stream in Louisa and Washington counties, Iowa, in the United States. It is a tributary of the Iowa River.

Goose Creek was the home to a large flock of wild geese, hence the name.

== See also ==
- List of rivers of Iowa
