= Goose Creek (Fourche a Du Clos tributary) =

Stream in the U.S. state of Missouri

Goose Creek is a stream in northeastern St. Francois and northern Ste Genevieve counties in the U.S. state of Missouri. It is a tributary of Fourche a Du Clos.

The stream headwaters arise approximately one mile west of French Village in St. Francois County at 37°59′1.00″N 90°21′50.00″W and it flows eastward through Goose Creek Lake and into Ste. Genevieve County. The stream continues for approximately 2.5 miles to its confluence with the Fourche a Du Clos adjacent to Missouri Route Y approximately three miles west of Bloomsdale at 37°59′52.19″N 90°16′27.43″W.

Goose Creek was so named on account of wild geese in the area.

== See also ==
- List of rivers of Missouri
