= Virginia Settlement, Missouri =

Unincorporated community in Missouri, U.S.

Coordinates: 37°11′23″N 90°38′07″W

Virginia Settlement is an unincorporated community in Wayne County, in the U.S. state of Missouri.

== History ==
The first settlement at Virginia Settlement was made in the 1830s. A post office called Virginia Settlement was established in 1862, and was discontinued within that same year. The community was named for the fact a large share of the first settlers were natives of Virginia.
