= Burbank, Missouri =

Unincorporated community in Missouri, U.S.

Coordinates: 37°08′49″N 90°22′13″W

Burbank is an unincorporated community in Wayne County, in the U.S. state of Missouri. The community is located on Missouri Route E, approximately 2.5 miles east-northeast of Greenville.

== History ==
A post office called Burbank was established in 1908, and remained in operation until 1954. The community has the name of Luther Burbank, a botanist.
