= White Hollow (Iron County, Missouri) =

Valley in Missouri, United States

Coordinates: 37.406162°N 90.589841°W

White Hollow is a valley in Iron County in the U.S. state of Missouri.

White Hollow has the name of the local White family.
