= Goose Creek (Saline Creek tributary) =

Stream in the American state of Missouri

Coordinates: 37°33′30″N 90°15′55″W

Goose Creek is a stream in Madison County in the U.S. state of Missouri. It is a tributary of Saline Creek.

Goose Creek was so named on account of geese which were abundant near its course.

== See also ==
- List of rivers of Missouri
