= Goose Creek (Indian Creek tributary) =

Stream in the American state of Missouri

Coordinates: 38.11773°N 90.96682°W

Goose Creek is a stream in Washington County in the U.S. state of Missouri. It is a tributary of Indian Creek.

Goose Creek most likely was so named on account of geese near its course.

== See also ==
- List of rivers of Missouri
