= Ladera (disambiguation) =

Ladera (from Spanish ladera 'hillside') may refer to:

== Places ==
- Ladera, California, in San Mateo County
- Ladera Heights, California in Los Angeles County
- Ladera Ranch, California in Orange County
- Neighborhoods in various cities called (La) Ladera:
  - in Mexico City: List of neighborhoods in Mexico City
  - in Chapa de Mota, State of Mexico, Mexico
  - in Santa Ana Maya, Michoacán, Mexico
  - in Ayotlán, Jalisco, Mexico
  - in Ocozocoautla de Espinosa, Chiapas, Mexico
  - in Medellín, Colombia
    - León de Greiff Library, also known as La Ladera Parque Biblioteca
    - La cárcel celular de La Ladera, a former prison

== People ==
- Julián Ladera, Venezuelan professional baseball player
- Ladera, a character in the 1995 film Galaxis

== Other ==
- Ladera, a category of dishes in Ottoman cuisine made with olive oil
- Ladera Sandstone, a geologic formation in California
- Battle of La Ladera, Colombia, 1828
