= Leeper, Missouri =

Leeper
- Unincorporated community
- Location within the state of Missouri
- Coordinates: 37°04′30″N 90°42′28″W
- Country: United States
- State: Missouri
- County: Wayne
- Elevation: 489 ft (149 m)
- Time zone: UTC−6 (Central (CST))
  - Summer (DST): UTC−5 (CDT)
- GNIS feature ID: 750680

Leeper is an unincorporated community in southwestern Wayne County, Missouri, United States. It is located on the Black River, approximately five miles south of Piedmont at the intersection of Routes 34 and 49.

== History ==
Leeper is named after William T. Leeper, who served as a Captain in the Union Army during the Civil War. In 1871, Leeper convinced the Iron Mountain Railroad to run through his property, although the route would require a cut through two mountains. By 1872, Clarkson Sawmill had moved to Leeper and set up a shop. This immediately caused the rise of Leeper as a "boom-town." Leeper was not actually a town until 1874, by William T. Leeper's son Sid. By 1881, Leeper was a bona fide town with a rail station and a post office, and was commonly called Leeper Station. Leeper had then one hotel and four stores. Leeper's hotel, the Ozark Hotel, was considered one of the most elaborate resorts in Southeast Missouri during the early 20th century.

Andy Clark, a black man, was lynched in Leeper on January 21, 1903.

One of Leeper's more famous residents is Jessie Beard Rickly. She was born in Leeper in 1895 and in her teens persuaded her parents to allow her to move to St. Louis to study art.

Although not originating from Leeper, one of the most famous people to ever come to Leeper was George Sisler, also known as Gorgeous George, a baseball player for the St. Louis Browns. Sisler held the MLB record for most base hits in a season from 1920 to 2004. One year, Sisler came to Leeper to visit his friend Herman Radke and do some quail hunting. It was common for Radke to load the hunters up in his Ford truck and drive down the railroad tracks. One evening, while waiting for the train to pass, Radke, Dr. Owens, Sisler and Paul Simmons all waited in the station. Dr. Owens found a deck of playing cards and the men began to gamble on a game of poker. A short time into their game, three men, two of which were armed, barged into the station wearing masks. The three masked men began to rob the poker players of money, jewelry, and anything of value. Paul Simmons pleaded with the masked men to let him keep his wedding ring, to which they obliged. Sisler, on the other hand, turned his around and hid it. Leeper being a small town, Dr. Owens, noticed one of the coats on the masked men. After the masked men left, Dr. Owens alerted authorities and the three men were apprehended. But during the court trial, for which Sisler had to travel back twice, the Judge determined that the men's gambling, no matter how small, was illegal. The robbers were therefore declared innocent and set free.

== W.T. Leeper ==
William Thomas Leeper was born in Kentucky and moved to Wayne County in 1857. He purchased 225 acres (0.91 km^{2}) in what is present day Mill Spring and Leeper. When the Civil War was on the verge of breaking out, Leeper was strongly opposed to Missouri joining the Confederates in battle. He founded Company D of the Twelfth Regiment of Missouri Militia. The unit, with Leeper in command, hunted for Southern sympathizers. His hunt included mass killings of unarmed men. He allegedly burned villages, cities, and homes. One such story involved the killing of 29 men, referred to as the McGee Massacre or Mingo Swamp Massacre. Leeper and his men sneaked to a house that these Southern sympathizers were staying that night. The McGee clan had just abandoned the Confederate Army to return home to protect their families from Leeper. While the Confederates inside the house sat unarmed, Leeper and his men opened fire. All 29 men died, including Daniel McGee. It is said that he was shot so many times that his torso was almost severed in half.

Another alleged event occurred on March 1, 1865. In Arkansas, seven Confederate soldiers surrendered to the Union. They were then shot and killed and brought back to Wayne County. It is believed that Leeper personally knew these men. A monument to the seven soldiers can be found at Cowan Cemetery in Wayne County.

Leeper was famous for his take-no-prisoners orders. When his own farm was ransacked with his family home, he made it a personal goal to hunt down all responsible. During the battle of Pilot Knob, Leeper, with direct orders from the general, searched for guerrillas and scouts, and sent several letters back recounting each kill in detail. He was eventually found incompetent and released from the Army.

After his release from the Union Army, Leeper stayed in contact with his former unit, and even helped to organize the burning of Doniphan, Missouri. Only one person from the unit was not given amnesty for the crimes committed during the war.

After the war, Leeper served as a member in the 25th Assembly of Missouri. He died May 19, 1912, and is buried in Wayne County.

Although he is associated with some of the cruelest guerrilla hunt-downs in Missouri and Arkansas, he is credited with persuading the railroad to be built through Leeper, served on the Committee for Education, and helped expand rural schools in Wayne County.
