= Patterson, Missouri =

Patterson
- Unincorporated community
- Location within the state of Missouri
- Coordinates: 37°11′18″N 90°33′02″W
- Country: United States
- State: Missouri
- County: Wayne
- Elevation: 433 ft (132 m)
- Time zone: UTC-6 (Central (CST))
  - Summer (DST): UTC-5 (CDT)
- ZIP code: 63956
- Area code: 573
- GNIS feature ID: 751509

Patterson is an unincorporated community in northwest Wayne County, Missouri, United States. It is located approximately 7.5 miles east of Piedmont on Route 34.

== History ==
A post office called Patterson has been in operation since 1851. The community has the name of George and William Patterson, pioneer citizens.

Fort Benton, a nearby historic Civil War fortification, and the Sam A. Baker State Park Historic District are listed on the National Register of Historic Places.

Clark Mountain is located due west of Patterson while Aley Mountain is located northwest of Patterson.

== Notable people ==
- Richard P. Bland, Missouri congressman and former Dean of the United States House of Representatives
