= Cascade, Missouri =

Cascade
- Unincorporated community
- Location within the state of Missouri
- Coordinates: 37°17′58″N 90°16′09″W
- Country: United States
- State: Missouri
- County: Wayne
- Elevation: 525 ft (160 m)
- Time zone: UTC-6 (Central (CST))
  - Summer (DST): UTC-5 (CDT)
- ZIP codes: old 63632 closed in 2004 or 05
- GNIS feature ID: 715465

Cascade is an unincorporated community in northeastern Wayne County, Missouri, United States. It is located on Missouri Supplemental Route M, approximately eighteen miles west of Marble Hill. The community is on Little Creek, just south of Big Creek. The community of Gravelton is one mile to the east of Cascade on Big Creek.

== History ==
A post office called Cascade was in operation from 1910 until 2005 at its closing. The community was named for a series of waterfalls near the original town site.
