= Coldwater, Missouri =

Coldwater
- Unincorporated community
- Location within the state of Missouri
- Coordinates: 37°18′12″N 90°24′35″W
- Country: United States
- State: Missouri
- County: Wayne
- Elevation: 492 ft (150 m)
- Time zone: UTC-6 (Central (CST))
  - Summer (DST): UTC-5 (CDT)
- GNIS feature ID: 716084

Coldwater is an unincorporated community in northern Wayne County, Missouri, United States. It is located just east of U.S. Route 67, approximately seventeen miles south of Fredericktown and one mile south of the Madison-Wayne county line. The community is on Cedar Creek about three miles west of the St. Francis River.

A post office called Cold Water was established in 1848, the name was changed to Coldwater in 1894, and the post office closed in 1967. The community was named for a spring near the original town site.
