= Williamsville, Missouri =

- City
- Location of Williamsville, Missouri
- Coordinates: 36°58′22″N 90°32′53″W
- Country: United States
- State: Missouri
- County: Wayne

Area
  - Total: 0.32 sq mi (0.84 km^{2})
  - Land: 0.32 sq mi (0.84 km^{2})
  - Water: 0 sq mi (0.00 km^{2})
- Elevation: 400 ft (120 m)

Population (2020)
  - Total: 279
  - Density: 862.9/sq mi (333.15/km^{2})
- Time zone: UTC-6 (Central (CST))
  - Summer (DST): UTC-5 (CDT)
- ZIP code: 63967
- Area code: 573
- FIPS code: 29-80026
- GNIS feature ID: 2397321

Williamsville is a city in Wayne County, Missouri, United States, along the Black River. The population was 279 at the 2020 census.

== History ==
Williamsville was platted in 1871 when the railroad was extended to that point. A post office called williamsville has been in operation since 1873. The community's name is most likely derived from that of William Williams, the original owner of the town site.

== Geography ==
According to the United States Census Bureau, the city has a total area of 0.32 square miles (0.83 km^{2}), all land.

== Demographics ==
Historical population
Census	Pop.	Note	%±
1880	184		—
1890	435		136.4%
1900	215		−50.6%
1910	477		121.9%
1920	448		−6.1%
1930	428		−4.5%
1940	511		19.4%
1950	492		−3.7%
1960	412		−16.3%
1970	398		−3.4%
1980	418		5.0%
1990	391		−6.5%
2000	379		−3.1%
2010	342		−9.8%
2020	279		−18.4%
U.S. Decennial Census

=== 2010 census ===
As of the census of 2010, there were 342 people, 148 households, and 98 families living in the city. The population density was 1,068.8 inhabitants per square mile (412.7/km^{2}). There were 188 housing units at an average density of 587.5 per square mile (226.8/km^{2}). The racial makeup of the city was 98.2% White, 0.3% African American, 0.3% Native American, and 1.2% from two or more races. Hispanic or Latino of any race were 0.9% of the population.

There were 148 households, of which 28.4% had children under the age of 18 living with them, 44.6% were married couples living together, 13.5% had a female householder with no husband present, 8.1% had a male householder with no wife present, and 33.8% were non-families. 29.7% of all households were made up of individuals, and 15.5% had someone living alone who was 65 years of age or older. The average household size was 2.31 and the average family size was 2.80.

The median age in the city was 44.5 years. 19.6% of residents were under the age of 18; 7.9% were between the ages of 18 and 24; 23.1% were from 25 to 44; 29.2% were from 45 to 64; and 20.2% were 65 years of age or older. The gender makeup of the city was 50.6% male and 49.4% female.

=== 2000 census ===
As of the census of 2000, there were 379 people, 161 households, and 108 families living in the city. The population density was 1,228.1 inhabitants per square mile (474.2/km^{2}). There were 190 housing units at an average density of 615.7 per square mile (237.7/km^{2}). The racial makeup of the city was 99.74% White and 0.26% Native American. Hispanic or Latino of any race were 0.26% of the population.

There were 161 households, out of which 28.6% had children under the age of 18 living with them, 54.7% were married couples living together, 10.6% had a female householder with no husband present, and 32.9% were non-families. 30.4% of all households were made up of individuals, and 19.9% had someone living alone who was 65 years of age or older. The average household size was 2.35 and the average family size was 2.87.

In the city the population was spread out, with 24.8% under the age of 18, 7.1% from 18 to 24, 24.8% from 25 to 44, 20.3% from 45 to 64, and 23.0% who were 65 years of age or older. The median age was 39 years. For every 100 females there were 93.4 males. For every 100 females age 18 and over, there were 87.5 males.

The median income for a household in the city was $21,111, and the median income for a family was $28,125. Males had a median income of $21,667 versus $20,288 for females. The per capita income for the city was $14,844. About 19.5% of families and 25.0% of the population were below the poverty line, including 38.1% of those under age 18 and 17.4% of those age 65 or over.
