= Bear Creek (Castor River tributary) =

Stream in Missouri, U.S.

Bear Creek Tributary to Castor River (Upper)
- Location of Bear Creek mouth Bear Creek (Castor River tributary) (the United States)

Location
- Country: United States
- State: Missouri
- Counties: Wayne; Bollinger

Physical characteristics
- Source: Wilmore Creek divide
  - location: about 3 miles southeast of Wilkinson Mountain
  - coordinates: 37°16′28.19″N 90°22′56.41″W
  - elevation: 812 ft (247 m)
- Mouth: Castor River
  - location: about 2 miles south of Factory Pond
  - coordinates: 37°09′47.19″N 90°12′6.38″W
  - elevation: 384 ft (117 m)
- Length: 21.00 mi (33.80 km)
- Basin size: 85.43 square miles (221.3 km^{2})
- Discharge
  - location: Castor River
  - average: 134.40 cu ft/s (3.806 m^{3}/s) at mouth with Castor River

Basin features
- Progression: Castor River → Headwater Diversion Channel → Mississippi River → Gulf of Mexico
- River system: Castor River
- Tributaries
  - left: McCabe Creek; Andys Creek
  - right: West Fork Bear Creek; Goose Creek; Barnes Creek
- Bridges: County Road 207A, MO 34, County Road C (x2)

Bear Creek is a stream in Bollinger and Wayne counties in the U.S. state of Missouri. It is a tributary of the Castor River.

The stream headwaters are in northern Wayne County southeast of Coldwater and the confluence with the Castor River is in western Bollinger County northwest of the community of Gipsy.

Bear Creek was so named on account of bears in the area.

== See also ==
- List of rivers of Missouri
