= Des Arc, Missouri =

Village in Iron County, Missouri, United States

- Village
- Location of Des Arc, Missouri
- Coordinates: 37°17′02″N 90°38′07″W
- Country: United States
- State: Missouri
- County: Iron

Area
  - Total: 0.21 sq mi (0.55 km^{2})
  - Land: 0.21 sq mi (0.55 km^{2})
  - Water: 0 sq mi (0.00 km^{2})
- Elevation: 538 ft (164 m)

Population (2020)
  - Total: 131
  - Density: 616.6/sq mi (238.08/km^{2})
- Time zone: UTC-6 (Central (CST))
  - Summer (DST): UTC-5 (CDT)
- ZIP code: 63636
- Area code: 573
- FIPS code: 29-19198
- GNIS feature ID: 2398715

Des Arc is a village in Iron County, Missouri, United States. The population was 131 at the 2020 census.

== History ==
Des Arc was laid out in 1871. According to folk etymology, Des Arc, meaning "the bend", was so named from a big bend in the railroad at the town site. However, the State Historical Society of Missouri believes the name may be a corruption of aux arcs, the origin of the name Ozarks. A post office called Des Arc has been in operation since 1871.

Des Arc was significantly affected by tornadoes on two separate occasions in 2025. On March 14, an EF3 tornado affected the downtown area. On May 16, an EF2 tornado affected much of the same area.

== Geography ==
According to the United States Census Bureau, the village has a total area of 0.21 square miles (0.54 km^{2}), all land.

== Demographics ==
Historical population
Census	Pop.	Note	%±
1880	94		—
1890	413		339.4%
1900	180		−56.4%
1910	287		59.4%
1920	167		−41.8%
1930	152		−9.0%
1940	399		162.5%
1950	376		−5.8%
1960	275		−26.9%
1970	222		−19.3%
1980	237		6.8%
1990	173		−27.0%
2000	187		8.1%
2010	177		−5.3%
2020	131		−26.0%
U.S. Decennial Census

=== 2010 census ===
As of the census of 2010, there were 177 people, 68 households, and 46 families residing in the village. The population density was 842.9 inhabitants per square mile (325.4/km^{2}). There were 86 housing units at an average density of 409.5 per square mile (158.1/km^{2}). The racial makeup of the village was 94.92% White, 1.69% Black or African American, 0.56% Native American, and 2.82% from two or more races.

There were 68 households, of which 38.2% had children under the age of 18 living with them, 51.5% were married couples living together, 11.8% had a female householder with no husband present, 4.4% had a male householder with no wife present, and 32.4% were non-families. 30.9% of all households were made up of individuals, and 10.3% had someone living alone who was 65 years of age or older. The average household size was 2.60 and the average family size was 3.20.

The median age in the village was 40.1 years. 28.2% of residents were under the age of 18; 7.3% were between the ages of 18 and 24; 19.7% were from 25 to 44; 31% were from 45 to 64; and 13.6% were 65 years of age or older. The gender makeup of the village was 48.0% male and 52.0% female.

=== 2000 census ===
As of the census of 2000, there were 187 people, 74 households, and 52 families residing in the village. The population density was 889.6 inhabitants per square mile (343.5/km^{2}). There were 85 housing units at an average density of 404.4 per square mile (156.1/km^{2}). The racial makeup of the village was 98.93% White, 0.53% Native American, and 0.53% from two or more races.

There were 74 households, out of which 33.8% had children under the age of 18 living with them, 56.8% were married couples living together, 9.5% had a female householder with no husband present, and 28.4% were non-families. 23.0% of all households were made up of individuals, and 10.8% had someone living alone who was 65 years of age or older. The average household size was 2.53 and the average family size was 3.00.

In the village, the population was spread out, with 27.8% under the age of 18, 2.7% from 18 to 24, 28.3% from 25 to 44, 21.4% from 45 to 64, and 19.8% who were 65 years of age or older. The median age was 39 years. For every 100 females, there were 96.8 males. For every 100 females age 18 and over, there were 98.5 males.

The median income for a household in the village was $22,917, and the median income for a family was $23,750. Males had a median income of $37,083 versus $15,000 for females. The per capita income for the village was $10,461. About 26.6% of families and 29.1% of the population were below the poverty line, including 33.9% of those under the age of 18 and 20.0% of those 65 or over.

== See also ==
- List of cities in Missouri
