= Greenville, Missouri =

City in Missouri, U.S.

- City
- Location of Greenville, Missouri
- Coordinates: 37°07′38″N 90°26′50″W
- Country: United States
- State: Missouri
- County: Wayne
- Incorporated: 1819 Area -->

Government
  - Mayor: Jason Hill

Area
  - Total: 0.68 sq mi (1.75 km^{2})
  - Land: 0.68 sq mi (1.75 km^{2})
  - Water: 0 sq mi (0.00 km^{2})
- Elevation: 436 ft (133 m)

Population (2020)
  - Total: 443
  - Density: 656.5/sq mi (253.48/km^{2})
- Time zone: UTC-6 (Central (CST))
  - Summer (DST): UTC-5 (CDT)
- ZIP code: 63944
- Area code: 573
- FIPS code: 29-29476
- GNIS feature ID: 2394997

Greenville is a city in and the county seat of Wayne County, Missouri, United States, that is located on U.S. Route 67 near the intersection with Route D and E along the St. Francis River. The population was 443 at the 2020 census. Greenville was incorporated and founded as the county seat of Wayne County in 1819.

== History ==
Greenville was named after Fort Greene Ville (now Greenville), Ohio, the site where General Anthony Wayne signed a treaty with the Native Americans after defeating them in the Battle of Fallen Timbers on August 20, 1794. This was the final battle of the Northwest Indian War. Wayne County was named for this military hero and Greenville was named for the place he was most famous for. Incidentally, Fort Greene Ville, Ohio, was named after Nathanael Greene, a friend of Wayne.

In 1826, Greenville flooded. On August 10, 1832, the first post office opened. Confederate Brigadier General William J. Hardee and officers Patrick Cleburne, Thomas C. Hindman, and Basil W. Duke along with about 800 men were stationed close to Greenville near the outset of the Civil War until they began to retreat to Randolph County, Arkansas on August 28, 1861. On July 20, 1862, a camp of two companies of the 12th Missouri State Militia was attacked at daylight, surprising the camp, taking most of their rifles, 16 Savage revolvers, all of their horses, 50 pairs of holster pistols, and killing four of their men.

Greenville was incorporated as a village on February 23, 1893. In 1941, the village was relocated two miles to the north after the construction of Lake Wappapello.

Old Greenville (23WE637) was listed on the National Register of Historic Places in 1990.

== Geography ==
Greenville is located on the southern edge of the Ozark Mountains, situated in a hilly, forested landscape. U.S. Route 67 passes through Greenville. According to the United States Census Bureau, the city has a total area of 0.68 square miles (1.76 km^{2}), all land. Greenville is on the east shore of Lake Wappapello, on the St. Francis River.

== Demographics ==
Historical population
Census	Pop.	Note	%±
1880	100		—
1900	1,051		—
1910	914		−13.0%
1920	614		−32.8%
1930	506		−17.6%
1940	572		13.0%
1950	270		−52.8%
1960	282		4.4%
1970	328		16.3%
1980	393		19.8%
1990	437		11.2%
2000	451		3.2%
2010	511		13.3%
2020	443		−13.3%

=== 2010 census ===
As of the census of 2010, there were 511 people, 192 households, and 121 families living in the city. The population density was 751.5 inhabitants per square mile (290.2/km^{2}). There were 234 housing units at an average density of 344.1 per square mile (132.9/km^{2}). The racial makeup of the city was 97.7% White, 0.2% African American, 0.4% Native American, 0.2% Asian, and 1.6% from two or more races. Hispanic or Latino of any race were 1.2% of the population.

There were 192 households, of which 31.3% had children under the age of 18 living with them, 47.9% were married couples living together, 12.0% had a female householder with no husband present, 3.1% had a male householder with no wife present, and 37.0% were non-families. 34.4% of all households were made up of individuals, and 16.7% had someone living alone who was 65 years of age or older. The average household size was 2.40 and the average family size was 3.10.

The median age in the city was 45.9 years. 21.7% of residents were under the age of 18; 7.3% were between the ages of 18 and 24; 20% were from 25 to 44; 27% were from 45 to 64; and 24.1% were 65 years of age or older. The gender makeup of the city was 47.2% male and 52.8% female.

=== 2000 census ===
As of the census of 2000, there were 451 people, 190 households, and 113 families living in the city. The population density was 674.3 inhabitants per square mile (260.3/km^{2}). There were 222 housing units at an average density of 331.9 per square mile (128.1/km^{2}). The racial makeup of the city was 98.67% White, 0.22% Native American, and 1.11% from two or more races. Hispanic or Latino of any race were 1.33% of the population.

There were 190 households, of which 28.9% had children under the age of 18 living with them, 47.4% were married couples living together, 10.0% had a female householder with no husband present, and 40.5% were non-families. 37.4% of all households were made up of individuals, and 22.1% had someone living alone who was 65 years of age or older. The average household size was 2.16 and the average family size was 2.85. It was reported that in Greenville, 1.1% of all households contain lesbians.

For people in the city aged 15 and over, 60.1% were married, 9.8% were divorced, 15.5% were single, never married, 11.9% were widowed, and 2.6% were separated.

In the city, the population was spread out, with 21.3% under the age of 18, 7.8% from 18 to 24, 25.5% from 25 to 44, 20.2% from 45 to 64, and 25.3% who were 65 years of age or older. The median age was 42 years. For every 100 females, there were 72.8 males. For every 100 females age 18 and over, there were 67.5 males.

The median income for a household in the city was $28,214, and the median income for a family was $39,375, and therefore lies at more than 30% below the national average. Males had a median income of $27,500 versus $17,656 for females. The per capita income for the city was $16,802. About 13.1% of families and 14.2% of the population were below the poverty line, including 20.4% of those under age 18 and 11.0% of those age 65 or over.

== Education ==
The Greenville R-2 School District runs throughout most of eastern Wayne County. There are two elementary schools—Greenville Elementary School and Williamsville Elementary School located in the nearby town of Williamsville for pre-kindergarten through sixth-grade students. Greenville Jr. High School (grades 7–8) and Greenville High School (grades 9–12) compose the remainder of the district. There are 762 students and 57 teachers in grades K-12 in the district. The school colors are red and black and its mascot is the bear. School athletics consist of boys' and girls' basketball, girls' volleyball, boys' baseball, girls' softball, and cheerleading.

For adults aged 25 and older in Greenville, 26.7% possess a high school diploma or GED as their highest educational attainment and 5.5% possess a bachelor's degree or higher educational degree while 2.4% of the population possesses a post-graduate or professional degree.

== Media ==
The single local newspaper is the weekly Wayne County Journal Banner. The Greenville Sun newspaper was published from 1893 to 1966.

== Notable person ==
- Nelson McDowell (1870–1947), actor who appeared in over 175 films

== See also ==
- List of cities in Missouri
