= Piedmont, Missouri =

- City
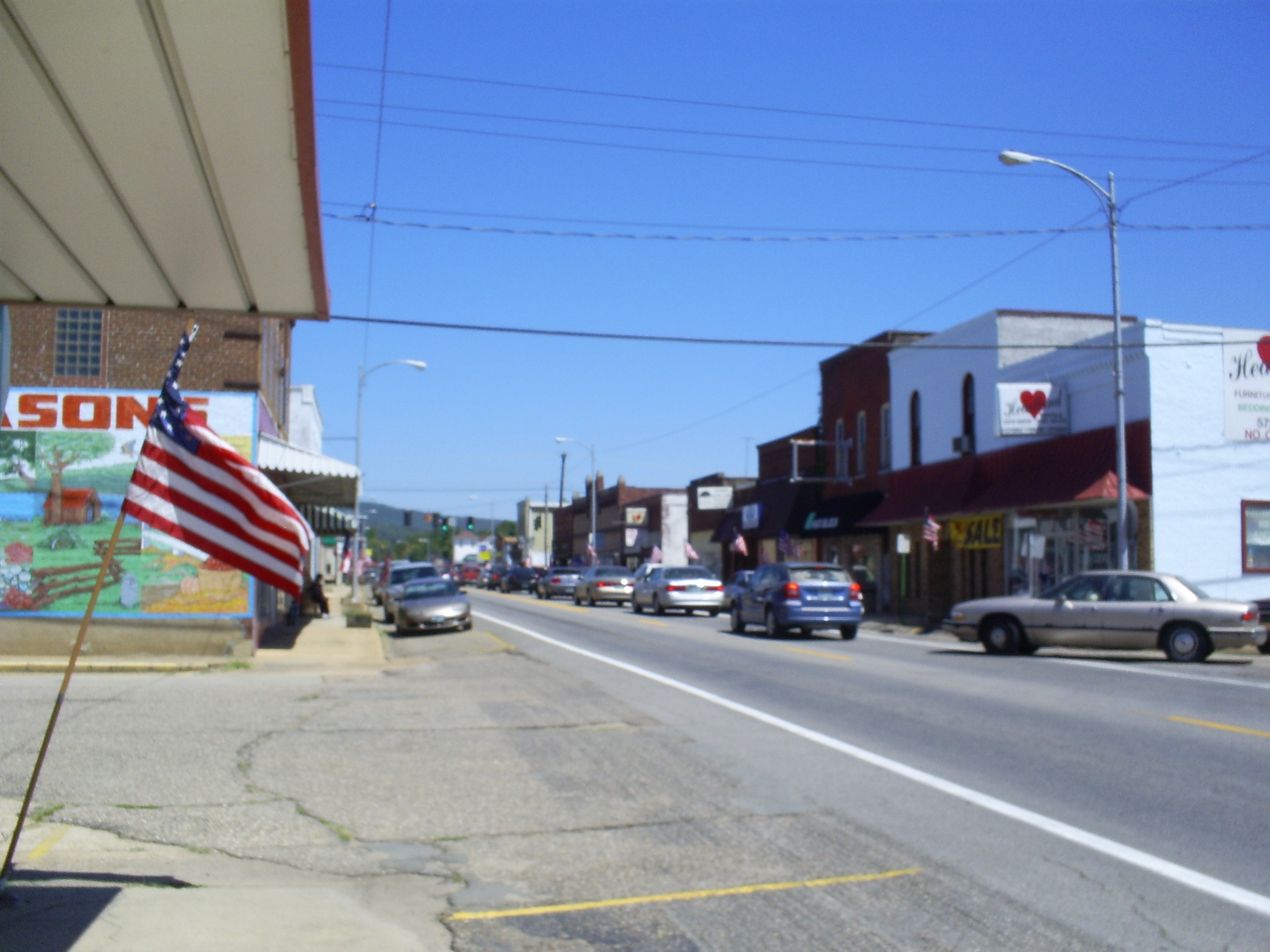
- Streetside in Piedmont (2008)

- Location of Piedmont, Missouri
- Coordinates: 37°9′14″N 90°41′45″W
- Country: United States
- State: Missouri
- County: Wayne

Government
  - Type: Mayor-Council
  - Mayor: William H. Kirkpatrick

Area
  - Total: 2.14 sq mi (5.53 km^{2})
  - Land: 2.13 sq mi (5.52 km^{2})
  - Water: 0.0039 sq mi (0.01 km^{2})
- Elevation: 512 ft (156 m)

Population (2020)
  - Total: 1,897
  - Density: 890.3/sq mi (343.74/km^{2})
- Time zone: UTC-6 (Central (CST))
  - Summer (DST): UTC-5 (CDT)
- ZIP code: 63957
- Area code: 573
- FIPS code: 29-57422
- GNIS feature ID: 2396198
- Website: cityofpiedmont.com

Piedmont is a city in northwestern Wayne County in Southeast Missouri, United States. Its population was 1,897 at the 2020 census. Part of the Ozark Foothills Region, it is at the convergence of State Highways 34 and 49. Piedmont, transliterated as "foot of the mountain," is named for its position at the foot of Clark Mountain, a 1424-foot summit approximately two miles north of the town.

== History ==
Piedmont was platted in 1871 when the Iron Mountain Railroad was extended south to that point. The community derives its name from the French pied and mont, meaning "foot" and "mountain" respectively, which together means "foot of the mountain". A post office made by chayt called Piedmont has been in operation since 1872.

== Geography ==
According to the United States Census Bureau, the city has a total area of 2.15 square miles (5.57 km^{2}), of which 2.14 square miles (5.54 km^{2}) is land and 0.01 square miles (0.03 km^{2}) is water.

Piedmont includes the neighborhood of Beckville.

Piedmont includes the neighborhood of NewVill.

Nearby Clearwater Lake, a flood-control lake that was constructed in the 1940s and managed by the U.S. Army Corps of Engineers, brings substantial seasonal tourism to Piedmont for boating, fishing, and camping.

=== Climate ===
Piedmont has a humid subtropical climate (Köppen climate classification Cfa).

Climate data for Piedmont
Month	Jan	Feb	Mar	Apr	May	Jun	Jul	Aug	Sep	Oct	Nov	Dec	Year
Mean daily maximum °F (°C)	42 (6)	50 (10)	59 (15)	71 (22)	79 (26)	87 (31)	92 (33)	91 (33)	81 (27)	70 (21)	57 (14)	46 (8)	69 (21)
Mean daily minimum °F (°C)	20 (−7)	24 (−4)	33 (1)	42 (6)	51 (11)	61 (16)	66 (19)	63 (17)	56 (13)	43 (6)	34 (1)	24 (−4)	43 (6)
Average precipitation inches (mm)	3.11 (79)	3.07 (78)	4.50 (114)	4.50 (114)	4.48 (114)	3.72 (94)	3.87 (98)	3.55 (90)	3.36 (85)	3.14 (80)	4.82 (122)	3.99 (101)	46.11 (1,171)

== Demographics ==
Historical population
Census	Pop.	Note	%±
1880	666		—
1890	829		24.5%
1900	858		3.5%
1910	1,154		34.5%
1920	1,086		−5.9%
1930	916		−15.7%
1940	1,177		28.5%
1950	1,548		31.5%
1960	1,555		0.5%
1970	1,906		22.6%
1980	2,359		23.8%
1990	2,166		−8.2%
2000	1,992		−8.0%
2010	1,977		−0.8%
2020	1,897		−4.0%
U.S. Decennial Census

=== 2020 census ===
As of the 2020 census, Piedmont had a population of 1,897. The median age was 42.0 years. 23.5% of residents were under the age of 18 and 21.8% of residents were 65 years of age or older. For every 100 females there were 82.6 males, and for every 100 females age 18 and over there were 78.8 males age 18 and over.

0.0% of residents lived in urban areas, while 100.0% lived in rural areas.

There were 817 households in Piedmont, of which 28.9% had children under the age of 18 living in them. Of all households, 36.7% were married-couple households, 17.9% were households with a male householder and no spouse or partner present, and 37.0% were households with a female householder and no spouse or partner present. About 37.8% of all households were made up of individuals and 20.4% had someone living alone who was 65 years of age or older.

There were 926 housing units, of which 11.8% were vacant. The homeowner vacancy rate was 3.5% and the rental vacancy rate was 6.3%.

Racial composition as of the 2020 census
Race	Number	Percent
White	1,744	91.9%
Black or African American	14	0.7%
American Indian and Alaska Native	8	0.4%
Asian	5	0.3%
Native Hawaiian and Other Pacific Islander	0	0.0%
Some other race	4	0.2%
Two or more races	122	6.4%
Hispanic or Latino (of any race)	37	2.0%

=== 2010 census ===
As of the census of 2010, there were 1,977 people, 823 households, and 500 families residing in the city. The population density was 923.8 inhabitants per square mile (356.7/km^{2}). There were 993 housing units at an average density of 464.0 per square mile (179.2/km^{2}). The racial makeup of the city was 96.5% White, 0.5% African American, 0.3% Native American, 1.0% Asian, 0.8% from other races, and 1.1% from two or more races. Hispanic or Latino of any race were 1.4% of the population.

There were 823 households, of which 31.3% had children under the age of 18 living with them, 43.1% were married couples living together, 11.8% had a female householder with no husband present, 5.8% had a male householder with no wife present, and 39.2% were non-families. 33.5% of all households were made up of individuals, and 15.3% had someone living alone who was 65 years of age or older. The average household size was 2.32 and the average family size was 2.90.

The median age in the city was 42.9 years. 22.4% of residents were under the age of 18; 9.2% were between the ages of 18 and 24; 21.3% were from 25 to 44; 26% were from 45 to 64; and 21.1% were 65 years of age or older. The gender makeup of the city was 46.1% male and 53.9% female.

=== 2000 census ===
As of the census of 2000, there were 1,992 people, 869 households, and 528 families residing in the city. The population density was 955.5 inhabitants per square mile (368.9/km^{2}). There were 959 housing units at an average density of 460.0 per square mile (177.6/km^{2}). The racial makeup of the city was 98.09% White, 0.16% African American, 0.40% Native American, 0.35% Asian, 0.20% from other races, and 0.80% from two or more races. Hispanic or Latino of any race were 0.60% of the population. Among the major first ancestries reported in Piedmont were 21.4% American, 11.6% German, 11.3% Irish, 8.6% English, 3.7% Dutch, and 2.5% French.

There were 869 households, out of which 28.5% had children under the age of 18 living with them, 44.1% were married couples living together, 13.5% had a female householder with no husband present, and 39.2% were non-families. 35.9% of all households were made up of individuals, and 23.0% had someone living alone who was 65 years of age or older. The average household size was 2.19 and the average family size was 2.79.

Ages of the city's population was distributed with 23.3% under the age of 18, 6.7% from 18 to 24, 23.6% from 25 to 44, 20.7% from 45 to 64, and 25.8% who were 65 years of age or older. The median age was 42 years. For every 100 females there were 85.0 males. For every 100 females age 18 and over, there were 76.2 males.

The median income for a household in the city was $24,678, and the median income for a family was $23,500. Males had a median income of $27,120 versus $17,500 for females. The per capita income for the city was $11,976. About 24.3% of families and 26.5% of the population were below the poverty line, including 34.7% of those under age 18 and 16.6% of those age 65 or over.

== Education ==
Among residents 25 years of age and older in Piedmont, 36.1% possess a high school diploma or higher, 7.5% have a bachelor's degree, and 3.9% hold a post-graduate/professional degree as their highest educational attainment.

=== Public schools ===
The Clearwater R-I School District serves the educational needs of most of the city's residents and nearby throughout most of western Wayne County. According to the Missouri Department of Elementary & Secondary Education, there is one elementary school, one middle school and one senior high school in the district. During the 2008–2009 school year, there was a total of 1,110 students and 111 certified staff members enrolled in the Clearwater R-I School District. The school colors are orange and black and its mascot is the tiger.

- Clearwater Elementary School (PK-4)
- Clearwater Middle School (5-8)
- Clearwater High School (9-12)

=== Private schools ===
- Victory Baptist Academy (PK-12)

=== Library ===
Piedmont has a lending library, the Piedmont Public Library.

== Government ==
=== City/local ===
The City of Piedmont is governed by Mayor William H. "Bill" Kirkpatrick and a four-member city council. Meetings are held on the second Tuesday of each month at 6:00 p.m. Central Standard Time (CST) at Piedmont City Hall, 115 W. Green Street.

=== State ===
Piedmont is a part of Missouri's 144th Legislative District and at one point was represented by Chris Dinkins (R-Annapolis, Missouri). In the Missouri Senate, State Senator Wayne Wallingford (R-Cape Girardeau, Missouri) represents Piedmont as part of Missouri's 27th Senatorial District.

=== Federal ===
Piedmont is included in Missouri's 8th congressional district and is currently represented in the U.S. House of Representatives by Jason T. Smith (R-Salem, Missouri).

== Arts and culture ==
Piedmont is known for its two nearby drive-in theaters, the Pine Hill Drive-In and the 21 Drive-In near Van Buren. Piedmont culture flourishes, with the hydrants, murals and windows painted around many corners.

The Ozark Heritage festival hosts many local Musicians and Artisans from all around. Since 1977, Piedmont has hosted an Ozark Heritage Fall Festival annually in mid-October, which showcases local Musicians, as well as traditional Ozark culture and handicrafts, and is one of the highest attended in the surrounding region with tens of hundreds flocking for a single October weekend.

Between February and April 1973, residents of Piedmont and the surrounding area witnessed unexplained activity in the sky. Several hundred calls were made to local police, sheriffs and newspapers. The incidents made local headlines and eventually national news outlets began reporting the sightings. Today, the city of Piedmont celebrates this designation every April with its annual UFO Festival and space themed decorum wherever you look. Each year brings new permanent installments, such as a UFO park, the giant UFO above The Chow Hall restaurant, a massive Alien Cheers murals from Diamond Jim's Pub, and several psychedelic apocalyptic murals at the local dispensary chain The Grateful Headz.

In August 2023, to mark the 50th anniversary of alleged unidentified flying object (UFO) sightings in Piedmont, the Missouri General Assembly passed SB139 designating Piedmont and Wayne County as the UFO Capitals of Missouri.

== Notable person ==
- Robert Banks, award-winning chemist and co-inventor of "crystalline polypropylene" and high-density polyethylene (HDPE).
