= Lake Wappapello =

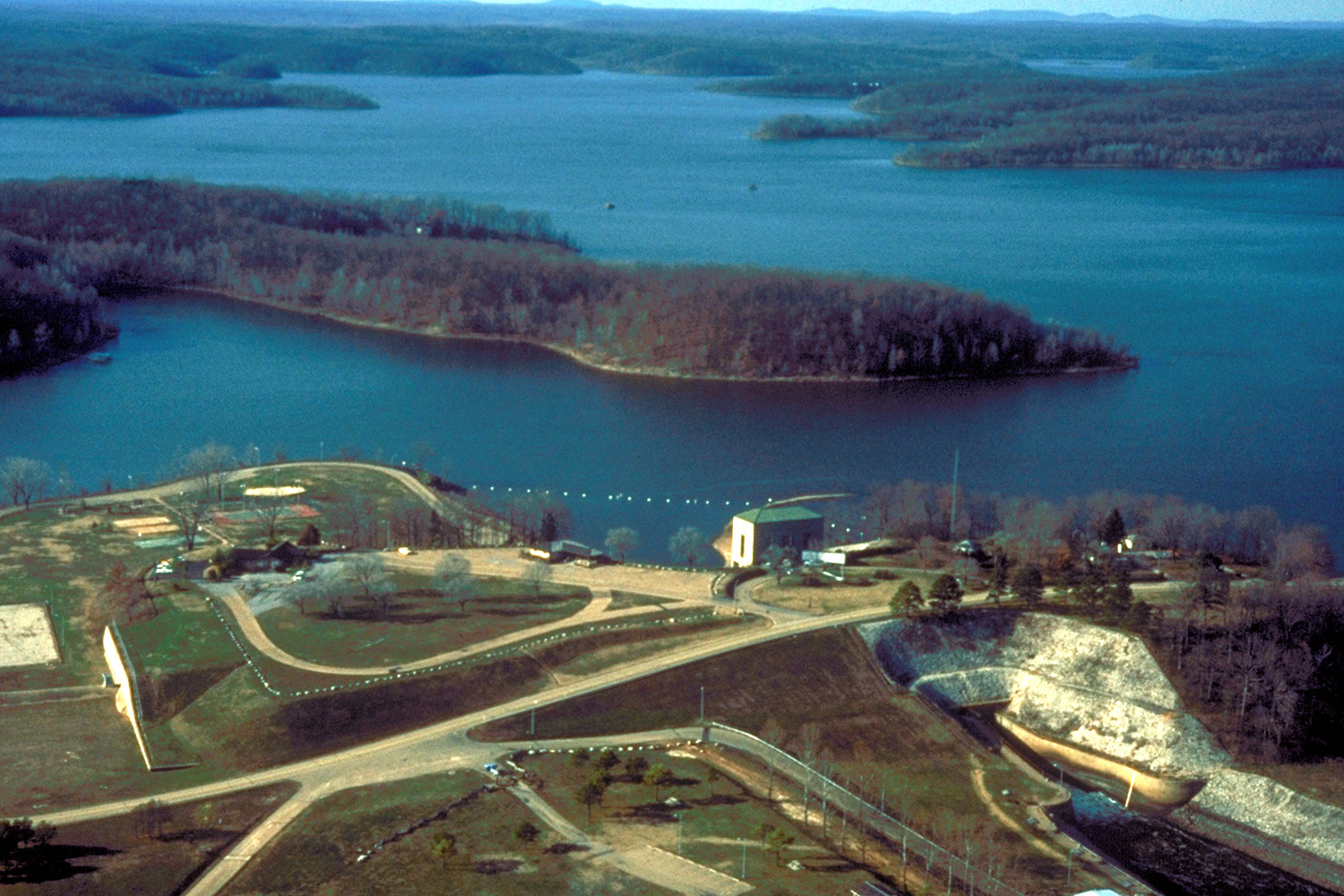

- Location within Missouri Location within the United States
- Location: Wayne / Butler counties, Missouri, United States
- Coordinates: 36°57′22″N 90°19′23″W
- Type: reservoir
- Primary inflows: St. Francis River
- Primary outflows: St. Francis River
- Basin countries: United States
- Surface area: 8,400 acres (34 km^{2})
- Average depth: 15 ft (4.6 m) main basin 3 ft (0.91 m) upper reaches
- Max. depth: 47 ft (14 m)
- Surface elevation: 358 ft (109 m)

Lake Wappapello (/ˈwɒpəpəloʊ/ WOP-ə-pəl-oh) is a reservoir on the St. Francis River, formed by Wappapello Dam (36°55′55″N 90°16′45″W). Created in 1938, this 8,400-acre (34 km^{2}) lake is located 120 miles (190 km) south of St. Louis, Missouri. The reservoir lies mostly in Wayne County, but its southernmost reaches (near the dam) extend into northern Butler County, both in Missouri. Both the dam and reservoir are owned and operated for the public by the United States Army Corps of Engineers.

Its primary purpose is flood control, although it has been developed as a recreational area with ample opportunities to boat, fish, swim or camp. The fish population of the lake include white bass, largemouth bass, crappie, and bluegill. Lake Wappapello State Park is composed of territory on the southwestern side of the lake.
