= St. Francis River =

River in Arkansas and Missouri, U.S.

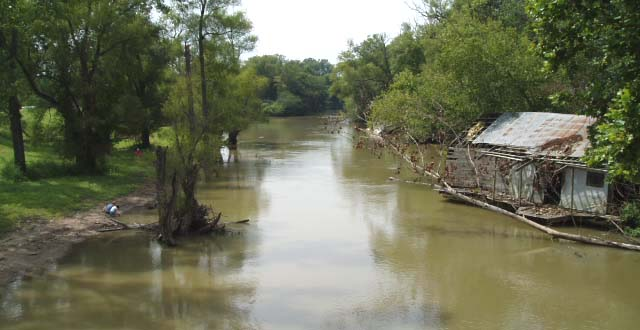
- The St. Francis River at Lake City, Arkansas is placid and silt-laden.

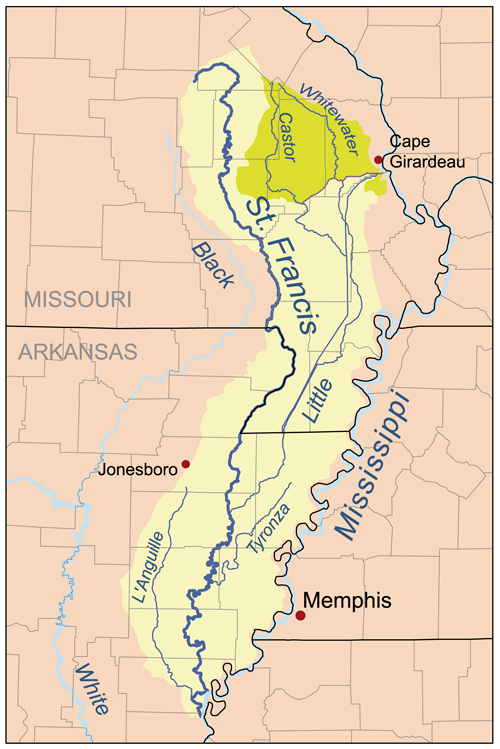
- Map of the St. Francis River watershed. The Castor/Whitewater headwaters (darker shade on the map) were historically part of the St. Francis watershed but are now diverted to the Mississippi.

Location
- Country: United States
- State: Missouri, Arkansas
- Region: Ozark Plateau, Mississippi Alluvial Plain
- District: St. Francois Mountains, Crowleys Ridge
- Cities: Farmington, Missouri, Fisk, Missouri, Lake City, Arkansas, Marked Tree, Arkansas

Physical characteristics
- Source: Elephant Rocks State Park
  - location: Iron County, St. Francois Mountains, Ozark Plateau, Missouri
  - elevation: 1,568 ft (478 m)
- Mouth: Mississippi River
  - location: Near Helena-West Helena, Phillips County, Mississippi Alluvial Plain, Arkansas
  - coordinates: 34°37′28″N 90°35′31″W
  - elevation: 171 ft (52 m)
- Length: 426 mi (686 km)
- Basin size: 7,550 sq mi (19,600 km^{2})
- Discharge
  - location: Latitude of Wittsburg
  - average: 8,976 cu ft/s (254.2 m^{3}/s)

Basin features
- Tributaries
  - left: Little St. Francis River, 12-Mile Creek, Blue Spring, Mingo Ditch, Little River
  - right: Stouts Creek, Marble Creek, Big Creek, Otter Creek, L'Anguille River

The St. Francis River is a tributary of the Mississippi River, about 426 miles (686 km) long, in southeastern Missouri and northeastern Arkansas in the United States. The river drains a mostly rural area and forms part of the Missouri-Arkansas state line along the western side of the Missouri Bootheel.

== Description and course ==
The river rises in a region of granite mountains in Iron County, Missouri, and flows generally southwardly through the Ozarks and the St. Francois Mountains near Missouri's highest point Taum Sauk. It forms the Missouri-Arkansas border in the Bootheel and eventually exits the state at Missouri's lowest point in the "toe" at 241 feet (73 m) above sea level. It passes through Lake Wappapello, which is formed by a dam constructed in 1941. Below the dam the river meanders through cane forests and willow wetlands or forested swamp, transitioning from a clear stream into a slow and silt-laden muddy river as it enters the flat lands of the Mississippi embayment. In its lower course the river parallels Crowleys Ridge and is part of a navigation and flood-control project that encompasses a network of diversion channels and ditches along it and the Castor and Little rivers. Below the mouth of the Little River in Poinsett County, Arkansas, the St. Francis is navigable by barge. It joins the Mississippi River in Phillips County, Arkansas, about 7 miles (11 km) north of Helena.

Along its course in Missouri, the river flows through the Mark Twain National Forest and past Sam A. Baker State Park and the towns of Farmington, Greenville and Fisk. In Arkansas it passes the towns of St. Francis, Lake City, Marked Tree and Parkin, and continues through two additional namesakes of the river — St. Francis County, and St. Francis Township in northeastern Phillips County — ending its course adjoining the St. Francis National Forest.

In addition to the Little River, tributaries of the St. Francis include the Little St. Francis River, which joins it along its upper course in Missouri; Wolf Creek, which joins it in Missouri; the Tyronza River, which joins it in Arkansas; and the L'Anguille River, which joins it just above its mouth.

== History ==
The river became the home of Cherokee Indians who attacked a boat on the Tennessee River on June 11, 1794, known as the Muscle Shoals Massacre and had removed to the west. The Spanish authorities allowed the Indian settlement to trade and the area flourished with a population greater than Arkansas Post.

== Names ==
The origin of the river's name is unclear. It might refer to St. Francis of Assisi, the founder of the Franciscan order. None of the region's early explorers were Franciscans, however. One possibility is that Jacques Marquette, a Jesuit, named the river when he explored its mouth in 1673. Before his voyage down the Mississippi Marquette had spent some time at the mission of St. François Xavier, named for the Jesuit missionary Francis Xavier. The spelling of the river's name shifted from "François" to "Francis" in the early 20th century. A number of place names in the region stem from the river's name, including St. Francois County and the St. Francois Mountains.

The United States Board on Geographic Names settled on "St. Francis River" as the stream's name in 1899. According to the Geographic Names Information System, historical names for the river have included:

- Cholohollay River
- El Rio San Francisco
- Fiume San Francesco
- Rio San Francisco
- Rivière Saint-François
- Rivière des Chepousseau
- San Francisco River
- St. Francois River (mentioned in the Congressional act which set the boundaries for the state including the Bootheel in Missouri)

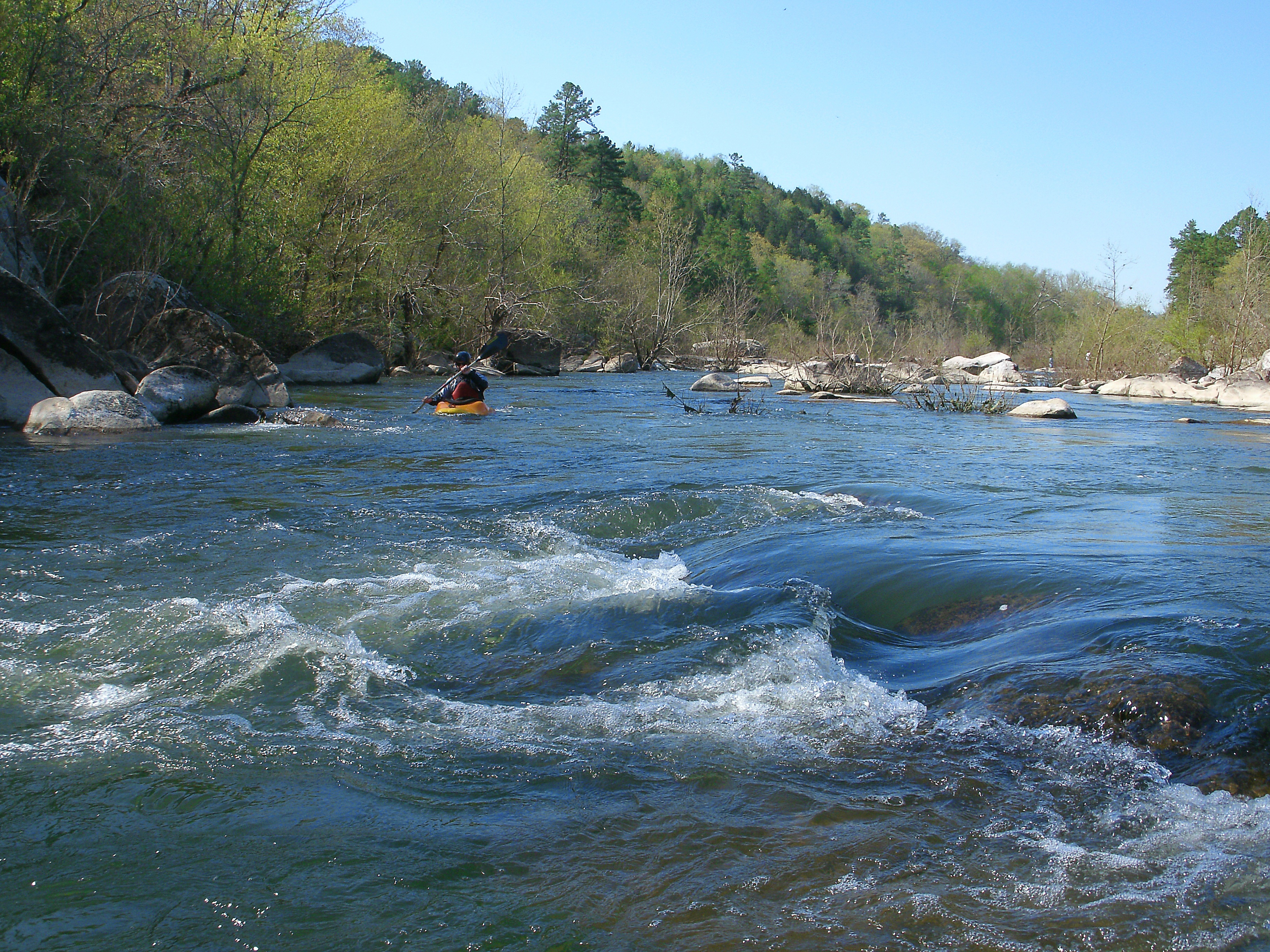
The St. Francis River rises in the granite mountains of the eastern Ozarks where it is a clear, rapid stream.

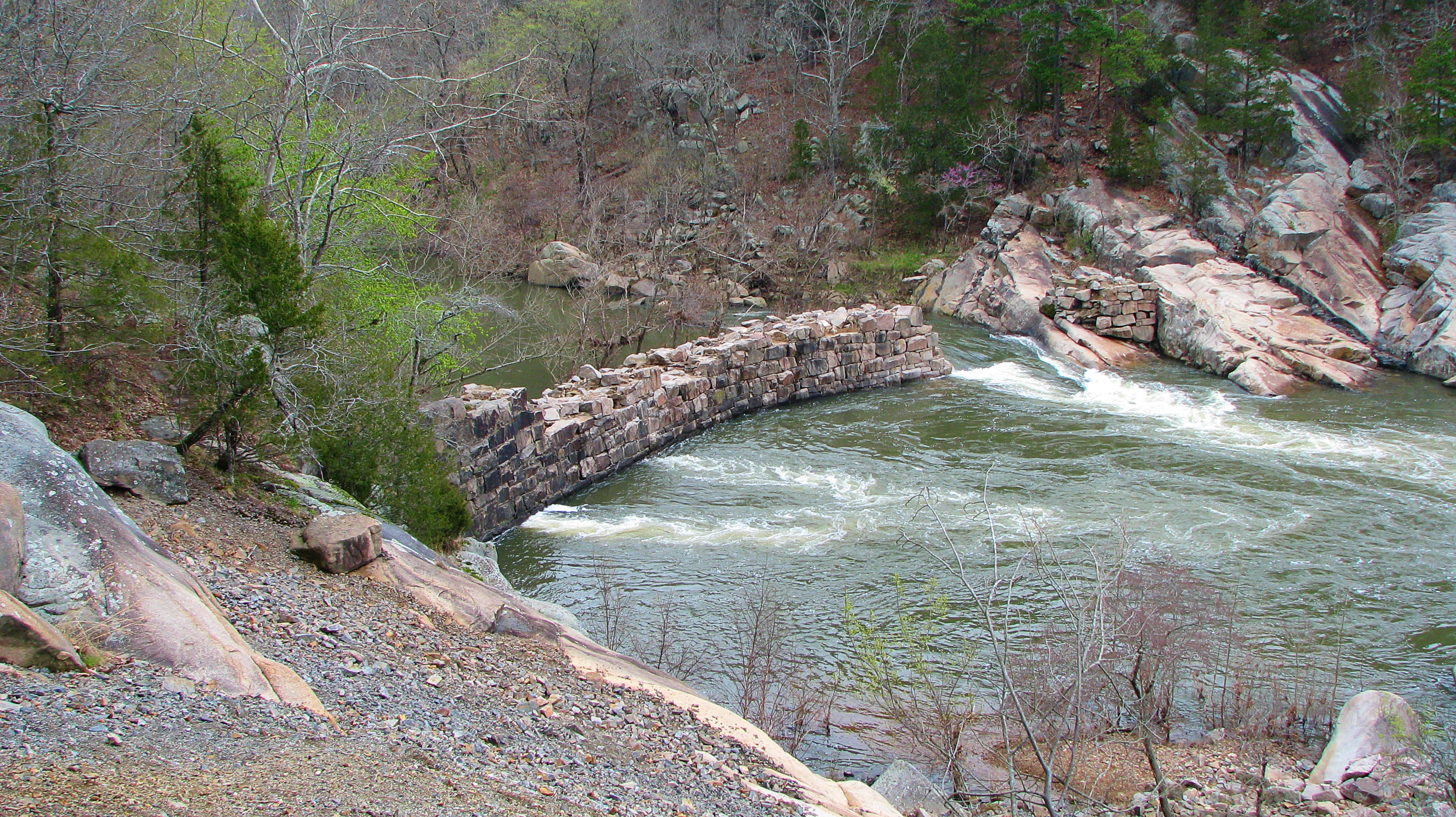
Silver Mine Dam on the upper St. Francis River

== See also ==
- List of Arkansas rivers
- List of Missouri rivers
- River borders of U.S. states
