= Wayne County, Missouri =

County in Missouri, United States

- County
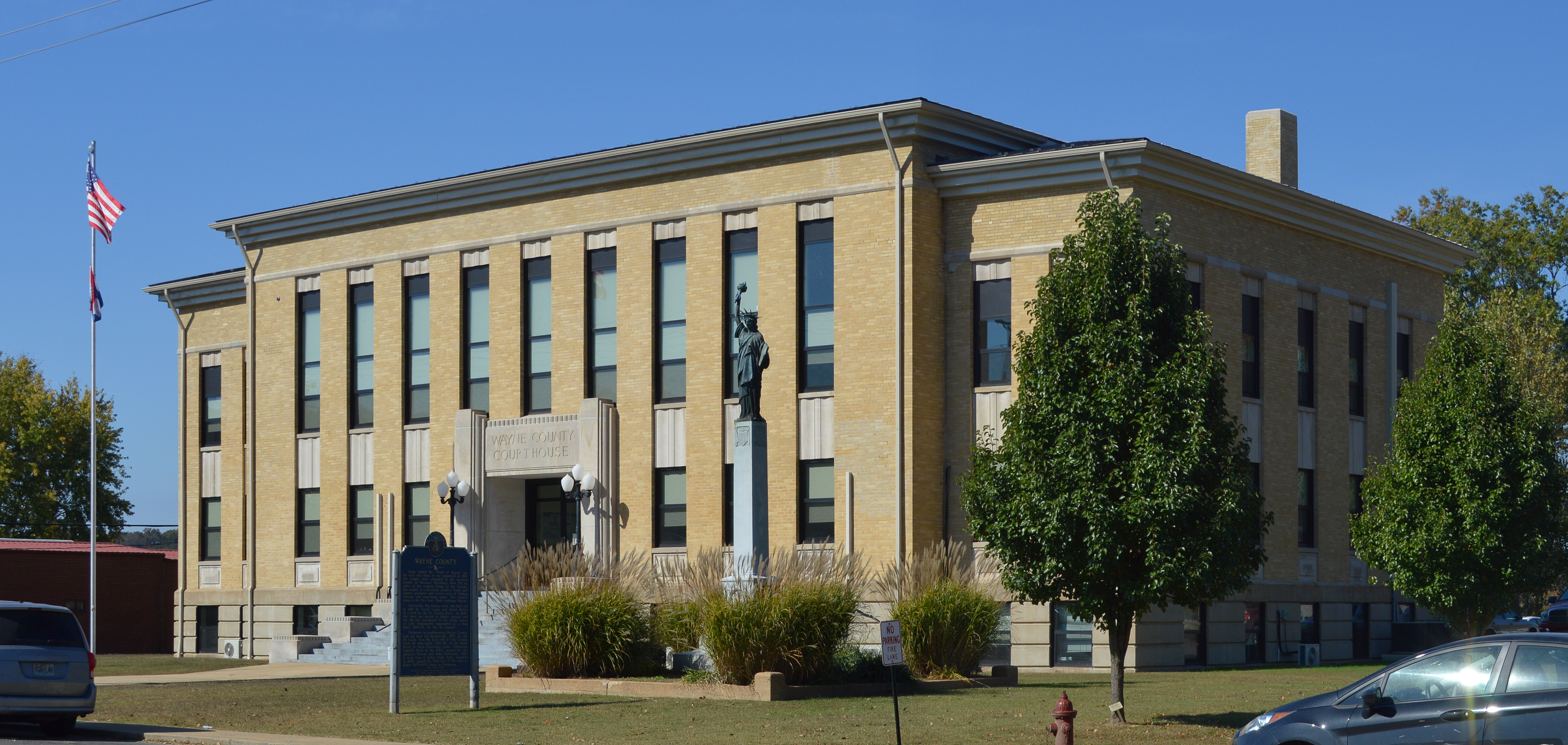
- Wayne County Courthouse in Greenville

- Location within the U.S. state of Missouri
- Coordinates: 37°07′N 90°28′W
- Country: United States
- State: Missouri
- Founded: December 11, 1818
- Named for: Anthony Wayne
- Seat: Greenville
- Largest city: Piedmont

Area
  - Total: 774 sq mi (2,000 km^{2})
  - Land: 759 sq mi (1,970 km^{2})
  - Water: 15 sq mi (39 km^{2}) 1.9%

Population (2020)
  - Total: 10,974
  - Estimate (2025): 10,782 ▼
  - Density: 14.5/sq mi (5.58/km^{2})
- Time zone: UTC−6 (Central)
  - Summer (DST): UTC−5 (CDT)
- Congressional district: 8th

Wayne County is a county located in the Ozark foothills in the U.S. state of Missouri. As of the 2020 census, the population was 10,974. The county seat is Greenville. The county was officially organized on December 11, 1818, and is named after General "Mad" Anthony Wayne, who served in the American Revolution. As of August 28, 2023, Wayne County is designated the UFO Capital of Missouri, along with the city of Piedmont.

== History ==
Wayne County was created in December 1818 by the last Missouri Territorial Legislature from portions of Cape Girardeau and Lawrence counties. Wayne County thus actually predates statehood. In March 1819, Congress established the Territory of Arkansas, and most of Lawrence County became Lawrence County, Arkansas Territory. The small strip that had been excluded was added to Wayne County by the Missouri State Constitution of 1820. The Osage Strip on the Kansas border was added in 1825. Between 1825 and 1831, Wayne County was actually larger than the states of Massachusetts, Connecticut, Rhode Island, and Delaware combined. All or part of 32 present Missouri counties once belonged to Wayne County. Despite its size, the Census of 1820 revealed that Wayne County had a total population of just 1,239 white inhabitants and 204 African American slaves.

When Wayne County was formed in 1818, the territorial legislature appointed five commissioners to govern it. They chose a small settlement called Cedar Cabin on the St. Francis River to be the county seat. Renamed Greenville, it had grown to about 1,000 by the turn of the 20th century. By 1940, however, the population had declined to 572. In 1941, the remaining inhabitants were forced to relocate because of the construction of Lake Wappapello. This new town's population had fallen to 270 in 1950, but has now increased to about 563.

The Wayne County Courthouse was destroyed by a fire in 1854. In 1866, the records in new courthouse were stolen, and in 1892 the courthouse again burned down. Thus few county records survive from that time.

Wayne County has a stream called Oscar Hollow which was renamed after its pioneer citizen Oscar Lurker.

== Geography ==
According to the U.S. Census Bureau, the county has a total area of 774 square miles (2,000 km^{2}), of which 759 square miles (1,970 km^{2}) is land and 15 square miles (39 km^{2}) (1.9%) is water.

The most populous community in Wayne County is Piedmont with a population of 2,401 people, followed by Greenville with 563 and Williamsville with 386.

=== Adjacent counties ===
- Madison County (north)
- Bollinger County (east)
- Stoddard County (southeast)
- Butler County (south)
- Carter County (southwest)
- Reynolds County (west)
- Iron County (northwest)

=== Major highways ===
- US 67
- Route 34
- Route 49
- Route 172

=== National protected areas ===
- Mark Twain National Forest (part)
- Mingo National Wildlife Refuge (part)

== Demographics ==
Historical population
Census	Pop.	Note	%±
1820	1,443		—
1830	3,264		126.2%
1840	3,403		4.3%
1850	4,518		32.8%
1860	5,629		24.6%
1870	6,068		7.8%
1880	9,096		49.9%
1890	11,927		31.1%
1900	15,309		28.4%
1910	15,181		−0.8%
1920	13,012		−14.3%
1930	12,243		−5.9%
1940	12,794		4.5%
1950	10,514		−17.8%
1960	8,638		−17.8%
1970	8,546		−1.1%
1980	11,277		32.0%
1990	11,543		2.4%
2000	13,259		14.9%
2010	13,521		2.0%
2020	10,974		−18.8%
2025 (est.)	10,782	▼	−1.7%
U.S. Decennial Census; 1790-1960 1900-1990; 1990-2000 2010-2015

=== 2020 census ===
As of the 2020 census, the county had a population of 10,974. The median age was 49.3 years. 19.3% of residents were under the age of 18 and 26.0% of residents were 65 years of age or older. For every 100 females there were 98.3 males, and for every 100 females age 18 and over there were 97.3 males age 18 and over.

The racial makeup of the county was 92.6% White, 0.5% Black or African American, 0.7% American Indian and Alaska Native, 0.2% Asian, 0.0% Native Hawaiian and Pacific Islander, 0.3% from some other race, and 5.7% from two or more races. Hispanic or Latino residents of any race comprised 1.4% of the population.

Wayne County, Missouri – Racial and ethnic composition Note: the US Census treats Hispanic/Latino as an ethnic category. This table excludes Latinos from the racial categories and assigns them to a separate category. Hispanics/Latinos may be of any race.
Race / Ethnicity (NH = Non-Hispanic)	Pop 1980	Pop 1990	Pop 2000	Pop 2010	Pop 2020	% 1980	% 1990	% 2000	% 2010	% 2020
White alone (NH)	11,166	11,437	12,899	13,053	10,093	99.02%	99.08%	97.28%	96.54%	91.97%
Black or African American alone (NH)	5	7	21	33	50	0.04%	0.06%	0.16%	0.24%	0.46%
Native American or Alaska Native alone (NH)	42	45	76	55	67	0.37%	0.39%	0.57%	0.41%	0.61%
Asian alone (NH)	6	9	15	32	23	0.05%	0.08%	0.11%	0.24%	0.21%
Native Hawaiian or Pacific Islander alone (NH)	x	x	4	2	5	x	x	0.03%	0.01%	0.05%
Other race alone (NH)	2	1	5	5	2	0.02%	0.01%	0.04%	0.04%	0.02%
Mixed race or Multiracial (NH)	x	x	174	201	579	x	x	1.31%	1.49%	5.28%
Hispanic or Latino (any race)	56	44	65	140	155	0.50%	0.38%	0.49%	1.04%	1.41%
Total	11,277	11,543	13,259	13,521	10,974	100.00%	100.00%	100.00%	100.00%	100.00%

0.0% of residents lived in urban areas, while 100.0% lived in rural areas.

There were 4,756 households in the county, of which 23.5% had children under the age of 18 living with them and 25.2% had a female householder with no spouse or partner present. About 32.3% of all households were made up of individuals and 17.5% had someone living alone who was 65 years of age or older.

There were 6,109 housing units, of which 22.1% were vacant. Among occupied housing units, 75.5% were owner-occupied and 24.5% were renter-occupied. The homeowner vacancy rate was 2.3% and the rental vacancy rate was 8.2%.

=== 2010 census ===
As of the 2010 Census, there were 13,521 people, 5,717 households, and 3,850 families residing in the county. The population density was 18 people per square mile (6.9 people/km^{2}). There were 8,083 housing units at an average density of 11 units per square mile (4.2/km^{2}).

The racial makeup of the county was 97% White, 0.7% Black or African American, 0.4% Native American, 0.1% Asian, 0% Pacific Islander, 0% from other races, and 1.8% from two or more races. 1.5% of the population were Hispanic or Latino of any race.

There were 5,717 households, out of which 23.2% had children under the age of 18 living with them, 52.7% were husband-wife families. 32.7% were non-families. 27.7% of all households were made up of individuals, and 13% had someone living alone who was 65 years of age or older. The average household size was 2.34 and the average family size was 2.82.

In the county, the population was spread out, with 23.1% under the age of 19, 5% from 20 to 24, 14.2% from 25 to 39, 36.4% from 40 to 64, and 21.4% who were 65 years of age or older. The median age was 45.8 years.

The median income for a household in the county was $33,954, and the median income for a family was $39,419. Males had a median income of $26,048 versus $18,250 for females. The per capita income for the county was $18,378. About 15.8% of families and 23% of the population were below the poverty line, including 31.9% of those under age 18 and 12.7% of those age 65 or over.

=== 2000 census ===
According to the 2000 Census, the most common first ancestries reported in Wayne County were 32.9% American, 15.0% German, 11.9% English, 11.7% Irish, 3.0% French (excluding Basque), 2.0% Dutch and 2.0% Italian.

=== Religion ===
According to the Association of Religion Data Archives County Membership Report (2000), Wayne County is a part of the Bible Belt with evangelical Protestantism being the majority religion. The most predominant denominations among residents in Wayne County who adhere to a religion are Baptists (62.76%), Methodists (10.08%), and Roman Catholics (7.07%).

== Politics ==
=== Local ===
The Republican Party dominates politics at the local level in Wayne County and controls all offices.

Wayne County, Missouri

Elected countywide officials
Assessor	Frances Huitt	Republican
Circuit Clerk	Darren T. Garrison	Republican
County Clerk	Rhonda Crum	Republican
Collector	Tammy Morgan	Republican
Commissioner (presiding)	Brian M. Polk	Republican
Commissioner (district 1)	Doug Wood	Republican
Commissioner (district 2)	Steve Foster	Republican
Coroner	Mark Smith	Republican
Prosecuting Attorney	Ginger Joynor	Republican
Public Administrator	Dianne Webb	Republican
Recorder	Cindy Stout	Republican
Sheriff	Kyle Shearrer	Republican
Treasurer	Amber Sturgeon	Republican

=== State ===
Wayne County is divided among two legislative districts in the Missouri House of Representatives.

- District 144 – Currently represented by Chris Dinkins (R)-Lesterville.
- District 153 – Currently represented by Darrell Atchison (R)-Williamsville.

All of Wayne County is a part of Missouri's 27th District in the Missouri Senate and is currently represented by Holly Thompson Rehder (R)-Sikeston.

Missouri Senate – District 27 – Wayne County (2020)
Party	Candidate	Votes	%	±%
Republican	Holly Rehder	4,684	82.81%	
Democratic	Donnie Owens	972	17.19%	

Missouri Senate – District 27 – Wayne County (2016)
Party	Candidate	Votes	%	±%
Republican	Wayne Wallingford	3,956	73.60%	
Democratic	Donnie Owens	1,419	26.40%	

Past Gubernatorial Elections Results
Year	Republican	Democratic	Third Parties
2024	85.54% 4,906	12.71% 729	1.74% 100
2020	82.60% 4,801	15.50% 900	1.60% 93
2016	72.00% 4,098	25.00% 1,425	1.40% 80
2012	46.82% 2,642	50.77% 2,865	2.41% 136
2008	44.62% 2,727	53.49% 3,269	1.88% 115
2004	58.84% 3,649	39.86% 2,472	1.31% 81
2000	51.84% 3,008	46.25% 2,684	1.92% 111
1996	42.84% 2,421	55.11% 3,114	2.05% 116
1992	42.65% 2,493	57.35% 3,352	2.05% 116
1988	60.16% 3,047	39.76% 2,014	0.08% 4
1984	53.79% 2,787	46.21% 2,394	0.00% 0
1980	51.05% 2,769	48.89% 2,652	0.06% 3
1976	49.37% 2,428	50.61% 2,489	0.02% 1

=== Federal ===
Wayne County is included in Missouri's 8th Congressional District and is currently represented by Jason T. Smith (R-Salem) in the U.S. House of Representatives. Smith won a special election on Tuesday, June 4, 2013, to finish out the remaining term of U.S. Representative Jo Ann Emerson (R-Cape Girardeau). Emerson announced her resignation a month after being reelected with over 70 percent of the vote in the district. She resigned to become CEO of the National Rural Electric Cooperative.

U.S. House of Representatives - District 8 – Wayne County (2012)
Party	Candidate	Votes	%	±%
Republican	Jo Ann Emerson	4,232	74.65	+5.61
Democratic	Jack Rushin	1,311	23.13	−4.40
Libertarian	Rick Vandeven	126	2.22	+1.07

U.S. House of Representatives - District 8 - Special Election – Wayne County (2013)
Party	Candidate	Votes	%	±%
Republican	Jason T. Smith	817	56.34	
Democratic	Steve Hodges	332	22.90	
Constitution	Doug Enyart	278	19.17	
Libertarian	Bill Slantz	23	1.59	

U.S. House of Representatives - District 8 – Wayne County (2020)
Party	Candidate	Votes	%	±%
Republican	Jason T. Smith	4,823	84.20	
Democratic	Kathy Ellis	821	14.30	
Libertarian	Tom Schmitz	85	1.50	

==== Political culture ====
United States presidential election results for Wayne County, Missouri
Year	Republican		Democratic		Third party(ies)	
Year	No.	%	No.	%	No.	%
1888	1,001	41.13%	1,428	58.67%	5	0.21%
1892	964	39.85%	1,393	57.59%	62	2.56%
1896	1,418	47.14%	1,568	52.13%	22	0.73%
1900	1,648	48.09%	1,745	50.92%	34	0.99%
1904	1,678	50.38%	1,567	47.04%	86	2.58%
1908	1,554	47.11%	1,641	49.74%	104	3.15%
1912	1,052	35.46%	1,432	48.26%	483	16.28%
1916	1,528	47.32%	1,594	49.37%	107	3.31%
1920	2,380	52.28%	2,072	45.52%	100	2.20%
1924	1,958	44.11%	2,283	51.43%	198	4.46%
1928	2,662	56.82%	2,011	42.92%	12	0.26%
1932	1,955	37.82%	3,172	61.37%	42	0.81%
1936	2,494	43.41%	3,235	56.31%	16	0.28%
1940	2,735	47.66%	2,991	52.12%	13	0.23%
1944	2,171	49.92%	2,169	49.87%	9	0.21%
1948	1,937	41.80%	2,695	58.16%	2	0.04%
1952	2,423	49.08%	2,500	50.64%	14	0.28%
1956	2,513	50.62%	2,451	49.38%	0	0.00%
1960	3,069	58.78%	2,152	41.22%	0	0.00%
1964	2,019	40.19%	3,005	59.81%	0	0.00%
1968	2,156	47.79%	1,714	38.00%	641	14.21%
1972	3,091	63.90%	1,746	36.10%	0	0.00%
1976	1,963	39.59%	2,987	60.25%	8	0.16%
1980	2,823	51.86%	2,549	46.82%	72	1.32%
1984	2,867	54.82%	2,363	45.18%	0	0.00%
1988	2,648	51.80%	2,456	48.04%	8	0.16%
1992	2,101	34.91%	3,073	51.05%	845	14.04%
1996	2,172	38.45%	2,754	48.75%	723	12.80%
2000	3,346	57.22%	2,387	40.82%	115	1.97%
2004	3,919	63.17%	2,250	36.27%	35	0.56%
2008	3,784	61.49%	2,243	36.45%	127	2.06%
2012	3,790	66.26%	1,813	31.70%	117	2.05%
2016	4,658	80.84%	948	16.45%	156	2.71%
2020	4,987	84.84%	845	14.38%	46	0.78%
2024	5,030	86.03%	783	13.39%	34	0.58%

At the presidential level, Wayne County was traditionally a fairly independent county or battleground, though in recent years the county has become strongly Republican. President Donald Trump received a record 85% of the vote in 2020, building on his former record of 81% he set, in 2016. Bill Clinton also carried the county both times in 1992 and 1996, and since that point the county has been solidly Republican to Extremely Republican. Like many rural counties in Missouri and throughout the United States in 2008, voters in Wayne County favored John McCain over Barack Obama, and favored Mitt Romney by a significantly larger margin in 2012.

In 2004, Missourians voted on a constitutional amendment to define marriage as the union between a man and a woman—it overwhelmingly passed Wayne County with 87.75 percent of the vote. The initiative passed the state with 71 percent of support from voters as Missouri became the first state to ban same-sex marriage. In 2006, Missourians voted on a constitutional amendment to fund and legalize embryonic stem cell research in the state—it failed in Wayne County with 55.15 percent voting against the measure. The initiative narrowly passed the state with 51 percent of support from voters as Missouri became one of the first states in the nation to approve embryonic stem cell research. Despite Wayne County's longstanding tradition of supporting socially conservative platforms, voters in the county have a penchant for advancing populist causes like increasing the minimum wage. In 2006, Missourians voted on a proposition (Proposition B) to increase the minimum wage in the state to $6.50 an hour—it passed Wayne County with 77.36 percent of the vote. The proposition strongly passed every single county in Missouri with 75.94 percent voting in favor as the minimum wage was increased to $6.50 an hour in the state. During the same election, voters in five other states also strongly approved increases in the minimum wage.

=== Missouri presidential preference primary (2008) ===
In the 2008 presidential primary, voters in Wayne County from both political parties supported candidates who finished in second place in the state at large and nationally.

Former U.S. Senator Hillary Clinton (D-New York) received more votes, a total of 1,458, than any candidate from either party in Wayne County during the 2008 presidential primary. Wayne County was Clinton's second best county in Missouri; her only better result was in Dunklin County.

== Education ==
Of all adults 25 years of age and older in Wayne County, 87% possessed a high school diploma or higher while 30.3% had a bachelor's degree or higher as their highest educational attainment.

=== Public schools ===
- Clearwater R-I School District - Piedmont
  - Clearwater Elementary School (PK-04)
  - Clearwater Middle School (05-08)
  - Clearwater High School (09-12)
- Greenville R-II School District - Greenville
  - Williamsville Elementary School (PK-06) - Williamsville
  - Greenville Elementary School (PK-06)
  - Greenville Jr. High School (07-08)
  - Greenville High School (09-12)

=== Private schools ===
- Victory Baptist Academy - Piedmont - (PK-11) - Baptist
- New Hope Christian Academy - Silva - (PK-12) - Baptist

=== Public libraries ===
- Piedmont Public Library
- Greenville Community Library Greenville, Missouri

== Communities ==
=== Cities ===
- Greenville (county seat)
- Piedmont
- Williamsville

=== Village ===
- Mill Spring

=== Unincorporated communities ===
- Brunot
- Bull Run Camp
- Burbank
- Burch
- Cascade
- Clubb
- Coldwater
- Dees Town
- Gads Hill
- Gaylor
- Gravelton
- Hiram
- Ladero
- Leeper
- Lodi
- Lowndes
- McGee
- Patterson
- Shook
- Silva
- Virginia Settlement
- Wappapello

=== Ghost towns ===
- Barlow

== See also ==
- National Register of Historic Places listings in Wayne County, Missouri
