= List of Missouri high schools by athletic conferences =

The following lists Missouri high schools and the athletic conferences in which they compete. Under the current system used by the Missouri State High School Activities Association, some conference member teams may also compete in the same playoff district, while others are in districts with non-conference members. As a general rule, most conferences contain schools within their region and of similar class size, the class based on school enrollment. There are also some smaller, sport-specific conferences in Missouri, such as the Quad County and West Central for football, but the ones listed are the primary conferences for all sports.

== Black River League ==
School	Nickname	Colors	City	County	Type
Bunker	Eagles		Bunker	Reynolds	Public
Clearwater	Tigers		Piedmont	Wayne	Public
East Carter	Redbird		Ellsinore	Carter	Public
Lesterville	Bearcats		Lesterville	Reynolds	Public
South Iron	Panthers		Annapolis	Iron	Public
Southern Reynolds	Whippets		Ellington	Reynolds	Public

== Bootheel ==
School	Nickname	Colors	City	County	Type
Campbell	Camels		Campbell	Dunklin	Public
Caruthersville	Tigers		Caruthersville	Pemiscot	Public
Hayti	Indians		Hayti	Pemiscot	Public
Kennett	Indians		Kennett	Dunklin	Public
Malden	Green Wave		Malden	Dunklin	Public
New Madrid County Central	Eagles		New Madrid	New Madrid	Public
Portageville	Bulldogs		Portageville	New Madrid	Public
Senath-Hornersville	Lions		Senath	Dunklin	Public
South Pemiscot	Bulldogs		Steele	Pemiscot	Public

== Central Activities ==
School	Nickname	Colors	City	County	Type
Community	Trojans		Laddonia	Audrain	Public
Glasgow	Yellowjackets		Glasgow	Howard	Public
Madison	Panthers		Madison	Monroe	Public
New Franklin	Bulldogs		New Franklin	Howard	Public
Northeast Randolph County	Bearcats		Cairo	Randolph	Public
Pilot Grove	Tigers		Pilot Grove	Cooper	Public
Slater	Wildcats		Slater	Saline	Public
Sturgeon	Bulldogs		Sturgeon	Boone	Public

== Central State 8 ==
School	Nickname	Colors	City	County	Type
Eugene	Eagles		Eugene	Cole	Public
Fayette	Falcons		Fayette	Howard	Public
Harrisburg	Bulldogs		Harrisburg	Boone	Public
Linn	Wildcats		Linn	Osage	Public
New Bloomfield	Wildcats		New Bloomfield	Callaway	Public
Russellville	Indians		Russellville	Cole	Public
South Callaway	Bulldogs		Mokane	Callaway	Public
Tipton	Cardinals		Tipton	Moniteau	Public

== Clarence Cannon ==
School	Nickname	Colors	City	County	Type
Centralia	Panthers		Centralia	Boone	Public
Clark County	Indians		Kahoka	Clark	Public
Highland	Cougars		Ewing	Lewis	Public
Macon	Tigers		Macon	Macon	Public
Monroe City	Panthers		Monroe City	Monroe	Public
Palmyra	Panthers		Palmyra	Marion	Public
South Shelby	Cardinals		Shelbina	Shelby	Public

== Crossroads ==
The Kansas members of the conference withdrew to form a new league within the Kansas State High School Activities Association.

School	Nickname	Colors	City	County	Type
Barstow	Knights		Kansas City	Jackson	Private
Pembroke Hill	Raiders		Kansas City	Jackson	Private
St. Michael	Guardians		Lee's Summit	Jackson	Private
Summit Christian Academy	Eagles		Lee's Summit	Jackson	Private
University Academy	Gryphons		Kansas City	Jackson	Charter
Van Horn	Falcons		Independence	Jackson	Public

== Four Rivers ==
School	Nickname	Colors	City	County	Type
Hermann	Bearcats		Hermann	Gasconade	Public
New Haven	Shamrocks		New Haven	Franklin	Public
Owensville	Dutchmen/Dutchgirls		Owensville	Gasconade	Public
Pacific	Indians		Pacific	Franklin	Public
St. Clair	Bulldogs		St. Clair	Franklin	Public
St. James	Tigers		St. James	Phelps	Public
Sullivan	Eagles		Sullivan	Franklin	Public
Union	Wildcats		Union	Franklin	Public

== Golden Valley Vernon ==
School	Nickname	Colors	City	County	Type
Ballard	Bulldogs		Butler	Bates	Public
Bronaugh	Wildcats		Bronaugh	Vernon	Public
Chilhowee	Indians		Chilhowee	Johnson	Public
Hume	Hornets		Hume	Bates	Public
Miami	Eagles		Amoret	Bates	Public
Montrose	Blue Jays		Montrose	Henry	Public
Northeast Vernon County	Knights		Walker	Vernon	Public
Sheldon	Panthers		Sheldon	Vernon	Public

== Great Plains ==
School	Nickname	Colors	City	County	Type
Alta Vista	Aztecs		Kansas City	Jackson	Charter
Christ Preparatory Academy	Patriots		Kansas City, KS	Wyandotte (KS)	Private
Cristo Rey	Pumas		Kansas City	Jackson	Private
Hyman Brand Hebrew Academy	Rams		Overland Park, KS	Johnson (KS)	Private
Independence Home School	Lions		Lawrence, KS	Douglas (KS)	Private
Kansas School for the Deaf	Jackrabbits		Olathe, KS	Johnson (KS)	Private
Midland Adventist Academy	Mustangs		Shawnee Mission, KS	Johnson (KS)	Private
Olathe Christian School	Warriors		Olathe, KS	Johnson (KS)	Private
Ozanam	Eagles		Kansas City	Jackson	Private

== Harrison-Daviess-Caldwell (HDC) ==
School	Nickname	Colors	City	County	Type
Braymer	Bobcats		Braymer	Caldwell	Public
Cainsville	Redmen		Cainsville	Harrison	Public
Gilman City	Hawks		Gilman City	Harrison	Public
Grundy County	Panthers		Galt	Grundy	Public
Mercer	Cardinals		Mercer	Mercer	Public
Newtown-Harris	Tigers		Newtown	Sullivan	Public
North Daviess	Knights		Jameson	Daviess	Public
Pattonsburg	Panthers		Pattonsburg	Daviess	Public
Polo	Panthers		Polo	Caldwell	Public
Ridgeway	Owls		Ridgeway	Harrison	Public
Tri-County	Mustangs		Jamesport	Daviess	Public
Winston	Redbirds		Winston	Daviess	Public

== Highway 275 ==
School	Nickname	Colors	City	County	Type
Craig	Hornets		Craig	Holt	Public
DeKalb	Tigers		De Kalb	Buchanan	Public
Fairfax	Bulldogs		Fairfax	Atchison	Public
Jefferson	Eagles		Conception Junction	Nodaway	Public
Mound City	Panthers		Mound City	Holt	Public
Nodaway-Holt	Trojans		Graham	Nodaway	Public
Northeast Nodaway	Bluejays		Ravenwood	Nodaway	Public
North Nodaway	Mustangs		Hopkins	Nodaway	Public
Osborn	Wildcats		Osborn	DeKalb	Public
Rock Port	Blue Jays		Rock Port	Atchison	Public
South Holt	Knights		Oregon	Holt	Public
South Nodaway	Longhorns		Barnard	Nodaway	Public
Stewartsville	Cardinals		Stewartsville	DeKalb	Public
Tarkio	Indians		Tarkio	Atchison	Public
Union Star	Trojans		Union Star	DeKalb	Public
West Nodaway	Rockets		Burlington Junction	Nodaway	Public

== Interstate-70 (I-70) ==
School	Nickname	Colors	City	County	Type	9–12 enrollment (2024)	Primary MSHSAA classification
Concordia	Orioles		Concordia	Lafayette	Public	191	Class 2
Crest Ridge	Cougars		Centerview	Johnson	Public	166	Class 2
Lone Jack	Mules		Lone Jack	Jackson	Public	240	Class 2
Orrick	Bearcats		Orrick	Ray	Public	121	Class 1
Santa Fe	Chiefs		Alma	Lafayette	Public	84	Class 1
St. Paul Lutheran	Saints		Concordia	Lafayette	Private	118	Class 1
Sweet Springs	Greyhounds		Sweet Springs	Saline	Public	83	Class 1
Wellington-Napoleon	Tigers		Wellington	Lafayette	Public	112	Class 1

== James River Valley Conference (JRVC) ==
School	Nickname	Colors	City	County	Type
Blue Eye	Bulldogs		Blue Eye	Stone	Public
Bradleyville	Eagles		Bradleyville	Taney	Public
Chadwick	Cardinals		Chadwick	Christian	Public
Everton	Tigers		Everton	Dade	Public
Galena	Bears		Galena	Stone	Public
Hurley	Tigers		Hurley	Stone	Public
Niangua	Cardinals		Niangua	Webster	Public
School of the Ozarks	Patriots		Point Lookout	Taney	Private

== Jefferson County Activities Association (JCAA) ==
School	Nickname	Colors	City	County	Type	Division
Crystal City	Hornets		Crystal City	Jefferson	Public	Small Schools
DeSoto	Dragons		DeSoto	Jefferson	Public	Large Schools
Festus	Tigers		Festus	Jefferson	Public	Large Schools
Grandview	Eagles		Hillsboro	Jefferson	Public	Small Schools
Herculaneum	Blackcats		Herculaneum	Jefferson	Public	Small Schools
Hillsboro	Hawks		Hillsboro	Jefferson	Public	Large Schools
Jefferson	Blue Jays		Festus	Jefferson	Public	Small Schools
Perryville	Pirates		Perryville	Perry	Public	Large Schools
St. Vincent	Indians		Perryville	Perry	Private	Small Schools
Windsor	Owls		Imperial	Jefferson	Public	Large Schools

== Kaysinger ==
School	Nickname	Colors	City	County	9–12 enrollment (2024)	Primary MSHSAA classification	Type
Cole Camp	Bluebirds		Cole Camp	Benton	166	Class 2	Public
Green Ridge	Tigers		Green Ridge	Pettis	87	Class 1	Public
La Monte	Vikings		La Monte	Pettis	86	Class 1	Public
Lincoln	Cardinals		Lincoln	Benton	123	Class 1	Public
Northwest	Mustangs		Hughesville	Pettis	85	Class 1	Public
Otterville	Eagles		Otterville	Cooper	58	Class 1	Public
Sacred Heart	Gremlins		Sedalia	Pettis	72	Class 1	Private
Smithton	Tigers		Smithton	Pettis	132	Class 1	Public
Stover	Bulldogs		Stover	Morgan	185	Class 2	Public
Windsor	Greyhounds		Windsor	Henry	167	Class 2	Public

== Lewis & Clark ==
School	Nickname	Colors	City	County	Type
Knox County	Eagles		Edina	Knox	Public
North Shelby	Raiders		Shelbyville	Shelby	Public
Paris	Coyotes		Paris	Monroe	Public
Salisbury	Panthers		Salisbury	Chariton	Public
Schuyler County	Rams		Queen City	Schuyler	Public
Scotland County	Tigers		Memphis	Scotland	Public
Westran	Hornets		Huntsville	Randolph	Public

== Metro Athletic Conference (MAC) ==
The schools in the Metro Athletic Conference all seem to be members of the Missouri Christian School Athletic Association (MCSAA).

School	Nickname	Colors	City	County	Type
Chesterton Academy of St. Louis	Saints		Maryland Heights	St. Louis	Private
Community Christian Academy	Crusaders		Barnhart	Jefferson	Private
Crosspoint Christian	Cougars		Villa Ridge	Franklin	Private
Eagle Ridge Christian	Eagles		Cape Girardeau	Cape Girardeau	Private
The Fulton School at St. Albans	Eagles		St. Louis	Franklin	Private
Heritage Classical Christian Academy	Hawks		Fenton	St. Louis	Private
Liberty Christian Academy	Eagles		Wright City	Warren	Private
Rivers of Life Christian	Eagles		Granite City, IL	Madison (IL)	Private
Thomas Jefferson	Titans		Sunset Hills	St. Louis	Private

== Metro (Kansas City) Christian Athletic Association ==
Two former members, Heritage Christian Academy (Olathe, KS) and Cair Paravel Latin (Topeka, KS), are now full members of the Kansas State High School Activities Association.

School	Nickname	Colors	City	County	Type
Blue Ridge Christian School	Warriors		Raytown, MO	Jackson	Private
Cornerstone Family School	Saints		Topeka, KS	Shawnee	Private
Eagle Heights Christian Academy	Eagles		North Kansas City, MO	Jackson	Private
Faith Christian Academy	Knights		Kansas City, MO	Jackson	Private
Shawnee Mission Christian School	Mustangs		Westwood, KS	Johnson	Private
Whitefield Christian Academy	Lions		Kansas City, MO	Jackson	Private

== Metro League ==
Founded in 1928, the ABC League was a conference of independent schools in the St. Louis area. In April 2010, the six members of the all-boys ABC League (John Burroughs, Lutheran North, Lutheran South, MICDS, Principia, and Priory) voted to expand to a co-educational conference called the Metro League, beginning in the 2012–13 school year. The co-ed schools among these six (all but Priory) had previously competed in the Metro Women's Athletic Association. Westminster also joined the conference for 2012–13 school year. The all-girls Villa Duchesne had been a member of the Metro League prior to joining the Metro Women's Athletic Association, now the Girls Independent Schools League. In the 2024–25 season, Whitfield joined the Metro League.

School	Nickname	Colors	City	County	Type
John Burroughs	Bombers		Ladue	St. Louis	Private
Lutheran North	Crusaders		Jennings	St. Louis	Private
Lutheran South	Lancers		Affton	St. Louis	Private
MICDS	Rams		Ladue	St. Louis	Private
Principia	Panthers		Town and Country	St. Louis	Private
Priory	Ravens		Creve Coeur	St. Louis	Private (boys)
Westminster	Wildcats		Town and Country	St. Louis	Private
Whitfield	Warriors		Creve Coeur	St. Louis	Private

== Mid-Lakes ==
School	Nickname	Colors	City	County	Type
Buffalo	Bison		Buffalo	Dallas	Public
Clever	Blue Jays		Clever	Christian	Public
Fair Grove	Eagles		Fair Grove	Greene	Public
Forsyth	Panthers		Forsyth	Taney	Public
Hollister	Tigers		Hollister	Taney	Public
Reeds Spring	Wolves		Reeds Spring	Stone	Public
Springfield Catholic	Fighting Irish		Springfield	Greene	Private
Strafford	Indians		Strafford	Greene	Public

== Mid-State ==
School	Nickname	Colors	City	County	Type
Calhoun	Eagles		Calhoun	Henry	Public
Chilhowee	Indians		Chilhowee	Johnson	Public
Kingsville	Tigers		Kingsville	Johnson	Public
Leeton	Bulldogs		Leeton	Johnson	Public

== Mineral Area Activities Association (MAAA) ==
School	Nickname	Colors	City	County	Type	Division
Arcadia Valley	Tigers		Ironton	Iron	Public	Small Schools
Bismarck	Indians		Bismarck	St. Francois	Public	Small Schools
Central	Rebels		Park Hills	St. Francois	Public	Large Schools
Farmington	Knights		Farmington	St. Francois	Public	Large Schools
Fredericktown	Black Cats		Fredericktown	Madison	Public	Large Schools
Kingston	Cougars		Cadet	Washington	Public	Small Schools
North County	Raiders		Bonne Terre	St. Francois	Public	Large Schools
Potosi	Trojans		Potosi	Washington	Public	Large Schools
Ste. Genevieve	Dragons		Ste. Genevieve	Ste. Genevieve	Public	Large Schools
Valle Catholic	Warriors		Ste. Genevieve	Ste. Genevieve	Private	Small Schools
Valley	Vikings		Caledonia	Washington	Public	Small Schools
West County	Bulldogs		Leadwood	St. Francois	Public	Small Schools

== Mississippi Valley Conference (MVC) ==
School	Nickname	Colors	City	County	Type
Chaffee	Red Devils		Chaffee	Scott	Public
Delta	Bobcats		Delta	Cape Girardeau	Public
Eagle Ridge Christian	Eagles		Cape Girardeau	Cape Girardeau	Private
Greenville	Bears		Greenville	Wayne	Public
Leopold	Wildcats		Leopold	Bollinger	Public
Marquand-Zion	Tigers		Marquand	Madison	Public
Meadow Heights	Panthers		Patton	Bollinger	Public
Oak Ridge	Blue Jays		Oak Ridge	Cape Girardeau	Public
St. Paul Lutheran	Giants		Farmington	St. Francois	Private
Zalma	Bulldogs		Zalma	Bollinger	Public

== Missouri River Valley (MRVC) ==
=== East Division ===
Carrollton and Richmond have been conference members since its founding in 1928. Lexington joined in 1934 and Lafayette County (Higginsville) in 1937.

School	Nickname	Colors	City	County	9–12 enrollment (2024)	Primary MSHSAA classification	Type
Carrollton	Trojans		Carrollton	Carroll	191	Class 2	Public
Holden	Eagles		Holden	Johnson	292	Class 3	Public
Knob Noster	Panthers		Knob Noster	Johnson	351	Class 3	Public
Lafayette County	Huskers		Higginsville	Lafayette	218	Class 2	Public
Lexington	Minutemen		Lexington	Lafayette	238	Class 2	Public
Richmond	Spartans		Richmond	Ray	361	Class 3	Public

=== West Division ===
Grain Valley left the conference at the end of the 2017–18 school year and joined the Suburban Kansas City Conference. Warrensburg replaced Grain Valley.

Center and Clinton were added beginning in the 2020–21 school year.

Excelsior Springs departed after the 2021–22 school year and followed Grain Valley to the Suburban Kansas City Conference.

School	Nickname	Colors	City	County	9–12 enrollment (2024)	Primary MSHSAA classification	Type
Center	Yellowjackets		Kansas City	Jackson	742	Class 4	Public
Clinton	Cardinals		Clinton	Henry	477	Class 3	Public
Harrisonville	Wildcats		Harrisonville	Cass	746	Class 4	Public
Oak Grove	Panthers		Oak Grove	Jackson	564	Class 3	Public
Odessa	Bulldogs		Odessa	Lafayette	664	Class 4	Public
Pleasant Hill	Roosters & Chicks		Pleasant Hill	Cass	712	Class 4	Public
Warrensburg	Tigers		Warrensburg	Johnson	1,029	Class 4	Public

== Ozark 7 Conference ==
School	Nickname	Colors	City	County	Type
New Heights Christian Academy	Cougars		Joplin	Jasper	Private
Exeter	Tigers		Exeter	Barry	Public
Golden City	Eagles		Golden City	Barton	Public
McAuley Catholic	Warriors		Joplin	Jasper	Private
Thomas Jefferson Independent Day	Cavaliers		Joplin	Jasper	Private
Verona	Wildcats		Verona	Lawrence	Public
Wheaton	Bulldogs		Wheaton	Barry	Public

== Ozarks Foothills ==
School	Nickname	Colors	City	County	Type
Clearwater	Tigers		Piedmont	Wayne	Public
Doniphan	Dons		Doniphan	Ripley	Public
East Carter	Redbirds		Ellsinore	Carter	Public
Greenville	Bears		Greenville	Wayne	Public
Naylor	Eagles		Naylor	Ripley	Public
Neelyville	Tigers		Neelyville	Butler	Public
Puxico	Indians		Puxico	Stoddard	Public
Twin Rivers	Royals		Broseley	Butler	Public

== Ozark Highlands Conference (OHC) ==
School	Nickname	Colors	City	County	9–12 enrollment (2026)	Primary MSHSAA classification	School type
Adrian	Blackhawks		Adrian	Bates	175	Class 2	Public
Butler	Bears		Butler	Bates	286	Class 2 & 3	Public
El Dorado Springs	Bulldogs		El Dorado Springs	Cedar	321	Class 2 & 3	Public
Sherwood	Marksmen		Creighton	Cass	266	Class 2 & 3	Public
Versailles	Tigers		Versailles	Morgan	285	Class 2 & 3	Public
Warsaw	Wildcats		Warsaw	Benton	290	Class 2 & 3	Public

== Ozark Mountain Conference (OMC) ==
School	Nickname	Colors	City	County	Type
Branson	Pirates		Branson	Taney	Public
Bolivar	(Lady) Liberators		Bolivar	Polk	Public
Carl Junction	Bulldogs		Carl Junction	Jasper	Public
Hillcrest	Hornets		Springfield	Greene	Public
Marshfield	Blue Jays/Lady Jays		Marshfield	Webster	Public
Logan-Rogersville	Wildcats		Rogersville	Greene & Webster	Public
West Plains	Zizzers		West Plains	Howell	Public

== Polk County League ==
School	Nickname	Colors	City	County	Type
Dadeville	Bearcats		Dadeville	Dade	Public
Fair Play	Hornets		Fair Play	Polk	Public
Halfway	Cardinals		Halfway	Polk	Public
Hermitage	Hornets		Hermitage	Hickory	Public
Humansville	Tigers		Humansville	Polk	Public
Macks Creek	Pirates		Macks Creek	Camden	Public
Walnut Grove	Tigers		Walnut Grove	Greene	Public
Weaubleau	Tigers		Weaubleau	Hickory	Public
Wheatland	Mules		Wheatland	Hickory	Public

== Public High League (PHL) ==
St. Louis Public Schools only

== Quad County Conference ==
Football only conference

School	Nickname	Colors	City	County	Type
Bayless w/Hancock	Bronchos		Saint Louis	Saint Louis	Public
Cuba	Wildcats		Cuba	Crawford	Public
Grandview	Eagles		Hillsboro	Jefferson	Public
Herculaneum	Blackcats		Herculaneum	Jefferson	Public
Jefferson	Blue Jays		Festus	Jefferson	Public
Perryville	Pirates		Perryville	Perry	Public
St. Vincent	Indians		Perryville	Perry	Private

== Scott-Mississippi ==
School	Nickname	Colors	City	County	Type
Chaffee	Red Devils		Chaffee	Scott	Public
Delta	Bobcats		Delta	Cape Girardeau	Public
East Prairie	Eagles		East Prairie	Mississippi	Public
Oak Ridge	Bluejays		Oak Ridge	Cape Girardeau	Public
Oran	Eagles		Oran	Scott	Public
Scott City	Rams		Scott City	Scott	Public
Scott County Central	Braves		Sikeston	Scott	Public
Thomas W. Kelly	Hawks		Benton	Scott	Public

== Show-Me Central ==
School	Nickname	Colors	City	County	9–12 enrollment (2024)	Primary MSHSAA classification	Type
Bunceton	Dragons		Bunceton	Cooper	27	Class 1	Public
Calvary Lutheran	Lions		Jefferson City	Cole	98	Class 1	Private
Chamois	Pirates		Chamois	Osage	40	Class 1	Public
Jamestown	Eagles		Jamestown	Moniteau	72	Class 1	Public
Prairie Home	Panthers		Prairie Home	Cooper	50	Class 1	Public
St. Elizabeth	Hornets		St. Elizabeth	Miller	77	Class 1	Public
Tuscumbia	Lions		Tuscumbia	Miller	52	Class 1	Public
Vienna	Eagles		Vienna	Maries	167	Class 2	Public

== South Central Association ==
School	Nickname	Colors	City	County	Type
Ava	Bears		Ava	Douglas	Public
Cabool	Bulldogs		Cabool	Texas	Public
Houston	Tigers		Houston	Texas	Public
Liberty	Eagles		Mountain View	Howell	Public
Mountain Grove	Panthers		Mountain Grove	Wright	Public
Salem	Tigers		Salem	Dent	Public
Thayer	Bobcats		Thayer	Oregon	Public
Willow Springs	Bears		Willow Springs	Howell	Public

== South Central Activities Association ==
School	Nickname	Colors	City	County	Type
Bayless	Broncos		Affton	St. Louis	Public
Brentwood	Eagles		Brentwood	St. Louis	Public
Crossroads	Current		St. Louis	St. Louis City	Private
Hancock	Tigers		St. Louis	St. Louis	Public
Maplewood Richmond Heights	Blue Devils		Maplewood	St. Louis	Public
Valley Park	Hawks		Valley Park	St. Louis	Public

== Southeast Missouri Conference (SEMOC) ==
=== Boys' & girls' basketball only ===
School	Nickname	Colors	City	County	9–12 enrollment (2024)	MSHSAA Basketball classification	Type
Cape Central	Tigers		Cape Girardeau	Cape Girardeau	1,297	Class 5	Public
Charleston	Blue Jays		Charleston	Mississippi	136	Class 2	Public
Dexter	Bearcats		Dexter	Stoddard	582	Class 4	Public
Jackson	Indians		Jackson	Cape Girardeau	1,765	Class 6	Public
Kennett	Indians		Kennett	Dunklin	519	Class 4	Public
New Madrid County Central	Eagles		New Madrid	New Madrid	363	Class 3	Public
Notre Dame	Bulldogs		Cape Girardeau	Cape Girardeau	317	Class 4 (due to private school championship rule)	Private
Poplar Bluff	Mules		Poplar Bluff	Butler	1,456	Class 5	Public
Sikeston	Bulldogs		Sikeston	Scott	984	Class 5	Public

=== Girls' volleyball ===
School	Nickname	Colors	City	County	9–12 enrollment (2024)	MSHSAA Volleyball classification	Type	Division
Cape Central	Tigers		Cape Girardeau	Cape Girardeau	1,297	Class 4	Public	North
Charleston	Blue Jays		Charleston	Mississippi	136	Class 2	Public	South
Dexter	Bearcats		Dexter	Stoddard	582	Class 3	Public	North
Jackson	Indians		Jackson	Cape Girardeau	1,765	Class 5	Public	North
Kennett	Indians		Kennett	Dunklin	519	Class 3	Public	South
New Madrid County Central	Eagles		New Madrid	New Madrid	363	Class 3	Public	South
Notre Dame	Bulldogs		Cape Girardeau	Cape Girardeau	317	Class 4 (due to private school championship rule)	Private	North
Oran	Eagles		Oran	Scott	88	Class 1	Public	South
Poplar Bluff	Mules		Poplar Bluff	Butler	1,456	Class 4	Public	North
Portageville	Bulldogs		Portageville	New Madrid	156	Class 2	Public	South
Saxony Lutheran	Crusaders		Fruitland	Cape Girardeau	175	Class 3 (due to private school championship rule)	Private	North
Scott City	Rams		Scott City	Scott	259	Class 2	Public	South
Sikeston	Bulldogs		Sikeston	Scott	984	Class 4	Public	North

== Southwest Conference ==
School	Nickname	Colors	City	County	9–12 enrollment (2024)	Primary MSHSAA classification	Type
Ash Grove	Pirates		Ash Grove	Greene	329	Class 3	Public
Diamond	Wildcats		Diamond	Newton	248	Class 3	Public
Lockwood	Tigers		Lockwood	Dade	97	Class 1	Public
Marionville	Comets		Marionville	Lawrence	207	Class 2	Public
Miller	Cardinals		Miller	Lawrence	288	Class 3	Public
Pierce City	Eagles		Pierce City	Lawrence	202	Class 2	Public
Sarcoxie	Bears		Sarcoxie	Jasper	233	Class 2	Public
Skyline	Tigers		Urbana	Hickory	215	Class 2	Public
Stockton	Tigers		Stockton	Cedar	285	Class 3	Public

== Stoddard County Activities Association (SCAA) ==
School	Nickname	Colors	City	County	9–12 enrollment (2024)	Primary MSHSAA classification	Type
Advance	Hornets		Advance	Stoddard	88	Class 1	Public
Bell City	Cubs		Bell City	Stoddard	47	Class 1	Public
Bernie	Mules		Bernie	Stoddard	102	Class 1	Public
Bloomfield	Wildcats		Bloomfield	Stoddard	180	Class 2	Public
Dexter	Bearcats		Dexter	Stoddard	572	Class 4	Public
Puxico	Indians		Puxico	Stoddard	147	Class 2	Public
Richland	Rebels		Essex	Stoddard	110	Class 1	Public
Woodland	Cardinals		Marble Hill	Bollinger	273	Class 3	Public

== Tri-County–North ==
School	Nickname	Colors	City	County	9–12 enrollment (2024)	Primary MSHSAA classification	Type
Atlanta	Hornets		Atlanta	Macon	72	Class 1	Public
Bevier	Wildcats		Bevier	Macon	73	Class 1	Public
Brashear	Tigers		Brashear	Adair	51	Class 1	Public
Bucklin	Bulldogs		Bucklin	Linn	37	Class 1	Public
Green City	Gophers		Green City	Sullivan	80	Class 1	Public
La Plata	Bulldogs		La Plata	Macon	105	Class 1	Public
Linn County	Mustangs		Purdin	Linn	60	Class 1	Public
Macon County	Raiders		New Cambria	Macon	32	Class 1	Public
Meadville	Eagles		Meadville	Linn	83	Class 1	Public
Novinger	Wildcats		Novinger	Adair	84	Class 1	Public

== Tri-County–Southeast ==
School	Nickname	Colors	City	County	9–12 enrollment (2024)	Primary MSHSAA classification	Type
Clarkton	Reindeer		Clarkton	Dunklin	70	Class 1	Public
Cooter	Wildcats		Cooter	Pemiscot	71	Class 1	Public
Delta	Chargers		Deering	Pemiscot	73	Class 1	Public
Gideon	Bulldogs		Gideon	New Madrid	68	Class 1	Public
Holcomb	Hornets		Holcomb	Dunklin	141	Class 2	Public
North Pemiscot	Mustangs		Wardell	Pemiscot	66	Class 1	Public
Risco	Tigers		Risco	New Madrid	66	Class 1	Public
Southland	Rebels		Cardwell	Dunklin	50	Class 1	Public

== Independents ==
The following lists schools that are independents, meaning they do not belong to or compete in any of the athletic conferences above. However, they do compete against other schools in Missouri (and sometimes surrounding states) on a non-conference basis. Independents are included in the MSHSAA playoff system based on a district assignment separate from any athletic conference.

School	Nickname	Colors	City	County	Type
Canton	Tigers		Canton	Lewis	Public
Central VPA	Eagles		St. Louis	St. Louis City	Magnet
Climax Springs	Cougars		Climax Springs	Camden	Public
Columbia Independent School	Lions		Columbia	Boone	Private
Frederick Douglass	Bulldogs		Columbia	Boone	Public
The Fulton School	Eagles		St. Albans	Franklin	Private
Grandview Christian School	Eagles		Grandview	Jackson	Private
Greenfield	Wildcats		Greenfield	Dade	Public
Hannibal	Pirates		Hannibal	Marion	Public
Hogan Preparatory	Rams		Kansas City	Jackson	Charter
Lift for Life	Redhawks		St. Louis	St. Louis City	Charter
Logos	Lion		Olivette	St. Louis	Private
Lutie	Indians		Theodosia	Ozark	Public
Malta Bend	Tigers		Malta Bend	Saline	Public
Marion County	Mustangs		Philadelphia	Marion	Public
Missouri Military	Colonels		Mexico	Audrain	Private (boys)
Missouri School for the Deaf	Eagles		Fulton	Callaway	Private
Notre Dame de Sion	Storm		Kansas City	Jackson	Private (girls)
North Tech	Golden Eagles		Florissant	St. Louis	Public
Paseo Academy of Performing Arts	Pirates		Kansas City	Jackson	Magnet
Rockhurst	Hawklets		Kansas City	Jackson	Private (boys)
Rolla	Bulldogs		Rolla	Phelps	Public
Saxony Lutheran	Crusaders		Fruitland	Cape Girardeau	Private
St. Francis Borgia	Knights		Washington	Franklin	Private
St. Paul Lutheran	Giants		Farmington	St. Francois	Private
St. Pius X	Lancers		Crystal City	Jefferson	Private
St. Teresa's Academy	Stars		Kansas City	Jackson	Private (girls)

== Disbanded conferences ==
- Archdiocesan Athletic Association (disbanded 2022)
- North Central Missouri Conference (disbanded 2026)
- Ozark Conference (disbanded 2024)
- Platte Valley Conference (disbanded 2016)
- White River Conference (disbanded 2024)

== See also ==
- List of Missouri state high school football champions
- List of Missouri state high school baseball champions
- List of Missouri state high school boys basketball championships
- List of Missouri state high school girls basketball championships
- List of Missouri state high school girls volleyball championships
