= Apple Creek Township, Cape Girardeau County, Missouri =

Township in the US state of Missouri

Apple Creek Township
- Township
- Coordinates: 37°31′32″N 089°45′35″W
- Country: United States
- State: Missouri
- County: Cape Girardeau

Area
  - Total: 83.38 sq mi (215.96 km^{2})
  - Land: 83.34 sq mi (215.84 km^{2})
  - Water: 0.046 sq mi (0.12 km^{2}) 0.06%
- Elevation: 577 ft (176 m)

Population (2000)
  - Total: 1,960
  - Density: 24/sq mi (9.1/km^{2})
- FIPS code: 29-01450
- GNIS feature ID: 0766395

Apple Creek Township is one of ten townships in Cape Girardeau County, Missouri, USA. As of the 2000 census, its population was 1,960.

== History ==
Apple Creek Township was founded in 1872. The township takes its name from Apple Creek.

== Geography ==
Apple Creek Township covers an area of 83.38 square miles (216.0 km^{2}) and contains two incorporated settlements: Oak Ridge and Old Appleton. Known cemeteries include: African Methodist Church, Amos/Robbins, Arnsberg, Bruihl/Ludwig/Lang, Clippard 2, Day, Dickman, Drum, Erley/Dambach, Fulbright, Goshen, Hilterbrand, Hines, New Salem, Oak Ridge Baptist Church, Rumfelt/Wheeler, Shoults, Sides, Tuschhoff, Wilson, Zion Methodist.

The streams of Allie Creek, Froggy Branch, Horrell Creek, Hughes Creek, Little Apple Creek, Poor Creek, Sandy Branch, Sandy Creek and South Fork Apple Creek run through this township.
