= Byrd Township, Cape Girardeau County, Missouri =

Township in the U.S. state of Missouri

Byrd Township
- Township
- Coordinates: 37°23′28″N 089°40′02″W
- Country: United States
- State: Missouri
- County: Cape Girardeau

Area
  - Total: 62.64 sq mi (162.23 km^{2})
  - Land: 62.6 sq mi (162.2 km^{2})
  - Water: 0.015 sq mi (0.04 km^{2}) 0.02%
- Elevation: 430 ft (131 m)

Population (2000)
  - Total: 15,693
  - Density: 251/sq mi (96.8/km^{2})
- FIPS code: 29-10234
- GNIS feature ID: 0766396

Byrd Township is one of ten townships in Cape Girardeau County, Missouri, USA. As of the 2000 census, its population was 15,693.

== History ==
Byrd Township was founded in 1807 as one of the original five townships of Cape Girardeau County. The township has the name of Abraham Byrd, a county commissioner.

== Geography ==
Byrd Township covers an area of 62.64 square miles (162.2 km^{2}) and contains one incorporated settlement, Jackson (the county seat). Known cemeteries include: Bennett, Boss/Juden, Byrd, Byrd/Delph/Roberts, Criddle Family, Harris, Hersinger, Hitt 3, Horrell, Horrell Slave, Horrell Burial, Howard at Oak Ridge, Howard west of Jackson, Jackson City, Koehler, McKendree Chapel, Mogler/Cane Creek/Lester, Old Bethel, Penny, Peoples, Ramsey, Russell/Willa, Russell Heights, St. John’s United Church of Christ at Fruitland, Slinkard, Thomas/Sawyer, Wade/Walker Slave, Walker, Ware, Woodfin.

The streams of Cane Creek, Goose Creek, Helderman Creek and Horrell Creek run through this township.
