= Hughes Creek =

Hughes Creek may refer to:

- Hughes Creek (Apple Creek), a stream in Missouri
- Hughes Creek (Washington County, Missouri), a stream in Missouri
- Hughes Creek (West Virginia), a stream in West Virginia
