= Allenville, Missouri =

- Village
- Village of Allenville
- Location of Allenville, Missouri
- Coordinates: 37°13′19″N 89°45′20″W
- Country: United States
- State: Missouri
- County: Cape Girardeau
- Named for: Thomas Allen

Area
  - Total: 0.15 sq mi (0.40 km^{2})
  - Land: 0.15 sq mi (0.40 km^{2})
  - Water: 0 sq mi (0.00 km^{2})
- Elevation: 348 ft (106 m)

Population (2020)
  - Total: 95
  - Density: 614/sq mi (237.2/km^{2})
- Time zone: UTC-6 (Central (CST))
  - Summer (DST): UTC-5 (CDT)
- FIPS code: 29-00748
- GNIS feature ID: 2397938

Allenville is a village in Hubble Township in Cape Girardeau County, Missouri, United States. The population was 95 at the 2020 census. It is part of the Cape Girardeau–Jackson, MO-IL Metropolitan Statistical Area.

== History and Industry ==
Allenville was named after Tom Allen, who was the builder of the Belmont Branch Railroad and was platted in 1869 when the railroad was extended to that point. The community was also a point on the old Lone Star Trail, and cattle were driven over the trail all the way from Texas to the Allenville railroad terminal. A post office was established at Allenville in 1869, and remained in operation until 1974.

== Geography ==
Allenville is located near the Headwater Diversion Channel between Whitewater to the northwest and Delta to the southeast.

According to the United States Census Bureau, the village has a total area of 0.16 square miles (0.41 km^{2}), all land.

== Demographics ==
Historical population
| Census | Pop. | Note | %± |
|---|---|---|---|
| 1880 | 122 | | — |
| 1890 | 173 | | 41.8% |
| 1900 | 148 | | −14.5% |
| 1910 | 257 | | 73.6% |
| 1920 | 270 | | 5.1% |
| 1930 | 190 | | −29.6% |
| 1990 | 69 | | — |
| 2000 | 104 | | 50.7% |
| 2010 | 116 | | 11.5% |
| 2020 | 95 | | −18.1% |
U.S. Decennial Census 2020

=== 2010 census ===
As of the census of 2010, there were 116 people, 42 households, and 33 families living in the village. The population density was 725.0 inhabitants per square mile (279.9/km^{2}). There were 49 housing units at an average density of 306.3 per square mile (118.3/km^{2}). The racial makeup of the village was 99.14% White and 0.86% from two or more races.

There were 42 households, of which 40.5% had children under the age of 18 living with them, 64.3% were married couples living together, 9.5% had a female householder with no husband present, 4.8% had a male householder with no wife present, and 21.4% were non-families. 19.0% of all households were made up of individuals, and 4.8% had someone living alone who was 65 years of age or older. The average household size was 2.76 and the average family size was 3.09.

The median age in the village was 35.5 years. 31% of residents were under the age of 18; 3.4% were between the ages of 18 and 24; 25% were from 25 to 44; 26.7% were from 45 to 64; and 13.8% were 65 years of age or older. The gender makeup of the village was 56.9% male and 43.1% female.

=== 2000 census ===
As of the census of 2000, there were 104 people, 42 households, and 29 families living in the village. The population density was 598.2 inhabitants per square mile (231.0/km^{2}). There were 51 housing units at an average density of 293.3 per square mile (113.2/km^{2}). The racial makeup of the village was 100.00% White.

There were 42 households, out of which 23.8% had children under the age of 18 living with them, 57.1% were married couples living together, 14.3% had a female householder with no husband present, and 28.6% were non-families. 26.2% of all households were made up of individuals, and 16.7% had someone living alone who was 65 years of age or older. The average household size was 2.48 and the average family size was 2.97.

In the village, the population was spread out, with 21.2% under the age of 18, 13.5% from 18 to 24, 19.2% from 25 to 44, 27.9% from 45 to 64, and 18.3% who were 65 years of age or older. The median age was 41 years. For every 100 females, there were 96.2 males. For every 100 females age 18 and over, there were 95.2 males.

The median income for a household in the village was $19,583, and the median income for a family was $33,750. Males had a median income of $21,875 versus $12,188 for females. The per capita income for the village was $15,993. There were 14.3% of families and 21.9% of the population living below the poverty line, including 31.3% of under eighteens and 9.1% of those over 64.

== Education ==
It is in the Delta R-V School District.
