= Missouri Route 25 =

State highway in Missouri, U.S.

Route 25
- Route 25 in red business route in blue

Route information
- Maintained by MoDOT
- Length: 86 mi (138 km)
- Existed: 1922–present

Major junctions
- North end: I-55 BL / US 61 / Route 34 / Route 72 in Jackson
- Future I-57 / US 60 in Dexter; US 62 in McGuire
- South end: US 412 / Route 84 in Kennett

Location
- Country: United States
- State: Missouri

Highway system
- Missouri State Highway System; Interstate; US; State; Supplemental
| ← US 24 | → Route 27 |

Route 25 is a highway in south-eastern Missouri. Its northern terminus is at Business Interstate 55/U.S. Route 61/Route 34/Route72 in Jackson. Its southern terminus is at U.S. Route 412/Route 84 in Kennett. It is one of the major Missouri highways that traverses the Missouri Bootheel.

== Route description ==
Missouri Route 25 begins in Jackson at a junction with I-55/US 61/Route 34, located in Cape Girardeau County. The highway heads southerly, passing through the unincorporated community of Dutchtown, where it intersects Route 74 and Route A. Continuing southward, Route 25 reaches Blomeyer, where it meets Route 77 at a roundabout.

Further south, Route 25 enters Stoddard County, passing through Advance, where it intersects Route 91. The highway continues through rural farmland before reaching Dexter, where it meets US 60 at an interchange. Route 25 briefly overlaps with US 60 Bus. before diverging and heading southward toward New Madrid County.

In New Madrid County, Route 25 passes through Malden, where it intersects US 62 and Route 153. The highway continues southward, entering Dunklin County and reaching Clarkton, where it meets Route 162. Further south, Route 25 passes through Holcomb before reaching Kennett, the largest city along its route. In Kennett, the highway intersects Route E and terminates at a junction with US 412 and Route 84.

== History ==
Route 25 was one of the original 1922 state highways. Its original northern terminus was at Route 9 in Festus. In 1926, with the creation of the U.S. Highway system, Route 9 from St. Louis to Hematite became part of U.S. Route 61, which was then routed down Route 25 to Jackson, moving Route 25's northern terminus to Jackson, too.

Until February 1981, when U.S. Route 412 was designated across the southernmost section, "the Bootheel", thus supplanting Route 25 south and west of Kennett, Route 25 passed Senath and Arbyrd, taking a sharp westward turn and heading across the St. Francis River and the Arkansas border, feeding westward to join the former Arkansas Highway 25 (now U.S. 412) toward Paragould, Arkansas. The old section of Route 25 south and west of Kennett now bears Missouri supplemental route designations.

== Major intersections ==
| County | Location | mi | km | Destinations | Notes |
|---|---|---|---|---|---|
| Dunklin | Kennett | | | US 412 / Route 84 – Hayti, Rector, Southeast Missouri State University Kennett | |
| Dunklin | Kennett | | | Route E west (Ely Street) to Route 84 west | |
| Dunklin | White Oak | | | Route 153 north – Gideon | |
| Dunklin | Holcomb | | | Route 53 north – Campbell | |
| Dunklin | Clarkton | | | Route 162 east – Gideon | |
| Dunklin | McGuire | | | US 62 west – Campbell | south end of US 62 overlap |
| New Madrid | | | | US 62 east / Route 25 Bus. north – Malden, Risco | north end of US 62 overlap |
| Dunklin | Malden | | | Route 25 Bus. south – Business District | |
| Stoddard | Dexter | | | Route 114 east – Essex, Airport | |
| Stoddard | Dexter | | | US 60 Bus. west | south end of US 60 Bus. overlap |
| Stoddard | Dexter | | | US 60 – Poplar Bluff, Sikeston | interchange; north end of US 60 Bus. overlap |
| Stoddard | | | | Route 91 south – Bell City | south end of Route 91 overlap |
| Stoddard | Advance | | | Route 91 north – Marble Hill | north end of Route 91 overlap |
| Cape Girardeau | Blomeyer | | | Route 77 south / Route AB east to I-55 – Chaffee | roundabout |
| Cape Girardeau | Dutchtown | | | Route 74 east / Route A west – Whitewater, Cape Girardeau | |
| Cape Girardeau | Jackson | | | I-55 BL / US 61 / Route 34 / Route 72 west / Great River Road – Fruitland, Millersville, Cape Girardeau | |
1.000 mi = 1.609 km; 1.000 km = 0.621 mi

== Business loop ==
Route 25 Business
- Location: Malden
- Length: 3.22 mi (5.18 km)

A three mile business route of MO 25 exists in Malden.
