= Dissen =

Dissen may refer to:

- Dissen (surname), a list of people with the surname Dissen
- Dissen, Lower Saxony, a town in Germany
- Dissen, a quarter (Ortsteil) in the municipality of Dissen-Striesow, Brandenburg, Germany
- Dissen, Franklin County, Missouri, an unincorporated community in the United States
- Dissen, Cape Girardeau County, Missouri, an unincorporated community in the United States
