= Leemon, Missouri =

Unincorporated community in Missouri, U.S.

Coordinates: 37°27′51″N 89°35′18″W

Leemon is an unincorporated community in Cape Girardeau County, in the U.S. state of Missouri.

The community is on Missouri Route 177 approximately three miles east of Fruitland.

== History ==
A post office called Leemon was established in 1875, and remained in operation until 1905. The community was named after Leemon Haile, the proprietor of a local sawmill.
