= Sandy Creek (Apple Creek tributary) =

Stream in the U.S. state of Missouri

Sandy Creek is a stream in northwest Cape Girardeau County in the U.S. state of Missouri. It is a tributary of Little Apple Creek which flows into Apple Creek approximately one mile to the northeast.

The stream headwaters arise just north of Friedheim (at 37°34′42″N 89°49′14″W) and it flows southeast and east passing under Missouri Route KK twice then passing north of Arnsberg to its confluence with Little Apple Creek one-half mile west of I-55 (at 37°34′32″N 89°46′19″W).

Sandy Creek was so named due to the abundant sand along its course.

== See also ==
- List of rivers of Missouri
