= Friedheim, Missouri =

Unincorporated community in Cape Girardeau County, Missouri, United States

- unincorporated community
- Interactive map of Friedheim, Missouri
- Coordinates: 37°34′12″N 89°49′12″W
- Country: United States
- State: Missouri
- County: Cape Girardeau
- Township: Apple Creek Township
- Elevation: 545 ft (166 m)

Friedheim is an unincorporated community in Apple Creek Township in northwestern Cape Girardeau County, Missouri, United States.

== History ==
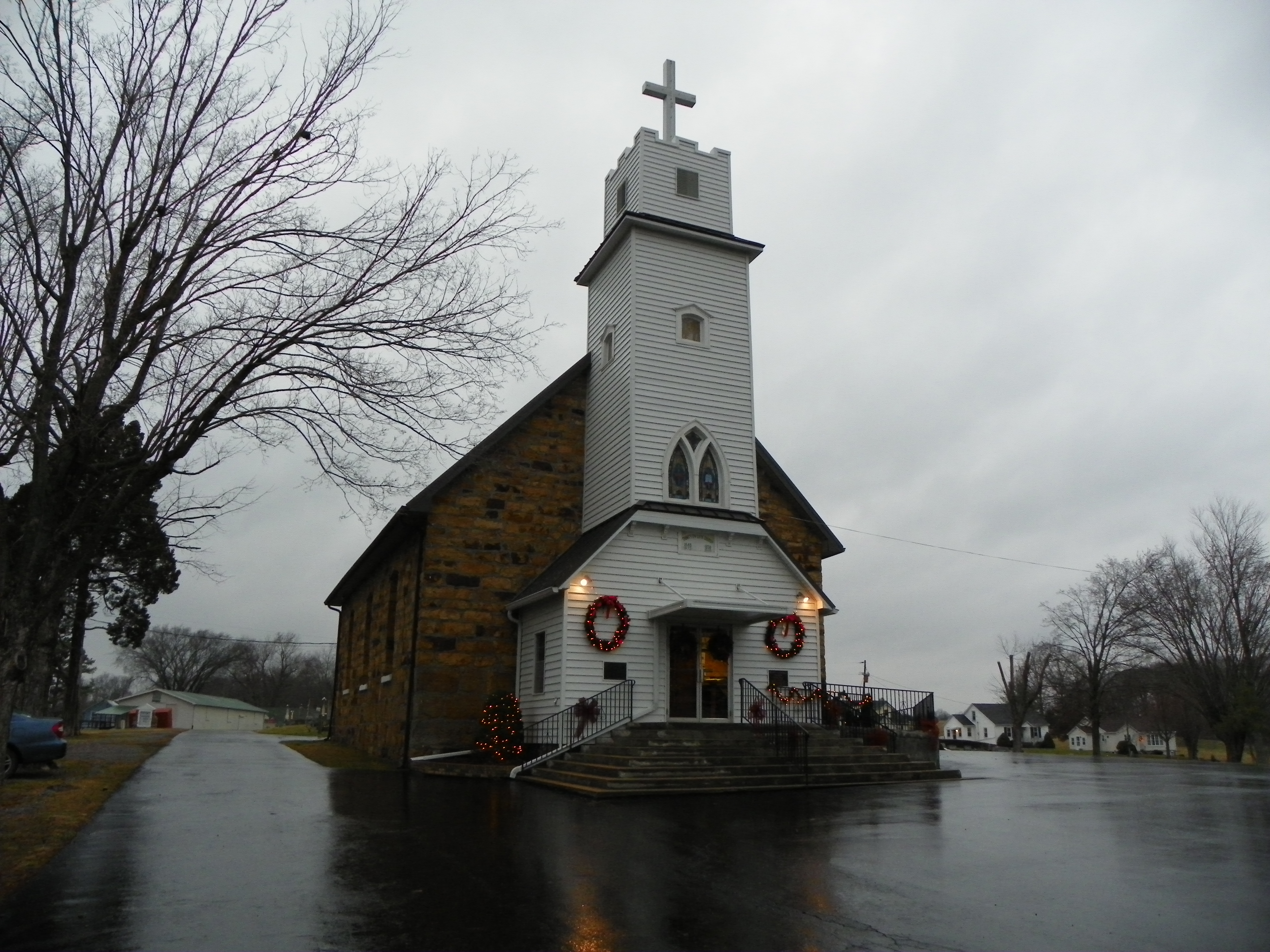
Trinity Lutheran Church in Friedheim, December, 2013

A small village in the northwest part of Apple Creek Township; German settlers arrived in the Friedheim area in the 1840s fleeing political unrest back home. These German Lutheran settlers built their own log church in 1849, which was later replaced by the current stone church in 1857. A post office was established here in 1887 and named by the German settlers for their old home Friedheim, Germany. Friedheim is home to Trinity Lutheran church, a member of the Lutheran Church - Missouri Synod.

== Geography ==
Friedheim is located twenty-two miles northwest of Cape Girardeau and is three miles west of I-55 along Missouri Route KK. Arnsberg is two miles to the east and Hilderbrand is approximately one mile to the west along route KK.
