= Arbor, Missouri =

Unincorporated community in Missouri, U.S.

Coordinates: 37°09′33″N 89°48′08″W

Arbor is an unincorporated community in Cape Girardeau County, in the U.S. state of Missouri. It is located between Delta, Missouri and Advance, Missouri on Missouri Highway 25.

== History ==
A post office called Arbor was established in 1884, and remained in operation until 1928. The community most likely was named for a brush arbor near the original town site.

In 1925, Arbor had 83 inhabitants.
