= Arbor =

Arbor(s) or Arbour(s) may refer to:

== Arts and entertainment ==
- Arbor (installation), a 2013 public artwork in Indianapolis, Indiana, US
- Arbor, a counterweight-carrying device found in theater fly systems
- The Arbor, a 1980 play by Andrea Dunbar; also the title of a 2010 film about Dunbar
- The Arbor, a 1930 play by Hermann Ungar
- The Arbors, a 1960s pop group

== Companies ==
- Arbor Drugs, a defunct American drug store chain based in Troy, Michigan
- Arbor Networks, an American software company
- Arbors Records, an American jazz record label

== Horticulture ==
- Arbor (garden), a structure of trees, shrubs or vines forming a shaded space; pergola
- Grove (nature), a small group of trees

== Places ==
- Arbor, Missouri, US
- Arbor, Nebraska, US
- Arbor, Texas, or Arbor Grove, US

== Other uses ==
- Arbor (tool) or mandrel
- Arbour (surname)
- Arbor, the central post of a fishing reel to which fishing line is attached
- Arbor knot, a knot commonly used to attach fishing line to a fishing reel

== See also ==
- Arbor Day, a day for planting trees
- Arbor vitae (disambiguation)
- Arboretum, a botanical garden primarily devoted to woody plants
- Arboriculture, the study of trees
