= Missouri Route 74 =

State highway in Missouri, U.S.

Route 74

Route information
- Maintained by MoDOT
- Length: 10.348 mi (16.653 km)
- Existed: 1922–present

Major junctions
- West end: Route 25 / Route A in Dutchtown
- I-55 / I-55 BL / US 61 at Cape Girardeau
- East end: IL 146 at the Illinois state line in Cape Girardeau

Location
- Country: United States
- State: Missouri
- County: Cape Girardeau

Highway system
- Missouri State Highway System; Interstate; US; State; Supplemental
← Route 73	→ Route 75

Route 74 is a highway in Cape Girardeau County, Missouri. The western terminus is at Route 25 in Dutchtown. Its eastern terminus is at the Illinois state line at the Mississippi River at Cape Girardeau. The road continues into Illinois as Illinois Route 146. No other towns are on the route.

== History ==
Route 74 is one of the original state highways. It has remained unchanged since it was created in 1922.

== Major intersections ==
The entire route is in Cape Girardeau County.

Location	mi	km	Destinations	Notes
Dutchtown	0.000	0.000	Route 25 / Route A – Gordonville, Delta, Whitewater	Roadway continues as Route A
Cape Girardeau	5.051– 5.989	8.129– 9.638	I-55 south / I-55 BL / US 61 – Sikeston	Southern end of I-55 overlap
Cape Girardeau	7.356	11.838	I-55 north – St. Louis	Northern end of I-55 overlap
Cape Girardeau	8.302	13.361	I-55 BL / US 61 (Kingshighway)	
Cape Girardeau	9.899	15.931	Route 177 north (Sprigg Street)	
Mississippi River	10.348	16.653	Bill Emerson Memorial Bridge; Missouri–Illinois state line	
Mississippi River	10.348	16.653	IL 146 east	Continuation into Illinois
1.000 mi = 1.609 km; 1.000 km = 0.621 mi: Concurrency terminus
