= Byrd Creek =

Stream in the U.S. state of Missouri

Byrd Creek is a stream in Cape Girardeau County, Missouri. The stream is a tributary of the Whitewater River.

The stream headwaters arise at 37°30′12″N 89°43′06″W just east of Oak Ridge at an elevation of approximately 585 feet. The stream flows to the south and south-southwest crossing under Missouri Route 72 between Millersville and Jackson and under Missouri Route 34 east of Burfordville. The stream reaches its confluence with the Whitewater River approximately three miles south of Burfordville. The confluence is at 37°19′56″N 89°47′35″W at an elevation of 358 feet.

Byrd Creek has the name of Amos Byrd, a pioneer citizen.

== See also ==
- List of rivers of Missouri
