= Arber =

Arber is a surname. Notable people with the surname include:

- Agnes Arber (1879–1960), British botanist and philosopher of biology
- Edward Arber (1836–1912), British academic and writer
- Edward Alexander Newell Arber, British paleobotanist
- Silvia Arber (born 1968), Swiss neurobiologist
- Werner Arber (born 1929), Swiss microbiologist and geneticist

== See also ==
- Arbour (surname)
- Großer Arber, a mountain in Bavaria
- Kleiner Arber, a mountain in Bavaria
- HD 82886 b, an exoplanet officially named Arber, orbiting Illyrian (HD 82886)
