= Missouri Route 177 =

State highway in Missouri, U.S.

Route 177
- Route 177 highlighted in red

Route information
- Maintained by MoDOT
- Length: 23.489 mi (37.802 km)

Major junctions
- South end: Route 74 in Cape Girardeau
- North end: US 61 at Fruitland

Location
- Country: United States
- State: Missouri

Highway system
- Missouri State Highway System; Interstate; US; State; Supplemental
← Route 176	→ Route 179

Route 177 is a highway in Cape Girardeau County, Missouri, USA. Its northern terminus is at U.S. Route 61 at Fruitland, Missouri; its southern terminus is at Route 34/Route 74 in Cape Girardeau.

== Major intersections ==
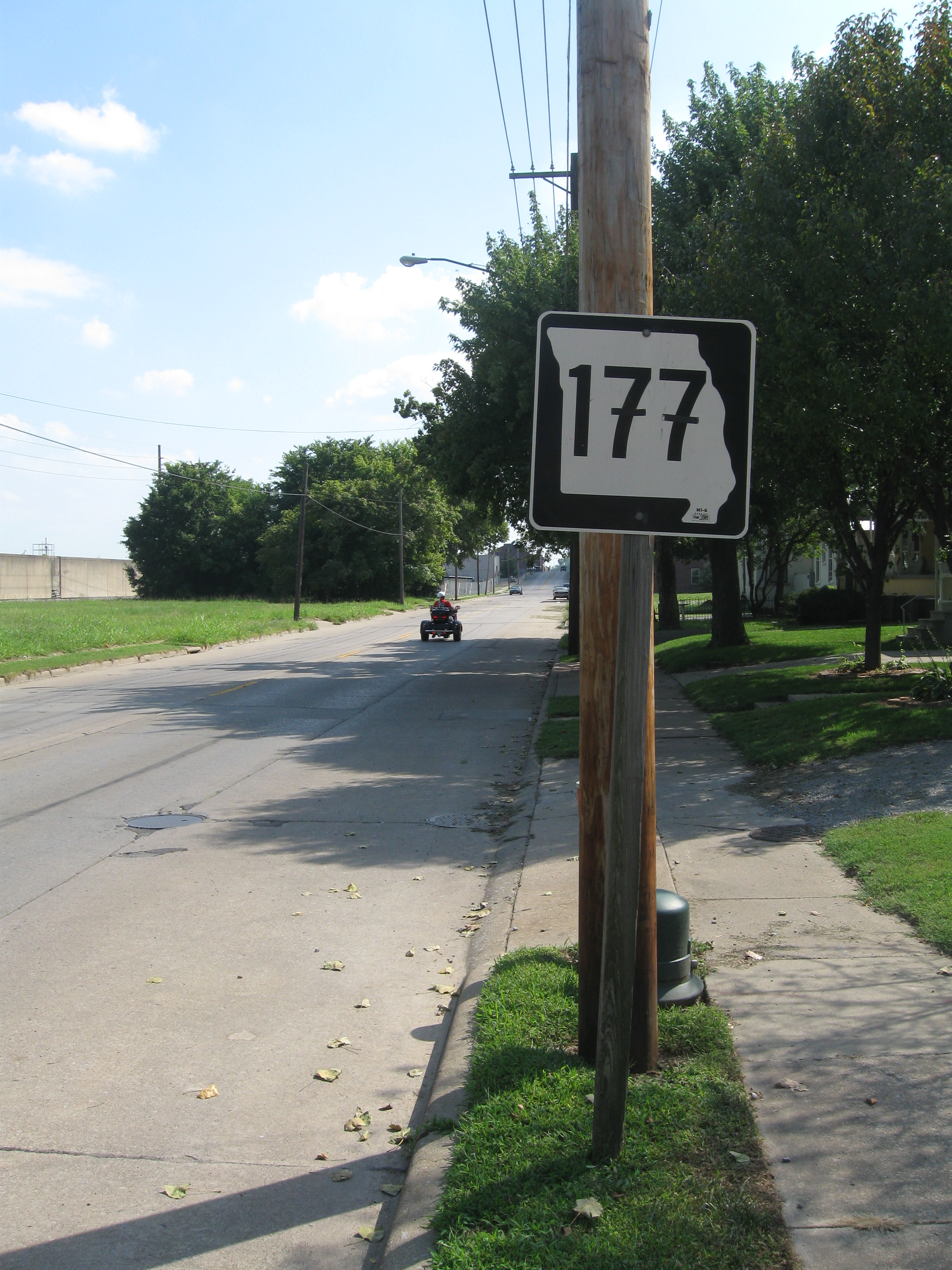
Missouri Route 177 in Cape Girardeau; Cape's flood wall is visible at the left. Note the euro-style 7s on the sign.

The entire route is in Cape Girardeau County.

Location	mi	km	Destinations	Notes
Cape Girardeau	0.000	0.000	Route 74	
Fruitland	23.489	37.802	US 61 – Jackson, Old Appleton	
1.000 mi = 1.609 km; 1.000 km = 0.621 mi
