= Tilsit (disambiguation) =

Tilsit may refer to:

- Panemunė, former part of Tilsit
- Tilsit, German name of the town of Sovetsk in Kaliningrad Oblast, Russia; in the former East Prussia
- Tilsit Éditions, a French game publisher
- Tilsit cheese, a light yellow semi-hard smear-ripened cheese
- Treaties of Tilsit, two agreements signed by Napoleon I of France in 1807 in the aftermath of his victory at Friedland
- Act of Tilsit, an act by Prussian Lithuanians signed in 1918
- Tilsit, Missouri, a community in the United States
