= Helderman Creek =

Stream in the US state of Missouri

Coordinates: 37°21′05″N 89°45′52″W

Helderman Creek is a stream in Cape Girardeau County in the U.S. state of Missouri. It is a tributary of Cane Creek.

Helderman Creek was named after the local Helderman family which emigrated from North Carolina.

== See also ==
- List of rivers of Missouri
