= Poor Creek =

Stream in Missouri, United States

Coordinates: 37°34′49″N 89°41′15″W

Poor Creek is a stream in Cape Girardeau County in the U.S. state of Missouri. It is a tributary to Hughes Creek.

Poor Creek supposedly was so named on account of the impoverished settlers along its course.

== See also ==
- List of rivers of Missouri
