= Hickory Ridge =

Hickory Ridge may refer to several places in the United States:

- Hickory Ridge, Alabama
- Hickory Ridge, Arkansas
- Hickory Ridge, Delaware
- Hickory Ridge, Illinois
- Hickory Ridge, Indiana
- Hickory Ridge, Maryland
- Hickory Ridge, Columbia, Maryland
- Hickory Ridge (Highland, Maryland), a historic slave plantation
- Hickory Ridge, Michigan
- Hickory Ridge, Missouri
- Hickory Ridge, Pennsylvania
- Hickory Ridge, Texas
- Hickory Ridge, Virginia
