= Byrd Township =

Byrd Township may refer to the following townships in the United States:

- Byrd Township, Cape Girardeau County, Missouri
- Byrd Township, Ohio
