= Hilderbrand =

Hilderbrand may refer to:

- Hilderbrand, Missouri, an unincorporated community
- Hilderbrand, West Virginia, an unincorporated community in Monongalia County
- Elin Hilderbrand, an American romance novel writer
