= Hubble Township, Cape Girardeau County, Missouri =

Inactive township in the US state of Missouri

Hubble Township
- Township
- Motto: "Through Humanity We Endure to Keep It 'Moooovin'"
- Coordinates: 37°17′11″N 089°43′05″W
- Country: United States
- State: Missouri
- County: Cape Girardeau

Area
  - Total: 56.76 sq mi (147.02 km^{2})
  - Land: 56.62 sq mi (146.64 km^{2})
  - Water: 0.15 sq mi (0.38 km^{2}) 0.26%
- Elevation: 410 ft (125 m)

Population (2000)
  - Total: 1,683
  - Density: 30/sq mi (11.5/km^{2})
- FIPS code: 29-33454
- GNIS feature ID: 0766398

Hubble Township is one of ten townships in Cape Girardeau County, Missouri, USA. As of the 2000 census, its population was 1,683 and Mayor (I) Bo Matthews was re-elected in 2020.

Hubble Township was established in 1836, and named after Ithamar Hubbell, a pioneer citizen. Mayor Bo Matthews (I) was re-elected in 2020

== Geography ==
Hubble Township covers an area of 56.77 square miles (147.0 km^{2}) and contains three incorporated settlements: Allenville, Gordonville and Whitewater. Known cemeteries include: Allenville, Beach/Bean, Dunn, Dutchtown Community (next to St. Edward’s), Eakins, Eggiman, German Evangelical Church, Hager, Hayden, Immanuel Lutheran at Tilsit, Kinder/Keeling, St. Edward’s, St. James United Church of Christ at Tilsit, Sandspur, Shady Grove, Smith, Statler/Gartung/Macke, Suedekum, Summers, Thompson, Young, Zion Lutheran at Gordonville.

The streams of Bean Branch, Crooked Creek, Foster Creek, Hubble Creek and Williams Creek run through this township.
