= Castorville, Missouri =

Extinct town in the American state of Missouri

Coordinates: 36.975°N 90.0108333°W

Castorville is an extinct town in Stoddard County, in the U.S. state of Missouri.

A variant name was "Castor". A post office called Castor was established in 1834, and closed in 1836, the post office reopened as Castorville in 1866, and was discontinued in 1869. The community took its name from the Castor River.
