= Stroderville, Missouri =

Extinct hamlet in Missouri, U.S.

Coordinates: 37.246720°N 89.813151°W

Stroderville is an extinct town in Cape Girardeau County, in the U.S. state of Missouri. The GNIS classifies it as a populated place.

A post office called Stroderville was established in 1870, and remained in operation until 1889. The community was named after William Stroder, an early settler.
