= Cane Creek (Byrd Creek tributary) =

Stream in the U.S. state of Missouri

Cane Creek is a stream in Cape Girardeau County, Missouri. It is a tributary of Byrd Creek.

The stream headwaters arise at 37°27′47″N 89°38′27″W along the west side of Fruitland. The stream flows to the southwest passing under I-55 and then Missouri Route 34 west of Jackson to its confluence with Byrd Creek 2.5 miles southeast of Burfordville at 37°21′08″N 89°45′47″W.

Cane Creek was lined with cane, hence the name.

== See also ==
- List of rivers of Missouri
