= Missouri Route 91 =

State highway in Missouri, U.S.

Route 91
- MO 91 highlighted in red

Route information
- Maintained by MoDOT
- Length: 28.765 mi (46.293 km)

Major junctions
- South end: Route C in Morley
- US 61 in Morley
- North end: Route 51 north of Advance

Location
- Country: United States
- State: Missouri

Highway system
- Missouri State Highway System; Interstate; US; State; Supplemental
← Route 90	→ Route 92

Route 91 is a short highway in southeastern Missouri. Its northern terminus is at Route 51 in Bollinger County; its southern terminus is at U.S. Route 61 in Morley. The last 22 miles (35 km) southbound run east, not south.

== Major intersections ==
County	Location	mi	km	Destinations	Notes
Scott	Morley	0.000	0.000	Route C (Harding Street) / Stephenson Street	Eastern terminus
Scott	Morley	0.663	1.067	US 61 north – Benton	Eastern end of US 61 overlap
Scott	Morley	1.194	1.922	US 61 south – Sikeston	Western end of US 61 overlap
Scott		6.578	10.586	Route CC north	
Stoddard		9.891	15.918	Route P south	
Stoddard		10.843	17.450	Route P north – Painton	
Stoddard	Bell City	12.259	19.729	Route N south	
Stoddard		17.420	28.035	Route 25 south – Bloomfield	Southern end of Route 25 overlap
Stoddard		20.077	32.311	Route OO east	
Stoddard	Advance	22.435	36.106	Route O	
Stoddard	Advance	22.637	36.431	Route 25 north – Delta	Northern end of Route 25 overlap
Stoddard	Advance	20.077	32.311	Route C west – Arab	
Bollinger		28.102	45.226	Route T east – Glennon	
Bollinger		28.765	46.293	Route 51 – Zalma, Marble Hill	Northern terminus
1.000 mi = 1.609 km; 1.000 km = 0.621 mi: Concurrency terminus
