= Seabaugh =

Seabaugh is a surname.

== List of people with the surname ==
- Alan Seabaugh (born 1967), American politician from Louisiana
- Mitch Seabaugh (born 1960), American politician from Georgia
- Todd Seabaugh (born 1961), American former football player
- Devan Seabaugh, American politician from Georgia

== See also ==
- Miller–Seabaugh House and Dr. Seabaugh Office Building
- Seabeck, Washington
