= Gravel Hill, Missouri =

Unincorporated community in Missouri, U.S.

Coordinates: 37°21′27″N 89°50′24″W

Gravel Hill is an unincorporated community in Cape Girardeau County, in the U.S. state of Missouri.

== History ==
A post office called Gravel Hill was established in 1877, the name was changed to Gravelhill in 1894, and the post office closed in 1907. The post office was named for the gravel deposits on a hill near the original town site.
