= Kurreville, Missouri =

Unincorporated community in Missouri, U.S.

Coordinates: 37°28′31″N 89°49′17″W

Kurreville is an unincorporated community in Cape Girardeau County, in the U.S. state of Missouri.

== History ==
A post office called Kurreville was established in 1877, and remained in operation until 1913. Fred Kurre, an early postmaster, gave the community his name.
