= Miller–Seabaugh House and Dr. Seabaugh Office Building =

Historic house in Missouri, United States

- U.S. National Register of Historic Places
- Location within Missouri Location within the United States
- Location: 341 Market St., Millersville, Missouri
- Coordinates: 37°25′58″N 89°47′52″W
- Area: 2.9 acres (1.2 ha)
- Built: c. 1883, c. 1911
- Architect: Caldwell, J.F.
- NRHP reference No.: 95001494
- Added to NRHP: January 4, 1996

Miller–Seabaugh House and Dr. Seabaugh Office Building is a historic home and office building located at Millersville, Cape Girardeau County, Missouri. The house was built about 1883, and is a 1 1/2-story, irregular plan brick dwelling. It features arched windows and corbelling along the eaves. The doctor's office was moved to the property about 1911, and is a one-room frame building on a sandstone foundation.

It was listed on the National Register of Historic Places in 1996.
