= Houck, Missouri =

Unincorporated community in Missouri, U.S.

Coordinates: 37°18′03″N 89°44′55″W

Houck (Houk) is an unincorporated community located near the intersection of highway F and highway Z in Cape Girardeau County, in the U.S. state of Missouri.

== History ==
A post office called Houck was established in 1886, and remained in operation until 1906. The community most likely derives its name from Abraham and Peter Houk, owners of the site.
