= Horrell Creek =

Stream in Cape Girardeau County, Missouri, U.S.

Coordinates: 37°26′33″N 89°44′07″W

Horrell Creek is a stream in Cape Girardeau County in the U.S. state of Missouri. It is a tributary of Byrd Creek.

Horrell Creek derives its name from William Harrell, a local landowner.

== See also ==
- List of rivers of Missouri
