= Moccasin Springs, Missouri =

Unincorporated community in Missouri, U.S.

Coordinates: 37°27′06″N 89°27′30″W

Moccasin Springs is an unincorporated community in Cape Girardeau County, in the U.S. state of Missouri.

== History ==
A post office called Moccasin Springs was established in 1903, and remained in operation until 1909. The community was so named on account of water moccasins at a nearby springs.
