= Rum Branch, Missouri =

Unincorporated community in Missouri, U.S.

Coordinates: 37°09′27″N 89°51′09″W

Rum Branch is an unincorporated community in Cape Girardeau County, in the U.S. state of Missouri.

According to tradition, nearby Rum Branch creek was named for an incident when a bootlegger's rum was dumped in its waters.
