= Bainbridge, Missouri =

Unincorporated community in Missouri, U.S.

Coordinates: 37.410°N 89.437°W

Bainbridge is an unincorporated community in Cape Girardeau County, in the U.S. state of Missouri.

== History ==
A post office called Bainbridge was established in 1821, and remained in operation until 1835. The community was named after a local family who were proprietors of a ferry near the site.
