= Hines Landing, Missouri =

Unincorporated community in Missouri, U.S.

Coordinates: 37°33′28″N 89°31′35″W

Hines Landing is an unincorporated community in Cape Girardeau County, in the U.S. state of Missouri.

The community has the name of the local Hines family. Morton J. Hines was authorized to operate a ferry on the Mississippi River at this point in the 1860s.
