= Whitewater, Missouri =

- Village
- Location of Whitewater, Missouri
- Coordinates: 37°14′15″N 89°47′45″W
- Country: United States
- State: Missouri
- County: Cape Girardeau

Area
  - Total: 0.22 sq mi (0.56 km^{2})
  - Land: 0.22 sq mi (0.56 km^{2})
  - Water: 0 sq mi (0.00 km^{2})
- Elevation: 374 ft (114 m)

Population (2020)
  - Total: 88
  - Density: 411/sq mi (158.5/km^{2})
- Time zone: UTC-6 (Central (CST))
  - Summer (DST): UTC-5 (CDT)
- ZIP code: 63785
- Area code: 573
- FIPS code: 29-79612
- GNIS feature ID: 0728793

Whitewater is a village in Hubble Township in southwestern Cape Girardeau County, Missouri, United States. The population was 88 at the 2020 census. It is part of the Cape Girardeau–Jackson, MO-IL Metropolitan Statistical Area.

== History ==
Whitewater was first settled in 1866 on lands belonging to William 'Uncle Bill' DeVore and Linus Sanford. It was incorporated as a town in 1898. Whitewater was situated along the St. Louis, Iron Mountain and Southern Railway. In 1915, the town had a population of 350, with a number of stores, hotels, a school and churches. The first mayor of Whitewater was P. N. O'Brien who was born in St. Louis in 1851 and who had previously lived in Cape Girardeau as he had owned the J. S. Albert Grocer Company in Cape Girardeau and helped found Shell & Albert, the first mercantile business in Whitewater; O'Brien also served the Whitewater postmaster for nearly a quarter of a century.

== Geography ==
Whitewater is situated about five miles northwest of Delta, along the Upper Whitewater River. The town is on Missouri Route A, approximately seven miles west of Dutchtown. The Headwater Diversion Channel diverts the flow of the Whitewater River just to the south of the town.

According to the United States Census Bureau, the village has a total area of 0.21 square miles (0.54 km^{2}), all land.

== Demographics ==
Historical population
Census	Pop.	Note	%±
1880	53		—
1900	122		—
1910	250		104.9%
1920	284		13.6%
1930	223		−21.5%
1940	175		−21.5%
1950	187		6.9%
1960	169		−9.6%
1970	135		−20.1%
1980	161		19.3%
1990	103		−36.0%
2000	113		9.7%
2010	125		10.6%
2020	88		−29.6%
U.S. Decennial Census 2020

=== 2010 census ===
As of the census of 2010, 125 people, 46 households, and 35 families lived in the village. The population density was 595.2 inhabitants per square mile (229.8/km^{2}). There were 57 housing units at an average density of 271.4 per square mile (104.8/km^{2}). The racial makeup of the village was 99.20% White and 0.80% from two or more races.

There were 46 households, of which 32.6% had children under the age of 18 living with them, 56.5% were married couples living together, 13.0% had a female householder with no husband present, 6.5% had a male householder with no wife present, and 23.9% were non-families. 21.7% of all households were made up of individuals, and 13% had someone living alone who was 65 years of age or older. The average household size was 2.72 and the average family size was 3.11.

The median age in the village was 39.3 years. 28% of residents were under the age of 18; 4% were between the ages of 18 and 24; 20.8% were from 25 to 44; 25.6% were from 45 to 64; and 21.6% were 65 years of age or older. The gender makeup of the village was 40.8% male and 59.2% female.

=== 2000 census ===
As of the census of 2000, there were 113 people, 48 households, and 37 families living in the town. The population density was 564.0 inhabitants per square mile (217.8/km^{2}). There were 60 housing units at an average density of 299.5 per square mile (115.6/km^{2}). The racial makeup of the town was 100.00% White.

There were 48 households, out of which 16.7% had children under the age of 18 living with them, 64.6% were married couples living together, 10.4% had a female householder with no husband present, and 22.9% were non-families. 22.9% of all households were made up of individuals, and 12.5% had someone living alone who was 65 years of age or older. The average household size was 2.35 and the average family size was 2.76.

In the town the population was spread out, with 17.7% under the age of 18, 11.5% from 18 to 24, 21.2% from 25 to 44, 27.4% from 45 to 64, and 22.1% who were 65 years of age or older. The median age was 44 years. For every 100 females, there were 82.3 males. For every 100 females age 18 and over, there were 86.0 males.

The median income for a household in the town was $26,750, and the median income for a family was $31,000. Males had a median income of $18,594 versus $16,563 for females. The per capita income for the town was $11,533. There were 21.1% of families and 30.6% of the population living below the poverty line, including 67.9% of under eighteens and 6.9% of those over 64.
