= Little River (St. Francis River tributary) =

River in Arkansas and Missouri, U.S.

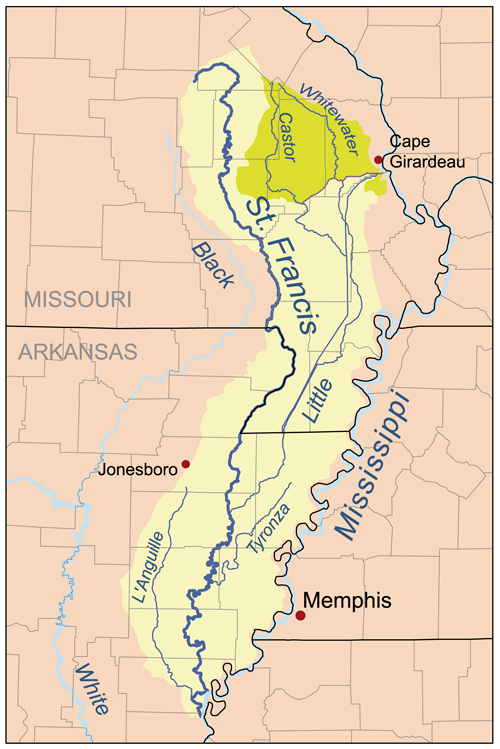
- Map of the St. Francis River watershed showing Little River. The darker shade represents the Castor/Whitewater headwaters.

Location
- Country: United States
- States: Missouri, Arkansas

Physical characteristics
- Source
  - location: Scott County, Missouri 37°02′45″N 89°45′24″W
  - elevation: 315 ft (96 m)
- Mouth
  - location: St. Francis River 35°55′26″N 90°07′51″W
  - elevation: 230 ft (70 m)
- Length: 148 mi (238 km)

The Little River is a tributary of the St. Francis River, about 148 miles (238 km) long, in southeastern Missouri and northeastern Arkansas in the United States. Via the St. Francis, it is part of the watershed of the Mississippi River.

The Little River's upper course in Missouri has been greatly altered by channelization practices. It originally collected the waters of the Castor and Whitewater rivers, but these streams' outlets have been diverted to the Mississippi River by the Headwater Diversion Channel and other drainage systems, and the Little River's course through the Missouri Bootheel has been diverted to a canal, though traces of its original course still exist. In Arkansas the river passes through the Big Lake National Wildlife Refuge and the left hand channelized chute of the river joins the St. Francis River at Marked Tree.

Little River most likely derives its name via French La Petitie Riviere on account of its small size relative to other nearby rivers.

== See also ==
- List of Arkansas rivers
- List of Missouri rivers
