= Hickory Ridge, Missouri =

Unincorporated community in Missouri, U.S.

Coordinates: 37°10′24″N 89°48′18″W

Hickory Ridge is an unincorporated community in Cape Girardeau County, in the U.S. state of Missouri.

== History ==
A post office called Hickory Ridge was established in 1856, and remained in operation until 1875. The community was named after a nearby ridge where hickory timber was abundant.
