= HD 82886 =

Star in the constellation Leo Minor

HD 82886 / Illyrian
Observation data Epoch J2000 Equinox ICRS
- Constellation: Leo Minor
- Right ascension: 09^{h} 35^{m} 45.184^{s}
- Declination: +34° 46′ 50.67″
- Apparent magnitude (V): 7.63

Characteristics
- Evolutionary stage: Subgiant
- Spectral type: G0
- B−V color index: 0.864±0.009

Astrometry
Radial velocity (R_{v})	12.73±0.16 km/s
Proper motion (μ)	RA: 16.321 mas/yr Dec.: −35.251 mas/yr
Parallax (π)	7.8954±0.0315 mas
Distance	413 ± 2 ly (126.7 ± 0.5 pc)
Absolute magnitude (M_{V})	+2.3

Details
Mass	2.53±0.46 M_{☉}
Radius	5.26±0.31 R_{☉}
Luminosity	11.9±0.1 L_{☉}
Surface gravity (log g)	3.40±0.06 cgs
Temperature	4,953±123 K
Metallicity [Fe/H]	−0.31 dex
Age	3.4±0.6 Gyr

Other designations
- Illyrian, BD+35°2026, HD 82886, HIP 47087, SAO 61587

Database references
SIMBAD	data

HD 82886, also named Illyrian, is a star with an orbiting exoplanet located in the constellation Leo Minor. It has an apparent visual magnitude of 7.63, making it too faint to be viewed with the naked eye. The distance to this system is approximately 413 light years, as measured using parallax. It is drifting further away with a heliocentric radial velocity of 12.7 km/s.

This is an aging subgiant star with a stellar classification of G0. With approximately 2.5 times the mass of the Sun, and an estimated age of 3–4 billion years, it has exhausted the supply of hydrogen at its core and expanded to more than five times the Sun's radius . The star is radiating nearly 12 times the Sun's luminosity from its photosphere at an effective temperature of 4,953 K.

HD 82886 and its planet HD 82886b were chosen as part of the 2019 NameExoWorlds campaign organised by the International Astronomical Union, which assigned each country a star and planet to name. HD 82886 was assigned to Albania. The winning proposal named the star Illyrian, after the ancient people of the Balkans region (including Albania), and the planet Arber, after the medieval term for the inhabitants of Albania.

== Planetary system ==
A super-jovian exoplanet was discovered in 2011. It has at least 1.3 times the mass of Jupiter and is orbiting the host star at an approximate distance of 1.65 AU every 705 days.

The HD 82886 planetary system
Companion (in order from star)	Mass	Semimajor axis (AU)	Orbital period (days)	Eccentricity	Inclination (°)	Radius
b (Arber)	≥1.3±0.1 M_{J}	1.65±0.06	705±34	<0.27	—	—
