= Dutchtown, Missouri =

- Census-designated place
- Location of Dutchtown, Missouri
- Coordinates: 37°15′8″N 89°39′29″W
- Country: United States
- State: Missouri
- County: Cape Girardeau

Area
  - Total: 1.78 sq mi (4.61 km^{2})
  - Land: 1.78 sq mi (4.61 km^{2})
  - Water: 0 sq mi (0.00 km^{2})
- Elevation: 354 ft (108 m)

Population (2020)
  - Total: 163
  - Density: 91.6/sq mi (35.37/km^{2})
- Time zone: UTC-6 (Central (CST))
  - Summer (DST): UTC-5 (CDT)
- ZIP code: 63745
- Area code: 573
- FIPS code: 29-20566
- GNIS feature ID: 0731565

Dutchtown is a census-designated place (CDP) and former village in Cape Girardeau County, Missouri, United States, located at the intersection of Routes 25 and 74. The population was 163 at the 2020 census. It was part of the Cape Girardeau–Jackson, MO-IL Metropolitan Statistical Area.

== History ==
Dutchtown had a long history of habitation. Martin Rodner, a Hessian soldier who came to America in 1776 to fight for the British during America's Revolutionary War, moved his family to the Dutchtown area in 1801, where he owned a water mill on Hubble Creek. Because his American neighbors had trouble pronouncing his name, it became "Rodney", and his mill was known as Rodney's Mill. He died in 1827.

In the mid-1830s, the area near Rodney's Mill began being settled by Swiss and German families; they called their settlement Spencer. That later became Dutchtown, a variation of the word "Deutsch," which means German.

The small village grew. A blacksmith and a bricklayer settled there. Bloomfield Road ran through the town, as did railroad tracks.

In 1799, the first Protestant sermon and baptism immersion west of the Mississippi River was performed in Randol Creek near modern-day Dutchtown.

In 1836 the German Evangelical Church was founded and remained an active congregation until about 1900. The original church was log, but a brick edifice was built in 1887. The church remains, as does its cemetery with about 150 markers.

The church was also referred to as the "Swamp Church," since the village was built on the edge of a swamp.

Dutchtown was incorporated in February 1998 following a petition created by residents, and was disincorporated on 15 March 2018, following continuous flooding problems. The constant flooding (which occurred in 1973, 1993, 1995, 1998, 2002, 2011, 2013, 2016 and 2017) caused several people to already seek federal buyouts, and all of Dutchtown's assets will be handed over to the county.

== Geography ==
Dutchtown is located at 37°15′8″N 89°39′29″W (37.252300, -89.658064).

According to the United States Census Bureau, the village has a total area of 0.52 square miles (1.35 km^{2}), all land.

== Demographics ==
Historical population
Census	Pop.	Note	%±
1880	68		—
2000	99		—
2010	94		−5.1%
2020	163		73.4%
U.S. Decennial Census 2020

=== 2010 census ===
As of the census of 2010, there were 94 people, 33 households, and 24 families living in the village. The population density was 180.8 inhabitants per square mile (69.8/km^{2}). There were 36 housing units at an average density of 69.2 per square mile (26.7/km^{2}). The racial makeup of the village was 93.62% White, 2.13% Black or African American, and 4.26% from two or more races.

There were 33 households, of which 45.5% had children under the age of 18 living with them, 54.5% were married couples living together, 15.2% had a female householder with no husband present, 3.0% had a male householder with no wife present, and 27.3% were non-families. 24.2% of all households were made up of individuals, and 15.1% had someone living alone who was 65 years of age or older. The average household size was 2.85 and the average family size was 3.38.

The median age in the village was 27.5 years. 30.9% of residents were under the age of 18; 12.6% were between the ages of 18 and 24; 23.4% were from 25 to 44; 17% were from 45 to 64; and 16% were 65 years of age or older. The gender makeup of the village was 50.0% male and 50.0% female.

=== 2000 census ===
As of the census of 2000, there were 99 people, 36 households, and 28 families living in the village. The population density was 200.1 inhabitants per square mile (77.3/km^{2}). There were 43 housing units at an average density of 86.9 per square mile (33.6/km^{2}). The racial makeup of the village was 91.92% White, 3.03% African American, 3.03% Native American, and 2.02% from two or more races.

There were 36 households, out of which 36.1% had children under the age of 18 living with them, 58.3% were married couples living together, 19.4% had a female householder with no husband present, and 22.2% were non-families. 22.2% of all households were made up of individuals, and 5.6% had someone living alone who was 65 years of age or older. The average household size was 2.75 and the average family size was 3.18.

In the village, the population was spread out, with 30.3% under the age of 18, 11.1% from 18 to 24, 28.3% from 25 to 44, 19.2% from 45 to 64, and 11.1% who were 65 years of age or older. The median age was 30 years. For every 100 females, there were 102.0 males. For every 100 females age 18 and over, there were 81.6 males.

The median income for a household in the village was $23,750, and the median income for a family was $28,750. Males had a median income of $25,000 versus $21,042 for females. The per capita income for the village was $14,033. About 18.9% of families and 15.0% of the population living below the poverty line, including 17.6% of under eighteens and none of those over 64.

== Education ==
Most of Dutchtown is in the Cape Girardeau School District, which operates Central High School. A small portion is in the Delta R-V School District.
