= Dissen (surname) =

Dissen is a surname. Notable people with the surname include:

- Georg Ludolf Dissen (1784–1837), German classical philologist
- Heinrich von Dissen (1415–1484), German Carthusian theologian and writer
