= McGuire, Missouri =

Unincorporated community in Dunklin County, Missouri

Coordinates: 36°29′53″N 89°58′14″W

McGuire is an unincorporated community in Dunklin County, in the U.S. state of Missouri.

== History ==
A post office called McGuire was established in 1905, and remained in operation until 1914. The community has the name of Fred McGuire, original owner of the site.
