= Blomeyer, Missouri =

Unincorporated community in Missouri, U.S.

Coordinates: 37°13′26″N 89°39′35″W

Blomeyer is an unincorporated community in Cape Girardeau County, in the U.S. state of Missouri.

== History ==
A post office called Blomeyer was established in 1900, and remained in operation until 1909. The community was named after E. H. Blomeyer, a pioneer citizen.
