= Dissen, Cape Girardeau County, Missouri =

Unincorporated community in Missouri, U.S.

Coordinates: 37°35′03″N 89°50′31″W

Dissen is an unincorporated community in Cape Girardeau County, in the U.S. state of Missouri.

The community was named after Dissen, in Germany, the native land of a share of the first settlers.
