= Hughes Creek (West Virginia) =

Stream in West Virginia, U.S.

Coordinates: 38°12′10″N 81°22′28″W

Hughes Creek is a stream in the U.S. state of West Virginia.

Hughes Creek most likely was named after Robert Hughes, a local pioneer who was kidnapped by Indians.

== See also ==
- List of rivers of West Virginia
