= Saxony Lutheran High School =

Private high school in Jackson, Missouri, USA

Coordinates: 37°25′32″N 89°37′58″W

Location
- 2004 Saxony Lane; Jackson, (Cape Girardeau County), Missouri 63755; United States

Information
- Type: Private, Coeducational
- Religious affiliation: Lutheran
- Denomination: Lutheran Church–Missouri Synod
- Established: 1999
- Principal: Mr. Ruark
- Grades: 9–12
- Campus type: Closed Campus
- Colors: Blue, Gold, White
- Slogan: Sharing Christ, Shaping Lives
- Mascot: Crusader
- Team name: The Crusaders
- Publication: The Crusader
- Tuition: $5,675
- Website: http://www.saxonylutheranhigh.org/

Saxony Lutheran High School is a private, Lutheran Church–Missouri Synod high school located in Jackson, Missouri, United States.

== Organization ==
The governing body of Saxony is a board of regents. This consists of two members from each participating Lutheran congregation. The board of regents appoints an executive board. Saxony Lutheran has four elementary feeder schools, and twenty-four associate Lutheran churches.

The school's facilities can accommodate 300 students, and had 226 students enrolled in the 2014–15 school year. It is a coeducational school that educates in grades 9–12.

== History ==
Saxony Lutheran High School was established in September 1999, holding classes in rented premises. The school bought a 40-acre (16 ha) parcel of land in Fruitland in January 2000, for $320,000. The current premises were opened, on that site, in the fall of 2004. In 2009, north-west and north-east wings were added to the building.

== Athletics ==
Saxony is a member of the Missouri State High School Activities Association, which they joined in summer 2002. Their first athletic event, under the Association, was held on November 26, 2002. A new gymnasium was opened in November 2004. Teams use the mascot, and compete under the title, 'Crusaders'. The athletic activities that the school offers are baseball, boys football, boys basketball, boys soccer, cheer-leading, cross country, girls basketball, girls soccer, golf, softball, swimming, track, and volleyball.
