= Tilsit, Missouri =

Unincorporated community in Missouri, U.S.

Coordinates: 37°19′49″N 89°44′31″W

Tilsit is an unincorporated community in Cape Girardeau County, in the U.S. state of Missouri.

== History ==
A post office called Tilsit was established in 1885, and remained in operation until 1906. The community took its name from Tilsit, in East Prussia.
