= Hughes Creek (Apple Creek tributary) =

Stream in Missouri, U.S.

Hughes Creek is a stream in Cape Girardeau County in the U.S. state of Missouri. It is a tributary of Apple Creek.

The stream headwaters arise just west of Oak Ridge (at 37°29′59″N 89°43′58″W) and the stream flows to the northeast passing under I-55 and U.S. Route 61 to its confluence with Apple Creek about two miles southeast of Old Appleton at 37°35′04″N 89°40′39″W.

Hughes Creek has the name of a pioneer citizen.

== See also ==
- List of rivers of Missouri
