= Castor River (Missouri) =

Stream in Missouri, U.S.

Coordinates: 37°13′02″N 89°50′10″W

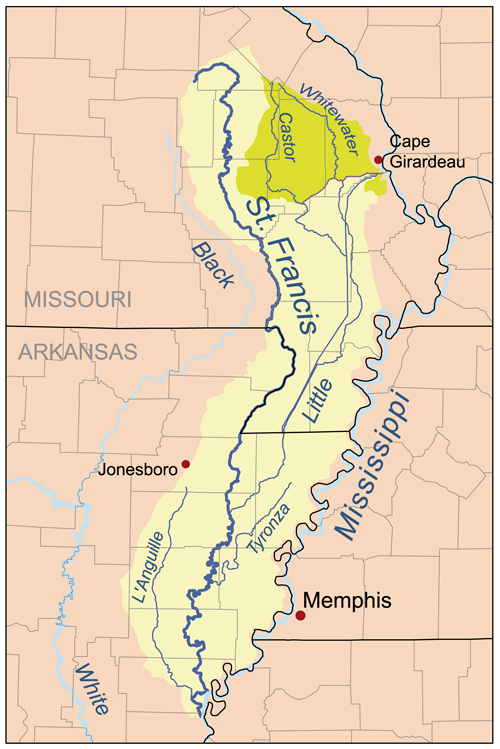
Map of the St. Francis River watershed showing Little River. The Castor/Whitewater headwaters (darker shade on the map) were historically part of the St. Francis watershed via Little River but are now diverted to the Mississippi by the Headwater Diversion Channel.

The Castor River is divided into the Upper Castor River and the Lower Castor River by the Headwater Diversion Channel.

The Upper Castor rises in the southern corner of Ste. Genevieve County of southeast Missouri about ten miles north-northeast of Fredericktown. The river flows south through eastern Madison County into the eastern edge of Wayne County to Bollinger County where it empties into the Headwater Diversion Channel, which flows into the Mississippi River just south of Cape Girardeau.

The Lower Castor River south of the Diversion Channel flows south where it joins the Little River.

Castor is a name derived from French meaning "beaver". The stream was mentioned by Henry Schoolcraft in his 1818 report on his exploration of southern Missouri.

== See also ==
- List of Missouri rivers
