= Hughes Creek (Washington County, Missouri) =

Stream in Missouri, U.S.

Hughes Creek is a stream in Washington County in the U.S. state of Missouri. It is a tributary of Wallen Creek.

The stream headwaters arise north of Missouri Route 32 about 3.5 miles west of Bismarck and it flows to the north passing between Hughes Mountain and Round Mountain to its confluence with Wallen Creek two miles south-southwest of Irondale.

The source is at 37°46′16″N 90°41′43″W and the confluence is at 37°48′07″N 90°41′49″W.

Hughes Creek has the name of the local Hughes family.

== See also ==
- List of rivers of Missouri
