= Arnsberg, Missouri =

Unincorporated community in Missouri, U.S.

Coordinates: 37°34′11″N 89°46′39″W

Arnsberg is an unincorporated community in Cape Girardeau County, Missouri, United States.

== History ==
A post office called Arnsberg was established in 1874, and remained in operation until 1917. The community is named after Arnsberg, in Germany. Arnsberg was originally built up chiefly by Germans.

In 1925, Arnsberg had 25 inhabitants.
