= Oak Ridge, Missouri =

- Village
- Oak Ridge in November 2026
- Nickname: Lizard Lick
- Location of Oak Ridge, Missouri
- Coordinates: 37°29′59″N 89°43′47″W
- Country: United States
- State: Missouri
- County: Cape Girardeau

Area
  - Total: 0.59 sq mi (1.53 km^{2})
  - Land: 0.59 sq mi (1.53 km^{2})
  - Water: 0 sq mi (0.00 km^{2})
- Elevation: 594 ft (181 m)

Population (2020)
  - Total: 237
  - Density: 400.9/sq mi (154.77/km^{2})
- Time zone: UTC-6 (Central (CST))
  - Summer (DST): UTC-5 (CDT)
- ZIP code: 63769
- Area code: 573
- FIPS code: 29-53786
- GNIS feature ID: 2396826
- Website: villageofoakridge.com

Oak Ridge is a village in the southern part of Apple Creek Township in Cape Girardeau County, Missouri, United States. The population was 237 at the 2020 census. It is part of the Cape Girardeau–Jackson, MO-IL Metropolitan Statistical Area.

== Etymology ==
As the name implies, the village is built on a high ridge, which is a drainage divide between the Apple Creek and Whitewater River watersheds, and surrounded by oak trees. The pioneers' mocking name for the settlement was Lizard Lick.

== History ==
Andrew Ramsay and Alexander Giboney settled in the area around Ramsey Creek in 1795. The community of Oak Ridge was organized in 1852 by John M. Wilson, who purchased the land at $2.50 per acre and established a store and a bar. The town was named for the natural surroundings. Oak Ridge had a population of approximately 300 in 1888. The town is home to a Methodist church and a Baptist church dating from the 1860s, and was once home to a Presbyterian church. The first high school in Southeast Missouri was established in Oak Ridge in 1874.

== Education ==
It is in the Oak Ridge R-VI School District. Oak Ridge's high school began classes on November 4, 1874, at a frame building contained four rooms. This building was used until 1923 when a brick building was built. However, this building burned during an electric storm in 1932. The Oak Ridge R-6 School District operates a small, public K-12 secondary education facility and covers much of northern Cape Girardeau County. With an average yearly enrollment of 350 students in grades K-12, it is one of the smaller public schools in Southeast Missouri. Its school colors are blue and white, and its mascot is the blue jay. Athletics at ORHS consist of boys’ basketball, girls’ basketball, girls’ volleyball, boys’ baseball, girls’ softball, cross country, and cheerleading.

For adults aged 25 and older in Oak Ridge, 66.9% possess a high school diploma as their highest educational attainment, 15.9% have less than high school and 14.7% possess a bachelor's degree or higher educational degree while 2.5% of the population possesses a post-graduate or professional degree.

== Geography ==
According to the United States Census Bureau, the village has a total area of 0.57 square miles (1.48 km^{2}), all land. The village lies approximately ten miles northeast of Jackson.

== Demographics ==
Historical population
Census	Pop.	Note	%±
1880	180		—
1890	111		−38.3%
1900	252		127.0%
1910	256		1.6%
1920	274		7.0%
1930	187		−31.8%
1940	185		−1.1%
1950	202		9.2%
1960	175		−13.4%
1970	181		3.4%
1980	252		39.2%
1990	202		−19.8%
2000	202		0.0%
2010	243		20.3%
2020	237		−2.5%
U.S. Decennial Census 2020

=== 2010 census ===
As of the census of 2010, there were 243 people, 90 households, and 63 families residing in the village. The population density was 426.3 inhabitants per square mile (164.6/km^{2}). There were 107 housing units at an average density of 187.7 per square mile (72.5/km^{2}). The racial makeup of the village was 94.24% White, 0.41% Black or African American, 2.47% Native American, and 2.88% from two or more races. Hispanic or Latino of any race were 1.23% of the population.

There were 90 households, of which 36.7% had children under the age of 18 living with them, 56.7% were married couples living together, 6.7% had a female householder with no husband present, 6.7% had a male householder with no wife present, and 30.0% were non-families. 21.1% of all households were made up of individuals, and 6.6% had someone living alone who was 65 years of age or older. The average household size was 2.70 and the average family size was 3.08.

The median age in the village was 38.2 years. 24.3% of residents were under the age of 18; 9% were between the ages of 18 and 24; 28.3% were from 25 to 44; 24.7% were from 45 to 64; and 13.6% were 65 years of age or older. The gender makeup of the village was 56.0% male and 44.0% female.

=== 2000 census ===
As of the census of 2000, there were 202 people, 82 households, and 63 families residing in the town. The population density was 549.3 inhabitants per square mile (212.1/km^{2}). There were 94 housing units at an average density of 255.6 per square mile (98.7/km^{2}). The racial makeup of the town was 98.02% White, 0.99% African American, 0.50% Native American, and 0.50% from two or more races.

There were 82 households, out of which 24.4% had children under the age of 18 living with them, 63.4% were married couples living together, 9.8% had a female householder with no husband present, and 22.0% were non-families. 18.3% of all households were made up of individuals, and 8.5% had someone living alone who was 65 years of age or older. The average household size was 2.46 and the average family size was 2.78.

In the town the population was spread out, with 20.8% under the age of 18, 5.0% from 18 to 24, 29.2% from 25 to 44, 30.2% from 45 to 64, and 14.9% who were 65 years of age or older. The median age was 39 years. For every 100 females, there were 90.6 males. For every 100 females age 18 and over, there were 81.8 males.

The median income for a household in the town was $32,188, and the median income for a family was $41,875. Males had a median income of $34,167 versus $16,635 for females. The per capita income for the town was $18,310. About 5.3% of families and 4.7% of the population were below the poverty line, including none of those under the age of 18 and 6.7% of those 65 or over.
