= Arbour (surname) =

Arbour is a surname. Notable people with the name include:

- Al Arbour (1932–2015), Canadian ice hockey player, coach, and executive
- Amos Arbour (1895–1943), Canadian ice hockey player
- Beatrice Arbour (1920–2019), All-American Girls Professional Baseball League player
- Jack Arbour (1899–1973), Canadian ice hockey defenceman
- John Arbour (born 1945), Canadian ice hockey player
- Louise Arbour (born 1947), 31st Governor General of Canada, Canadian lawyer, prosecutor and jurist
- Madeleine Arbour (1923–2024), Canadian designer, painter, and journalist
- Nicole Arbour, Canadian cheerleader and singer
- Tony Arbour (born 1945), British Conservative Party politician
- Ty Arbour (1896–1979), Canadian ice hockey player
- Victoria Arbour, Canadian evolutionary biologist and palaeontologist

== See also ==
- List of family relations in the NHL
