= Hilderbrand, Missouri =

Unincorporated community in Missouri, U.S.

Coordinates: 37°34′32″N 89°51′14″W

Hilderbrand is an unincorporated community in Cape Girardeau County, in the U.S. state of Missouri.

== History ==
A post office called Hilderbrand was established in 1905, and remained in operation until 1954. The community has the name of Dan Hilderbrand, owner of the site.
