= Headwater Diversion Channel =

Canal in the United States of America

Coordinates: 37°15′03″N 89°31′00″W

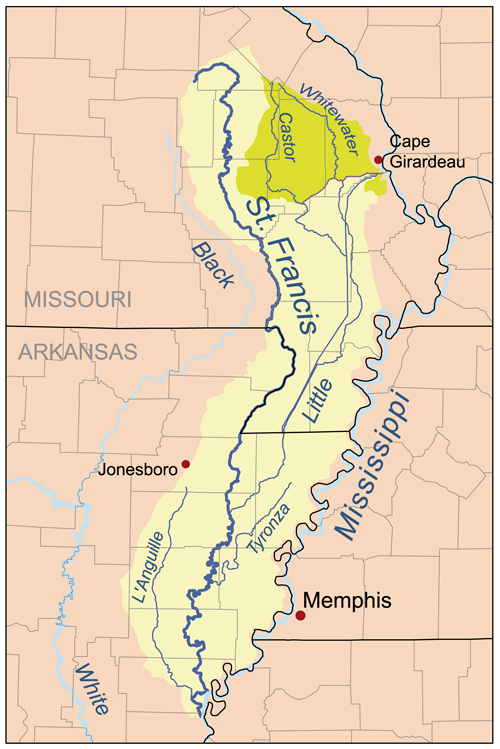
Map of the St. Francis River watershed showing Little River. The Castor/Whitewater headwaters (darker shade on the map) were historically part of the St. Francis watershed via Little River but are now diverted to the Mississippi by the Headwater Diversion Channel.

The Headwater Diversion Channel is a canal in southeast Missouri. Flowing west to east, it diverts the headwaters of the Castor and Whitewater rivers and Crooked Creek directly into the Mississippi River south of Cape Girardeau. It was built between 1910 and 1916 by the Little River Drainage District. The streams diverted by the Headwater Diversion Channel formerly flowed into the Little River. The portions that are downstream of the Diversion Channel still flow into the little river to this day.

The channel is roughly 34 miles (55 km) long and serves as a flood control structure; it is not considered navigable, although small boats such as canoes can be used on it. The Headwater Diversion Channel played an important part in the drainage of Missouri's Bootheel region, converting it into rich agricultural land.

The channel's confluence with the Mississippi River is located south of Cape Girardeau County .
