= Advance, Missouri =

- City
- Location of Advance, Missouri
- Coordinates: 37°6′14″N 89°54′43″W
- Country: United States
- State: Missouri
- County: Stoddard
- Incorporated: 1883

Government
  - Type: Mayor-Council
  - Mayor: Ryan Slinkard

Area
  - Total: 1.12 sq mi (2.90 km^{2})
  - Land: 1.12 sq mi (2.89 km^{2})
  - Water: 0 sq mi (0.00 km^{2})
- Elevation: 361 ft (110 m)

Population (2020)
  - Total: 1,349
  - Density: 1,207.5/sq mi (466.22/km^{2})
- Time zone: UTC-6 (Central (CST))
  - Summer (DST): UTC-5 (CDT)
- ZIP code: 63730
- Area code: 573
- FIPS code: 29-00262
- GNIS feature ID: 2393886

Advance (/ˈædvæns/ AD-vanss) is a town located at the intersection of State Highway 25 and State Highway 91/Route C in northern Stoddard County, Missouri, United States. The population was 1,349 at the 2020 census. Advance was founded c. 1882. The town is pronounced ADD-vance.

== History ==
Advance had its start in 1910 when the railroad was extended to that point.

== Overview ==
There is no sustained industry in the town or near surrounding area. Agriculture, although small, is the most viable local source of income.

Public services available in the city include three health/medical clinics: Advance Medical Clinic, Cross Trails Medical Center and Haven Health Care Medical. There are two parks within the city limits: Umfleet Park and the Advance Ballpark, the latter of which is where high school baseball and softball games are played as well as summer league T-ball and also has tennis courts and a sand volleyball court. The town also has one lending library: the Advance Community Library.

Advance is governed by a mayor-council form of government with Ryan Slinkard, currently serving as mayor. The city also has a police department with two full-time and two reserve officers. The Advance Volunteer Fire Department has approximately 15 firefighters with five vehicles.

There are no hospitality services or full-service medical facilities; the closest hotels and hospitals are located about 20–25 miles each direction in Dexter (south) and Cape Girardeau (northeast).

== Geography ==
According to the United States Census Bureau, the city has a total area of 1.12 square miles (2.90 km^{2}), all land.

== Climate ==
The climate in this area is characterized by relatively high temperatures and evenly distributed precipitation throughout the year. According to the Köppen Climate Classification system, Advance has a humid subtropical climate, abbreviated "Cfa" on climate maps.

Climate data for Advance, Missouri
Month	Jan	Feb	Mar	Apr	May	Jun	Jul	Aug	Sep	Oct	Nov	Dec	Year
Mean daily maximum °F (°C)	42.4 (5.8)	48.2 (9.0)	57.3 (14.1)	69.4 (20.8)	78.5 (25.8)	86.6 (30.3)	90.4 (32.4)	89.0 (31.7)	82.1 (27.8)	71.7 (22.1)	57.9 (14.4)	46.0 (7.8)	68.3 (20.2)
Mean daily minimum °F (°C)	23.5 (−4.7)	27.4 (−2.6)	35.2 (1.8)	45.8 (7.7)	54.9 (12.7)	63.2 (17.3)	67.3 (19.6)	64.5 (18.1)	56.4 (13.6)	44.5 (6.9)	35.3 (1.8)	27.4 (−2.6)	45.4 (7.4)
Average precipitation inches (mm)	3.4 (86)	3.3 (84)	4.6 (120)	4.5 (110)	5.0 (130)	3.8 (97)	3.8 (97)	3.4 (86)	3.6 (91)	3.1 (79)	4.2 (110)	3.8 (97)	46.5 (1,180)
Source: Weatherbase

== Demographics ==
Historical population
Census	Pop.	Note	%±
1900	221		—
1910	621		181.0%
1920	551		−11.3%
1930	579		5.1%
1940	614		6.0%
1950	733		19.4%
1960	692		−5.6%
1970	903		30.5%
1980	1,054		16.7%
1990	1,139		8.1%
2000	1,244		9.2%
2010	1,347		8.3%
2020	1,349		0.1%
U.S. Decennial Census

=== 2010 census ===
As of the census of 2010, there were 1,347 people, 578 households, and 356 families residing in the city. The population density was 1,202.7 inhabitants per square mile (464.4/km^{2}). There were 635 housing units at an average density of 567.0 per square mile (218.9/km^{2}). The racial makeup of the city was 98.74% White, 0.07% Black or African American, 0.30% Native American, 0.15% Asian, and 0.74% from two or more races. Hispanic or Latino of any race were 0.64% of the population.

There were 578 households, of which 28.7% had children under the age of 18 living with them, 43.8% were married couples living together, 12.1% had a female householder with no husband present, 5.7% had a male householder with no wife present, and 38.4% were non-families. 35.1% of all households were made up of individuals, and 21.7% had someone living alone who was 65 years of age or older. The average household size was 2.26 and the average family size was 2.86.

The median age in the city was 41.6 years. 21.2% of residents were under the age of 18; 9.5% were between the ages of 18 and 24; 21.8% were from 25 to 44; 22.8% were from 45 to 64; and 24.8% were 65 years of age or older. The gender makeup of the city was 46.7% male and 53.3% female.

=== 2000 census ===
As of the census of 2000, there were 1,244 people, 544 households, and 348 families residing in the city. The population density was 1,428.8 inhabitants per square mile (551.7/km^{2}). There were 593 housing units at an average density of 681.1 per square mile (263.0/km^{2}). The racial makeup of the city was 98.31% White, 0.08% African American, 0.56% Native American, 0.16% Asian, and 0.88% from two or more races. Hispanic or Latino of any race were 0.32% of the population.

There were 544 households, out of which 25.4% had children under the age of 18 living with them, 49.4% were married couples living together, 11.2% had a female householder with no husband present, and 36.0% were non-families. 34.6% of all households were made up of individuals, and 24.1% had someone living alone who was 65 years of age or older. The average household size was 2.20 and the average family size was 2.80. It was reported that in Advance, 0.2% of all households contain lesbians.

For people in the city aged 15 and over, 55.0% were married, 9.9% were divorced, 14.8% were single, never married, 19.0% were widowed, and 1.3% were separated.

In the city the population was spread out, with 19.6% under the age of 18, 8.5% from 18 to 24, 23.2% from 25 to 44, 22.2% from 45 to 64, and 26.5% who were 65 years of age or older. The median age was 44 years. For every 100 females, there were 76.2 males. For every 100 females age 18 and over, there were 69.2 males.

The median income for a household in the city was $27,734, and the median income for a family was $38,167. Males had a median income of $27,833 versus $19,702 for females. The per capita income for the city was $15,036. About 8.1% of families and 12.9% of the population were below the poverty line, including 16.6% of those under age 18 and 13.5% of those age 65 or over.

== Education ==
It is in the Advance R-IV School District.

The Advance R-4 School District runs throughout most of the northern parts of Stoddard County as well as the extreme southern portions of Bollinger County. There is a preschool, one elementary school for grades K-6 and a consolidated junior-senior high school for grades 7–12 with an average yearly enrollment of 500 students in the district. The school colors are orange and black and its mascot is the hornet. Athletics at the school consist of boys' and girls' basketball, girls' volleyball, baseball, softball (spring season), cheerleading, boys' golf, and coed cross country.

The Advance High School Lady Hornets varsity volleyball team won the Class 1 state championship during the 2018–2019 season, the school's first-ever state title in girls’ volleyball. The Lady Hornets defeated Calvary Lutheran 25–12, 25–22 to clinch the championship. The Lady Hornets went on to defend their Class 1 state title for two more consecutive seasons, defeating Santa Fe 25–11, 25–12 in 2019-2020 and topping local nemesis Lesterville 25–13, 25–15, 18–25, 25–08 in 2020–2021. The Lady Hornets were denied a bid at the state tournament for a fourpeat during the 2021–2022 season in which the Lady Hornets fell to Gideon in the Class 1 state quarterfinals. Advance rebounded and went on to reclaim their Class 1 state championship during the 2022-2023 and 2023–2024 seasons, dethroning then-Class 1 state champion Miller in a five-set thriller and then topping local rival South Iron 25–13, 25–13, 25-20 most recently to earn the school its fifth state volleyball championship. All five teams were coached by Erin Hoffman.

The Advance Hornets boys basketball team took second place at the Class 1 state tournament during the 2016–2017 season after a heartbreaking 65–62 loss to Walnut Grove.

== Notable people ==
- Bill Burlison, politician
- Dewayne Staats, broadcaster for the Tampa Bay Rays
