= Millersville, Missouri =

Unincorporated community in Missouri, U.S.

- Census-Designated Place
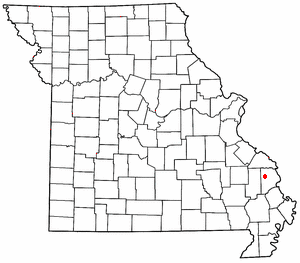
- Location of Millersville in Missouri
- Coordinates: 37°25′58″N 89°47′58″W
- Country: United States
- State: Missouri
- County: Cape Girardeau

Area
  - Total: 1.13 sq mi (2.93 km^{2})
  - Land: 1.13 sq mi (2.93 km^{2})
  - Water: 0 sq mi (0.00 km^{2})

Population (2020)
  - Total: 240
  - Density: 211.8/sq mi (81.79/km^{2})
- ZIP code: 63766
- Area code: 573
- FIPS code: 29-48350
- GNIS feature ID: 722401

Millersville is an unincorporated community in western Cape Girardeau County, Missouri, United States. It is located six miles (10 km) west of Jackson on Route 72.

Millersville is part of the Cape Girardeau–Jackson, MO-IL Metropolitan Statistical Area.

A post office called Millersville has been in operation since 1866.

== Demographics ==
Historical population
Census	Pop.	Note	%±
2020	240		—
U.S. Decennial Census

Millersville first appeared as a census designated place in the 2020 U.S. census.

== Etymology ==
The community was named after the local Miller family.

== Historic site ==
The Miller-Seabaugh House and Dr. Seabaugh Office Building was listed on the National Register of Historic Places in 1996.

== Education ==
It is in the Jackson R-2 School District, which operates Jackson High School.

== Notable person ==
- James F. Fulbright, Missouri congressman and judge who was born near Millersville, Missouri
