= Delta, Missouri =

- City
- Location of Delta, Missouri
- Coordinates: 37°11′48″N 89°44′10″W
- Country: United States
- State: Missouri
- County: Cape Girardeau

Government
  - Mayor: Jonathan J. Phillips

Area
  - Total: 0.39 sq mi (1.02 km^{2})
  - Land: 0.39 sq mi (1.02 km^{2})
  - Water: 0 sq mi (0.00 km^{2})
- Elevation: 341 ft (104 m)

Population (2020)
  - Total: 376
  - Density: 954.4/sq mi (368.51/km^{2})
- Time zone: UTC-6 (Central (CST))
  - Summer (DST): UTC-5 (CDT)
- ZIP code: 63744
- Area code: 573
- FIPS code: 29-19072
- GNIS feature ID: 0716832

Delta is a city in Cape Girardeau County, Missouri, United States. The population was 376 at the 2020 census. It is part of the Cape Girardeau–Jackson, MO-IL Metropolitan Statistical Area.

== Name ==
A post office called Delta was established in 1914. The community was named after a nearby railroad junction in the shape of the Greek letter delta.

== Geography ==
Delta is located in the flatland adjacent to the east end of Hickory Ridge and east of the Whitewater River south of the Headwater Diversion Channel. The community is served by Missouri State Route 25 and State Routes N, P and EE.

According to the United States Census Bureau, the city has a total area of 0.39 square miles (1.01 km^{2}), all land.

== Demographics ==
Historical population
Census	Pop.	Note	%±
1910	175		—
1930	306		—
1940	320		4.6%
1950	453		41.6%
1960	416		−8.2%
1970	462		11.1%
1980	524		13.4%
1990	450		−14.1%
2000	517		14.9%
2010	438		−15.3%
2020	376		−14.2%
U.S. Decennial Census 2020

=== 2010 census ===
As of the census of 2010, there were 438 people, 179 households, and 127 families living in the city. The population density was 1,123.1 inhabitants per square mile (433.6/km^{2}). There were 205 housing units at an average density of 525.6 per square mile (202.9/km^{2}). The racial makeup of the city was 96.12% White and 3.88% from two or more races. Hispanic or Latino of any race were 0.46% of the population.

There were 179 households, of which 33.0% had children under the age of 18 living with them, 49.7% were married couples living together, 15.1% had a female householder with no husband present, 6.1% had a male householder with no wife present, and 29.1% were non-families. 26.3% of all households were made up of individuals, and 12.8% had someone living alone who was 65 years of age or older. The average household size was 2.45 and the average family size was 2.90.

The median age in the city was 43.5 years. 23.7% of residents were under the age of 18; 6.5% were between the ages of 18 and 24; 21.7% were from 25 to 44; 32% were from 45 to 64; and 16.2% were 65 years of age or older. The gender makeup of the city was 48.9% male and 51.1% female.

=== 2000 census ===
As of the census of 2000, there were 517 people, 204 households, and 136 families living in the city. The population density was 1,175.0 inhabitants per square mile (453.7/km^{2}). There were 222 housing units at an average density of 504.5 per square mile (194.8/km^{2}). The racial makeup of the city was 99.23% White, 0.39% Native American, and 0.39% from two or more races. Hispanic or Latino of any race were 0.58% of the population.

There were 204 households, out of which 35.3% had children under the age of 18 living with them, 52.9% were married couples living together, 9.3% had a female householder with no husband present, and 33.3% were non-families. 29.4% of all households were made up of individuals, and 16.7% had someone living alone who was 65 years of age or older. The average household size was 2.53 and the average family size was 3.16.

In the city the population was spread out, with 25.5% under the age of 18, 9.7% from 18 to 24, 30.4% from 25 to 44, 20.1% from 45 to 64, and 14.3% who were 65 years of age or older. The median age was 36 years. For every 100 females, there were 93.6 males. For every 100 females age 18 and over, there were 83.3 males.

The median income for a household in the city was $25,417, and the median income for a family was $39,250. Males had a median income of $23,750 versus $15,938 for females. The per capita income for the city was $13,622. About 13.1% of families and 17.1% of the population were below the poverty line, including 17.2% of those under age 18 and 25.6% of those age 65 or over.

== Education ==
It is in the Delta R-V School District.

A new elementary school in Delta was scheduled to open in 1958.
