= Whitewater River (Missouri) =

Stream in the US state of Missouri

Coordinates: 37°02′45″N 89°45′24″W

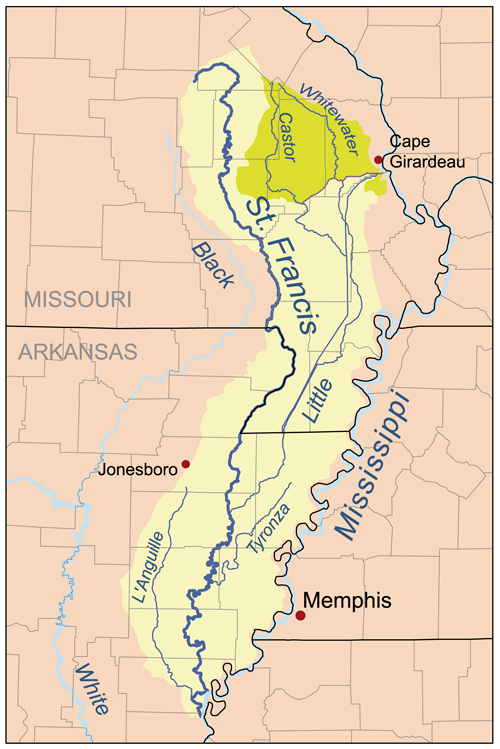
Map of the St. Francis River watershed showing Little River. The Castor/Whitewater headwaters (darker shade on the map) were historically part of the St. Francis watershed via Little River but are now diverted to the Mississippi by the Headwater Diversion Channel.

Historically, the name Whitewater River applied to a 120 km (75 mi) long stream that headed approximately two miles east of the community of Womack in St. Francois County flowing south through Perry, Bollinger, Cape Girardeau and Stoddard counties before entering the Little River near Bell City. However, in the early 20th century, the Little River Drainage District constructed the Headwater Diversion Channel, which bisected the Whitewater River, causing the northern section of the stream to be diverted into the diversion channel, and separating the southern portion from its original headwaters. In 2007, the Board on Geographic Names approved a proposal to rename the two portions Upper Whitewater Creek and Lower Whitewater Creek. With the Upper Whitewater Creek now flowing through the Headwater Diversion Channel to the Mississippi River just south of Cape Girardeau.
