= Fruitland, Missouri =

Unincorporated community in Missouri, U.S.

Fruitland
- Unincorporated community
- Location within Missouri
- Coordinates: 37.4487°N 89.6387°W
- Country: United States
- State: Missouri
- County: Cape Girardeau
- Named after: Fruit orchard

Fruitland is an unincorporated community in Cape Girardeau County, Missouri, United States. It is located on U.S. Route 61, 5 mi (8.0 km) north of Jackson and just over one mile north of the intersection of U.S. 61 and Interstate 55.

== History ==
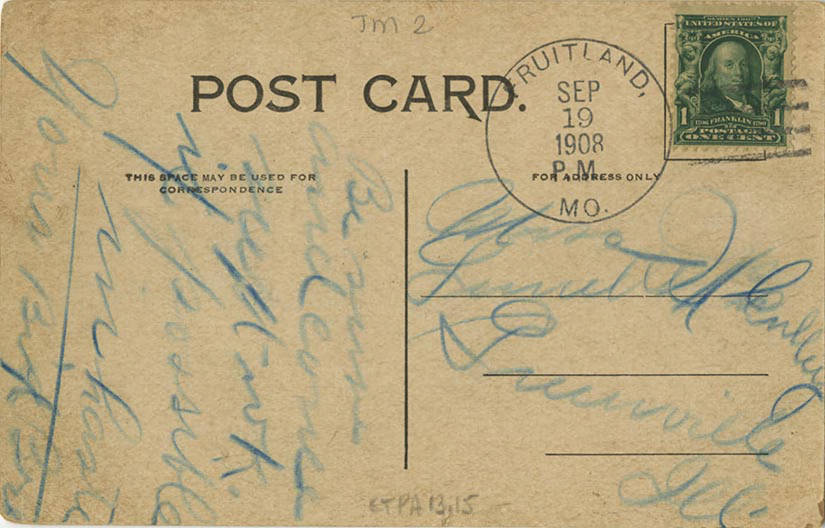
Postcard postmarked in Fruitland, MO 1908

A post office called Fruitland was established in 1886, and remained in operation until 1968. The community was named for a fruit orchard near the original town site.
