= Cape Girardeau County, Missouri =

County in Missouri, United States

- County
- Old Cape Girardeau County Courthouse in Jackson

- Location within the U.S. state of Missouri
- Coordinates: 37°23′N 89°41′W
- Country: United States
- State: Missouri
- Founded: October 1, 1812
- Named for: A rock promontory over the Mississippi River and Ensign Sieur Jean Baptiste de Girardot (also spelled Girardeau or Girardat)
- Seat: Jackson
- Largest city: Cape Girardeau

Area
  - Total: 586 sq mi (1,520 km^{2})
  - Land: 579 sq mi (1,500 km^{2})
  - Water: 7.8 sq mi (20 km^{2})

Population (2020)
  - Total: 81,710
  - Estimate (2025): 83,999 ▲
  - Density: 141/sq mi (54.5/km^{2})
- Time zone: UTC−6 (Central)
  - Summer (DST): UTC−5 (CDT)
- Congressional district: 8th
- Website: www.capecounty.us

Cape Girardeau County is located in the southeastern part of the U.S. state of Missouri; its eastern border is formed by the Mississippi River. At the 2020 census, the population was 81,710. The county seat is Jackson, the first city in the US to be named in honor of President Andrew Jackson. Officially organized on October 1, 1812, the county is named after Ensign Sieur Jean Baptiste de Girardot, an official of the French colonial years. The "cape" in the county's name is named after a former promontory rock overlooking the Mississippi River; this feature was demolished during railroad construction. Cape Girardeau County is the hub of the Cape Girardeau–Jackson metropolitan area. Its largest city is Cape Girardeau.

== History ==
Cape Girardeau County was organized on October 1, 1812, as one of five original counties in the Missouri Territory after the US made the Louisiana Purchase of 1803. It is named after Ensign Sieur Jean Baptiste de Girardot (also spelled Girardeau or Girardat), a French officer stationed 1704–1720 at Kaskaskia in the Illinois Country of New France. In 1733 he founded a trading post on the Mississippi River, which developed as the present-day city of Cape Girardeau. The "cape" in the county name was a rock promontory overlooking the Mississippi River; the original cape rock was destroyed by railroad construction.

Jackson, Missouri is the county seat. The first Cape Girardeau County Courthouse was constructed in 1818 by John Davis. This courthouse burned in 1870. The present courthouse in Jackson was completed in 1908 and was designed by P.H. Weathers.

The county is the site of one of the oldest cold cases in the state of Missouri. Bonnie Huffman, a 20-year-old schoolteacher, was found murdered in a ditch just outside Delta on July 2, 1954. Her case was never solved.

Cape Girardeau is referenced in Dave Van Ronk's song "Hang Me, Oh Hang Me," which has found a place in the folk canon since its release in 1962. The song was featured prominently in the 2013 film Inside Llewyn Davis. In the second verse, the singer refers to having "been all around Cape Girardeau and parts of Arkansas...poor boy, I've been all around this world."

== Geography ==
According to the U.S. Census Bureau, the county has a total area of 586 square miles (1,520 km^{2}), of which 579 square miles (1,500 km^{2}) is land and 7.8 square miles (20 km^{2}) (1.3%) is water.

The geography of Cape Girardeau County varies greatly. The areas around the towns of Delta and Dutchtown are flood plains, which were cultivated as cotton plantations. Western and northern areas are hilly and forested.

=== Adjacent counties ===
- Perry County (northwest)
- Union County, Illinois (northeast across the river)
- Alexander County, Illinois (east across the Mississippi River)
- Scott County (southeast)
- Stoddard County (south)
- Bollinger County (west)

=== Major highways ===
- Interstate 55
- U.S. Route 61
- Route 25
- Route 34
- Route 72
- Route 74

== Demographics ==
Historical population
Census	Pop.	Note	%±
1820	5,968		—
1830	7,445		24.7%
1840	9,359		25.7%
1850	13,912		48.6%
1860	15,547		11.8%
1870	17,558		12.9%
1880	20,998		19.6%
1890	22,060		5.1%
1900	24,315		10.2%
1910	27,621		13.6%
1920	29,839		8.0%
1930	33,203		11.3%
1940	37,775		13.8%
1950	38,397		1.6%
1960	42,020		9.4%
1970	49,350		17.4%
1980	58,837		19.2%
1990	61,633		4.8%
2000	68,693		11.5%
2010	75,674		10.2%
2020	81,710		8.0%
2025 (est.)	83,999	▲	2.8%
U.S. Decennial Census; 1790-1960 1900-1990; 1990-2000 2010-2020

=== 2020 census ===
As of the 2020 census, the county had a population of 81,710. The median age was 37.4 years. 21.3% of residents were under the age of 18 and 17.8% of residents were 65 years of age or older. For every 100 females there were 94.8 males, and for every 100 females age 18 and over there were 92.2 males age 18 and over.

The racial makeup of the county was 83.1% White, 8.0% Black or African American, 0.3% American Indian and Alaska Native, 1.6% Asian, 0.0% Native Hawaiian and Pacific Islander, 1.2% from some other race, and 5.8% from two or more races. Hispanic or Latino residents of any race comprised 2.7% of the population.

Cape Girardeau County, Missouri – Racial and ethnic composition Note: the US Census treats Hispanic/Latino as an ethnic category. This table excludes Latinos from the racial categories and assigns them to a separate category. Hispanics/Latinos may be of any race.
Race / Ethnicity (NH = Non-Hispanic)	Pop 1980	Pop 1990	Pop 2000	Pop 2010	Pop 2020	% 1980	% 1990	% 2000	% 2010	% 2020
White alone (NH)	56,014	57,761	62,926	66,532	67,393	95.20%	93.72%	91.60%	87.92%	82.48%
Black or African American alone (NH)	2,223	2,979	3,607	5,290	6,459	3.78%	4.83%	5.25%	6.99%	7.90%
Native American or Alaska Native alone (NH)	78	92	234	171	170	0.13%	0.15%	0.34%	0.23%	0.21%
Asian alone (NH)	185	467	511	887	1,300	0.31%	0.76%	0.74%	1.17%	1.59%
Native Hawaiian or Pacific Islander alone (NH)	x	x	18	19	14	x	x	0.03%	0.03%	0.02%
Other race alone (NH)	39	21	60	61	202	0.07%	0.03%	0.09%	0.08%	0.25%
Mixed race or Multiracial (NH)	x	x	713	1,238	3,938	x	x	1.04%	1.64%	4.82%
Hispanic or Latino (any race)	298	313	624	1,476	2,234	0.51%	0.51%	0.91%	1.95%	2.73%
Total	58,837	61,633	68,693	75,674	81,710	100.00%	100.00%	100.00%	100.00%	100.00%

67.8% of residents lived in urban areas, while 32.2% lived in rural areas.

There were 32,544 households in the county, of which 28.5% had children under the age of 18 living with them and 27.9% had a female householder with no spouse or partner present. About 29.8% of all households were made up of individuals and 11.3% had someone living alone who was 65 years of age or older.

There were 35,696 housing units, of which 8.8% were vacant. Among occupied housing units, 63.8% were owner-occupied and 36.2% were renter-occupied. The homeowner vacancy rate was 1.7% and the rental vacancy rate was 10.0%.

=== 2000 census ===
As of the 2000 census, there were 68,693 people, 26,980 households, and 17,941 families residing in the county. The population density was 119 inhabitants per square mile (46/km^{2}). There were 29,434 housing units at an average density of 51 units per square mile (20/km^{2}). The racial makeup of the county was 92.13% White, 5.28% Black or African American, 0.36% Native American, 0.75% Asian, 0.03% Pacific Islander, 0.31% from other races, and 1.15% from two or more races. Approximately 0.91% of the population were Hispanic or Latino of any race.

There were 26,980 households, out of which 31.20% had children under the age of 18 living with them, 53.80% were married couples living together, 9.80% had a female householder with no husband present, and 33.50% were non-families. 27.30% of all households were made up of individuals, and 10.10% had someone living alone who was 65 years of age or older. The average household size was 2.42 and the average family size was 2.96.

In the county, the population was spread out, with 23.40% under the age of 18, 13.40% from 18 to 24, 27.80% from 25 to 44, 21.60% from 45 to 64, and 13.80% who were 65 years of age or older. The median age was 35 years. For every 100 females, there were 93.20 males. For every 100 females age 18 and over, there were 90.00 males.

The median income for a household in the county was $45,862, and the median income for a family was $58,037. Males had a median income of $32,371 versus $20,833 for females. The per capita income for the county was $24,303. About 6.70% of families and 11.10% of the population were below the poverty line, including 11.40% of those under age 18 and 10.10% of those age 65 or over.

=== Religion ===
According to the Association of Religion Data Archives County Membership Report (2010), Cape Girardeau County is part of the Bible Belt, with evangelical Protestantism being the most predominant religion. The most predominant denominations among residents in Cape Girardeau County who adhere to a religion are Roman Catholics (19.19%), Assemblies of God (19.13%), and Lutherans (LCMS) (16.58%).

== Education ==
Of adults 25 years of age and older in Cape Girardeau County, 81.1% possess a high school diploma or higher while 24.2% hold a bachelor's degree as their highest educational attainment.

School districts including sections of the county, no matter how slight, even if the relevant schools and/or administration buildings in another county:

- Advance R-IV School District
- Cape Girardeau 63 School District
- Delta R-V School District
- Jackson R-II School District
- Meadow Heights R-II School District
- Oak Ridge R-VI School District
- Nell Holcomb R-IV School District (elementary only)

=== Public schools ===
- Delta R-V School District—Delta
  - Delta Elementary School (K–6)
  - Delta High School (7–12)
- Oak Ridge R-VI School District—Oak Ridge
  - Oak Ridge Elementary School (K–6)
  - Oak Ridge High School (7–12)
- Nell Holcomb R-IV School District—Egypt Mills
  - Nell Holcomb Elementary School (K–8)
- Jackson R-II School District—Jackson
  - Gordonville Attendance Center (K–3)—Gordonville
  - Millersville Attendance Center (K–3)—Millersville
  - North Elementary School (K–4)
  - Orchard Drive Elementary School (K–4)
  - South Elementary School (PK–5)
  - West Lane Elementary School (K–4)
  - East Elementary School (PK-4)
  - Jackson Middle School (5-6)
  - Russell Hawkins Jr. High School (7-9)
  - Jackson High School (9–12)
- Cape Girardeau Public Schools No. 63—Cape Girardeau
  - Alma Schrader Elementary School (K–4)
  - Blanchard Elementary School (K–4)
  - Clippard Elementary School (K–4)
  - Franklin Elementary School (K–4)
  - Jefferson Elementary School (K–4)
  - Cape Central Middle School (5–6)
  - Cape Central Jr. High School (7–8)
  - Cape Central High School (9–12)
  - Cape Girardeau Career & Technology Center (10–12)

=== Private schools ===
- Cape Christian School (K–8)—Cape Girardeau; Assembly of God/Pentecostal
- St. Mary Cathedral School (K–8)—Cape Girardeau; Roman Catholic
- St. Vincent De Paul Elementary School (K–8)—Cape Girardeau; Roman Catholic
- Trinity Lutheran School (PK–8)—Cape Girardeau; Lutheran
- Immaculate Conception School (PK–8)—Jackson; Roman Catholic
- St. Paul Lutheran School (PK–8)—Jackson; Lutheran
- Eagle Ridge Christian School (PK–12)—Cape Girardeau; Non-denominational Christian
- Notre Dame Regional High School (9–12)—Cape Girardeau; Roman Catholic
- Saxony Lutheran High School (9–12)—Jackson/Fruitland; Lutheran

=== Post-secondary education ===
- Metro Business College—Cape Girardeau (Permanently Closed)
- Southeast Missouri State University—Cape Girardeau

Since 2022, Mineral Area College's service area includes Cape Girardeau County.

=== Public libraries ===
- Cape Girardeau Public Library
- Riverside Regional Library

== Communities ==
=== Cities ===
- Cape Girardeau (small part in Scott County)
- Delta
- Jackson (county seat)
- Scott City (mostly in Scott County)

=== Villages ===
- Allenville
- Dutchtown
- Gordonville
- Oak Ridge
- Old Appleton
- Pocahontas
- Whitewater

=== Census-designated place ===
- Burfordville
- Millersville
- New Wells
- Shawneetown

=== Unincorporated communities ===
- Arbor
- Arnsberg
- Bainbridge
- Blomeyer
- Crump
- Daisy
- Dissen
- Egypt Mills
- Friedheim
- Fruitland
- Gravel Hill
- Hickory Ridge
- Hilderbrand
- Hines Landing
- Houck
- Kurreville
- Leemon
- Moccasin Springs
- Neely's Landing
- Oriole
- Randles
- Rum Branch
- Tilsit

== Notable people ==
- Jacob M. Appel, novelist
- William F. Barnes, former head football coach for UCLA
- Leon Brinkopf, former professional baseball player
- Joseph Cable, a Medal of Honor recipient during the American Indian Wars
- Shirley Crites, All-American Girls Professional Baseball League player
- Dale Dye, Actor and retired U.S. Marine
- A.J. Ellis, former Major League Baseball catcher
- John Thomson Faris, clergyman
- Gary Friedrich, writer of the comic book Ghost Rider
- Linda M. Godwin, NASA astronaut and scientist
- Chic Hecht, U.S. Senator from Nevada (1983-1989) and Ambassador to the Bahamas (1989-1993)
- Edwin C. Horrell, American football player and coach
- Andrew Conway Ivy, President of the American Physiological Society (1939–1941)
- Terry Jones, fundamentalist pastor of Dove World Outreach Center
- Peter Kinder, 46th Lieutenant Governor of Missouri (2005–2017)
- Richard Kinder, businessman and co-founder and executive chairman of Kinder Morgan, Inc.
- The Limbaugh family, including political commentators, brothers David and Rush Limbaugh
- Mark Littell, Former professional baseball pitcher
- Fred Henry McGuire, Medal of Honor recipient for his role in the Philippine–American War
- Marie Elizabeth Watkins Oliver, "the Betsy Ross of Missouri," designer and creator of the Missouri State Flag
- Stephanie O'Sullivan, Principal Deputy Director of National Intelligence
- Susan Beth Scott, 2008 and 2012 U.S. Paralympic Medalist Swimmer
- John Locke Scripps, journalist and biographer
- Tony Spinner, guitarist and singer
- Jess Stacy, jazz pianist
- William S. Stone, former Superintendent of the U.S. Air Force Academy
- Billy Swan, singer of #1 hit song "I Can Help" in 1974
- Terry Teachout, writer
- Roy Thomas, comic book writer (Marvel and DC Comics) and editor (Marvel), screenwriter
- Louis C. Wagner, Jr., United States Army four-star general
- Robert Henry Whitelaw, U.S. Congressman from Missouri (1890-1891)

== Politics ==
=== Local ===
Since the late 20th century voters at the local level have switched from the Democratic Party to the Republican Party, which is now predominant in Cape Girardeau County. Republicans hold all of the elected positions in the county.

Cape Girardeau County, Missouri

Elected countywide officials
Assessor	Robert Adams	Republican
Auditor	Pete Frazier	Republican
Circuit Clerk	Ashley Schuessler	Republican
County Clerk	Kara Clark Summers	Republican
Collector	Barbara Gholson	Republican
Commissioner (presiding)	Clint Tracy	Republican
Commissioner (district 1)	Steve Daume	Republican
Commissioner (district 2)	Charles J. Herbst III	Republican
Coroner	Craig Williams	Republican
Prosecuting Attorney	Mark Welker	Republican
Public Administrator	Kyla Biester	Republican
Recorder	Drew Blattner	Republican
Sheriff	Ruth Ann Dickerson	Republican
Treasurer	Ronnie Maxwell	Republican

=== State ===
Past gubernatorial elections results
Year	Republican	Democratic	Third parties
2024	74.25% 29,523	23.65% 9,405	2.10% 834
2020	72.53% 29,127	25.58% 10,272	1.90% 762
2016	65.70% 24,209	31.31% 11,539	2.99% 1,101
2012	56.02% 19,797	41.56% 14,686	2.43% 857
2008	56.23% 20,672	41.75% 15,348	2.02% 744
2004	65.26% 22,433	33.49% 11,511	1.25% 429
2000	62.50% 18,543	35.36% 10,491	2.14% 635
1996	49.68% 13,781	48.38% 13,422	1.94% 538
1992	54.41% 15,080	45.59% 12,636	0.00% 0
1988	70.08% 17,336	29.50% 7,298	0.42% 104
1984	70.39% 17,299	29.61% 7,276	0.00% 0
1980	66.50% 16,197	33.11% 8,064	0.39% 96
1976	56.62% 13,079	43.35% 10,013	0.03% 7
1972	57.09% 12,656	42.05% 9,322	0.85% 189
1968	37.96% 7,217	62.04% 11,795	0.00% 0
1964	42.74% 8,506	57.26% 11,396	0.00% 0
1960	49.07% 9,384	50.93% 9,739	0.00% 0

In the Missouri House of Representatives, Cape Girardeau County is divided into two legislative districts, both of which are represented by Republicans.

- District 146 – Consists of most of the entire county outside of the city of Cape Girardeau, although a small portion of the northern edge of the city is included in this district. The district also takes in all of the city of Jackson as well as the communities of Pocahontas, Oak Ridge, Old Appleton, Gordonville, Dutchtown, Delta, Allenville, and Whitewater. It is currently represented by Barry Hovis (R-Whitewater).

Missouri House of Representatives – District 146 – Cape Girardeau County (2020)
Party	Candidate	Votes	%	±%
Republican	Barry Hovis	21,012	100.00%	+18.11

Missouri House of Representatives – District 146 – Cape Girardeau County (2018)
Party	Candidate	Votes	%	±%
Republican	Barry Hovis	15,289	81.89%	−18.11
Democratic	Gayla Dace	3,381	18.11%	+18.11

Missouri House of Representatives – District 146 – Cape Girardeau County (2016)
Party	Candidate	Votes	%	±%
Republican	Donna Lichtenegger	18,530	98.12%	

Missouri House of Representatives – District 146 – Cape Girardeau County (2014)
Party	Candidate	Votes	%	±%
Republican	Donna Lichtenegger	7,933	98.34%	

Missouri House of Representatives – District 146 – Cape Girardeau County (2012)
Party	Candidate	Votes	%	±%
Republican	Donna Lichtenegger	16,824	98.37%	

- District 147 – Consists of most of the city of Cape Girardeau and a small sliver of the mostly rural stretch of Highway 74 to Dutchtown. The seat is currently vacant after Wallingford resigned in January 2022.

Missouri House of Representatives – District 147 – Cape Girardeau County (2020)
Party	Candidate	Votes	%	±%
Republican	Wayne Wallingford	10,167	63.14%	−1.64
Democratic	Andy Leighton	5,935	36.86%	+1.64

Missouri House of Representatives – District 147 – Cape Girardeau County (2018)
Party	Candidate	Votes	%	±%
Republican	Kathy Swan	8,616	64.78%	−8.88
Democratic	Renita Green	4,685	35.22%	+8.88

Missouri House of Representatives – District 147 – Cape Girardeau County (2016)
Party	Candidate	Votes	%	±%
Republican	Kathy Swan	10,575	73.15%	
Libertarian	Greg Tlapek	3,782	26.16%	

Missouri House of Representatives – District 147 – Cape Girardeau County (2014)
Party	Candidate	Votes	%	±%
Republican	Kathy Swan	5,214	69.37%	
Democratic	Gary Gaines	1,676	22.30%	
Libertarian	Greg Tlapek	615	8.18%	

Missouri House of Representatives – District 147 – Cape Girardeau County (2012)
Party	Candidate	Votes	%	±%
Republican	Kathy Swan	12,546	97.30%	

In the Missouri Senate, all of Cape Girardeau County is a part of Missouri's 27th district and is currently represented by Holly Thompson Rehder (R-Sikeston.

Missouri Senate – District 27 – Cape Girardeau County (2020)
Party	Candidate	Votes	%	±%
Republican	Holly Rehder	28,941	73.58%	−2.01
Democratic	Donnie Owens	10,391	26.42%	+2.01

Missouri Senate – District 27 – Cape Girardeau County (2016)
Party	Candidate	Votes	%	±%
Republican	Wayne Wallingford	27,062	75.59%	
Democratic	Donnie Owens	8,739	24.41%	

Missouri Senate – District 27 – Cape Girardeau County (2012)
Party	Candidate	Votes	%	±%
Republican	Wayne Wallingford	29,734	98.09%	

=== Federal ===
All of Cape Girardeau County is included in Missouri's 8th congressional district and is currently represented by Jason Smith (R-Salem) in the U.S. House of Representatives. Smith was elected to a fifth term in 2020 over Democratic challenger Kathy Ellis.

U.S. House of Representatives – Missouri’s 8th congressional district – Cape Girardeau County (2020)
Party	Candidate	Votes	%	±%
Republican	Jason Smith	29,028	72.93%	−0.54
Democratic	Kathy Ellis	10,036	25.21%	+0.25
Libertarian	Tom Schmitz	739	1.86%	+0.29

U.S. House of Representatives – Missouri's 8th congressional district – Cape Girardeau County (2018)
Party	Candidate	Votes	%	±%
Republican	Jason Smith	23,687	73.47%	−0.94
Democratic	Kathy Ellis	8,048	24.96%	+2.66
Libertarian	Jonathan L. Shell	505	1.57%	−1.72

Cape Girardeau County, along with the rest of the state of Missouri, is represented in the U.S. Senate by Josh Hawley (R-Columbia) and Roy Blunt (R-Strafford).

U.S. Senate – Class I – Cape Girardeau County (2018)
Party	Candidate	Votes	%	±%
Republican	Josh Hawley	22,964	70.65%	+16.98
Democratic	Claire McCaskill	8,886	27.34%	−13.49
Libertarian	Japheth Campbell	307	0.95%	−4.55
Independent	Craig O'Dear	232	0.71%	
Green	Jo Crain	114	0.35%	+0.35

Blunt was elected to a second term in 2016 over then-Missouri Secretary of State Jason Kander.

U.S. Senate - Class III - Cape Girardeau County (2016)
Party	Candidate	Votes	%	±%
Republican	Roy Blunt	24,173	65.66%	
Democratic	Jason Kander	11,219	30.47%	
Libertarian	Jonathan Dine	863	2.34%	
Green	Johnathan McFarland	289	0.79%	
Constitution	Fred Ryman	268	0.73%	

==== Political culture ====
United States presidential election results for Cape Girardeau County, Missouri
Year	Republican		Democratic		Third party(ies)	
Year	No.	%	No.	%	No.	%
1888	2,198	51.02%	1,894	43.96%	216	5.01%
1892	2,203	47.83%	1,996	43.33%	407	8.84%
1896	2,482	49.60%	2,473	49.42%	49	0.98%
1900	2,778	52.58%	2,318	43.88%	187	3.54%
1904	3,090	56.31%	2,187	39.86%	210	3.83%
1908	3,381	55.51%	2,621	43.03%	89	1.46%
1912	2,203	37.63%	2,587	44.19%	1,064	18.18%
1916	3,753	54.60%	2,993	43.55%	127	1.85%
1920	7,537	61.41%	4,584	37.35%	152	1.24%
1924	6,076	52.08%	4,967	42.58%	623	5.34%
1928	7,344	57.25%	5,464	42.59%	21	0.16%
1932	5,796	40.51%	8,394	58.67%	117	0.82%
1936	7,374	45.16%	8,892	54.45%	64	0.39%
1940	9,297	51.71%	8,642	48.07%	39	0.22%
1944	8,339	54.88%	6,845	45.05%	11	0.07%
1948	7,084	47.32%	7,872	52.58%	15	0.10%
1952	10,729	57.42%	7,933	42.46%	22	0.12%
1956	10,638	58.22%	7,633	41.78%	0	0.00%
1960	11,331	58.10%	8,172	41.90%	0	0.00%
1964	8,776	43.43%	11,431	56.57%	0	0.00%
1968	10,298	53.34%	6,656	34.48%	2,351	12.18%
1972	15,693	71.42%	6,280	28.58%	0	0.00%
1976	12,607	54.42%	10,440	45.07%	117	0.51%
1980	14,861	60.54%	8,625	35.13%	1,063	4.33%
1984	17,404	70.32%	7,346	29.68%	0	0.00%
1988	16,583	67.53%	7,904	32.19%	69	0.28%
1992	13,464	47.48%	9,605	33.87%	5,286	18.64%
1996	15,557	56.32%	9,957	36.05%	2,108	7.63%
2000	19,832	66.42%	9,334	31.26%	693	2.32%
2004	23,814	68.90%	10,568	30.57%	183	0.53%
2008	24,768	66.14%	12,208	32.60%	470	1.26%
2012	25,370	70.81%	9,728	27.15%	731	2.04%
2016	27,017	72.41%	8,492	22.76%	1,802	4.83%
2020	28,907	71.68%	10,760	26.68%	661	1.64%
2024	29,315	72.65%	10,561	26.17%	477	1.18%

Cape Girardeau County is something of an outlier in southern Missouri. Unusually for a rural Southern county (straddling the Mississippi embayment), it has generally voted Republican since the Civil War, this was due to Unionist sentiment in the county. In contrast, much of southern Missouri was solidly Democratic for much of the 20th century before swinging heavily Republican at the turn of the millennium.

After voting for Lincoln in 1864 and Grant in 1868, Cape Girardeau County voted Democratic four times in a row. Since 1888, it has voted Democratic only in Franklin Roosevelt's and Lyndon Johnson's 40-state landslides of 1932, 1936, and 1964; in the three-way race in 1912 (when it gave Woodrow Wilson a plurality); and for Missouri native Harry Truman in 1948. Unlike most demographically similar counties, it rejected Jimmy Carter in 1976; Carter is the last Democrat to manage even 40 percent of the county's vote.

Like most areas throughout rural Missouri, voters in Cape Girardeau County generally adhere to socially and culturally conservative principles which have influenced their shift to Republicans. In 2004, Missourians voted on a constitutional amendment to define marriage as the union between a man and a woman—it overwhelmingly passed Cape Girardeau County with 83.19 percent of the vote. The initiative passed the state with 71 percent of support, as Missouri became the first state to ban same-sex marriage. In 2006, Cape Girardeau County voted against a state constitutional amendment to fund and legalize embryonic stem cell research, with 63.12 percent opposed. The initiative narrowly passed the state with 51 percent of support, and Missouri became one of the first states to approve such research. Cape Girardeau County's voters have supported such populist causes as increasing the minimum wage. In 2006, Cape Girardeau County voted to increase the minimum wage to $6.50 an hour with 60.04 percent of the vote. The proposition strongly passed every county in Missouri, with 75.94 percent voting in favor. (During the same election, voters in five other states also strongly approved increases in the minimum wage.)

=== Missouri presidential preference primaries ===
==== 2020 ====
The 2020 presidential primaries for both the Democratic and Republican parties were held in Missouri on March 10. On the Democratic side, former Vice President Joe Biden (D-Delaware) both won statewide and carried Cape Girardeau County by a wide margin. Biden went on to defeat President Donald Trump in the general election.

Missouri Democratic presidential primary – Cape Girardeau County (2020)
Party	Candidate	Votes	%	±%
Democratic	Joe Biden	3,030	56.54	
Democratic	Bernie Sanders	2,064	38.52	
Democratic	Tulsi Gabbard	50	0.93	
Democratic	Others/Uncommitted	215	4.01	

Incumbent President Donald Trump (R-Florida) faced a primary challenge from former Massachusetts Governor Bill Weld, but won both Cape Girardeau County and statewide by overwhelming margins.

Missouri Republican presidential primary – Cape Girardeau County (2020)
Party	Candidate	Votes	%	±%
Republican	Donald Trump	5,277	98.05	
Republican	Bill Weld	21	0.39	
Republican	Others/Uncommitted	84	1.56	

==== 2016 ====
The 2016 presidential primaries for both the Republican and Democratic parties were held in Missouri on March 15. Businessman Donald Trump (R-New York) narrowly won the state overall, but Senator Ted Cruz (R-Texas) carried a plurality of the vote in Cape Girardeau County. Trump went on to win the nomination and the presidency.

Missouri Republican presidential primary – Cape Girardeau County (2016)
Party	Candidate	Votes	%	±%
Republican	Ted Cruz	7,404	46.61	
Republican	Donald Trump	6,192	38.98	
Republican	John Kasich	1,257	7.91	
Republican	Marco Rubio	701	4.41	
Republican	Others/Uncommitted	330	2.08	

On the Democratic side, former Secretary of State Hillary Clinton (D-New York) narrowly won statewide, but Senator Bernie Sanders (I-Vermont) carried a majority of the vote in Cape Girardeau County.

Missouri Democratic presidential primary – Cape Girardeau County (2016)
Party	Candidate	Votes	%	±%
Democratic	Bernie Sanders	2,375	52.36	
Democratic	Hillary Clinton	2,116	46.65	
Democratic	Others/Uncommitted	45	0.99	

==== 2012 ====
The 2012 Missouri Republican presidential primary's results were nonbinding on the state's national convention delegates. Voters in Cape Girardeau County supported former U.S. Senator Rick Santorum (R-Pennsylvania), who finished first in the state at large, but eventually lost the nomination to former Governor Mitt Romney (R-Massachusetts). Delegates to the congressional district and state conventions were chosen at a county caucus, which selected a delegation favoring Santorum. Incumbent President Barack Obama easily won the Missouri Democratic Primary and renomination. He defeated Romney in the general election.

==== 2008 ====
In 2008, the Missouri Republican presidential primary was closely contested, with Senator John McCain (R-Arizona) prevailing and eventually winning the nomination. However, former Governor Mitt Romney (R-Massachusetts) won a plurality in Cape Girardeau County.

Missouri Republican presidential primary – Cape Girardeau County (2008)
Party	Candidate	Votes	%	±%
Republican	Mitt Romney	3,922	35.32	
Republican	John McCain	3,528	31.77	
Republican	Mike Huckabee	3,068	27.63	
Republican	Ron Paul	361	3.25	
Republican	Others/Uncommitted	226	2.04	

Then-Senator Hillary Clinton (D-New York) received more votes than any candidate from either party in Cape Girardeau County during the 2008 presidential primary. Despite initial reports that Clinton had won Missouri, Barack Obama (D-Illinois), also a Senator at the time, narrowly defeated her statewide and later became that year's Democratic nominee, going on to win the presidency.

Missouri Democratic presidential primary – Cape Girardeau County (2008)
Party	Candidate	Votes	%	±%
Democratic	Hillary Clinton	4,510	56.55	
Democratic	Barack Obama	3,145	39.44	
Democratic	Others/Uncommitted	320	4.02	

== See also ==
- National Register of Historic Places listings in Cape Girardeau County, Missouri
