= Frances Ginsberg =

American opera soprano

- Born: March 11, 1955; St. Louis, Missouri
- Died: December 24, 2010 (aged 55); Bronx, New York City
- Education: University of Kansas
- Occupation: Opera singer

Frances Ginsberg (March 11, 1955 – December 24, 2010) was an American opera singer. Opera News magazine described her as "a lirico-spinto soprano of striking temperament whose vivid style made her an audience favorite at New York City Opera and other U.S. companies in the 1980s and 1990s."

== Life and career ==
Ginsberg was born to Jewish parents in St. Louis, Missouri in 1955. In 1973, she graduated from Ladue Horton Watkins High School in Ladue, Missouri, and in 1979 she graduated from the University of Kansas with fine arts degrees in theatre and voice. She then pursued further studies at the Lyric Opera of Chicago's Center for American Artists. She later studied opera privately with Carlo Bergonzi, Renata Tebaldi and Eve Queler. She also studied with conductor Marco Munari of La Scala, while living in Milan.

Still a college student, she made her professional opera debut in 1977 at the Santa Fe Opera as the milliner in the United States premiere of Nino Rota's The Italian Straw Hat. Her first major success came in 1986 when she made her debut at the New York City Opera (NYCO) in the dual roles of Margherita and Elena in Arrigo Boito's Mefistofele. She subsequently appeared with the NYCO as Donna Elvira in Wolfgang Amadeus Mozart's Don Giovanni, Mimì in Giacomo Puccini's La bohème, and Violetta in Giuseppe Verdi's La traviata. In 1990 she made her debut at the Metropolitan Opera as Rosalinde in Johann Strauss II's Die Fledermaus.

Other US companies Ginsberg performed with during her career were Cincinnati Opera, Fort Worth Opera, Houston Grand Opera, Pittsburgh Opera, San Diego Opera, Santa Fe Opera, Utah Opera, and the Washington National Opera. On the international stage she made appearances with, among others, the Opéra de Nice, the Opéra Royal de Wallonie, the Scottish Opera and the Welsh National Opera. Some of the other roles she performed on stage were Abigaille in Nabucco, Amelia in Un ballo in maschera, Cio-Cio-San in Madama Butterfly, Desdemona in Otello, Donna Anna in Don Giovanni, Elvira in Ernani, Lady Macbeth in Macbeth, Leonora in Il trovatore, Leonora in La forza del destino, Magda in La Rondine, Nedda in Pagliacci, and the title heroines in Aida, Manon Lescaut, Norma and Tosca.

== Death ==
She abandoned her career in 2007 after being diagnosed with ovarian cancer. Ginsberg died in 2010 at age 55 in The Bronx (Riverdale), New York of ovarian cancer which had metastasized to her brain and spine.
