= Myseum =

Children's museum in Town and Country, Missouri

Myseum is a children's museum and indoor playground located at 283 Lamp and Lantern Village, in Town and Country, Missouri. It was established by Jana and Jeffrey Deutch and opened in 2012.
