= Stacy Washington =

American political commentator

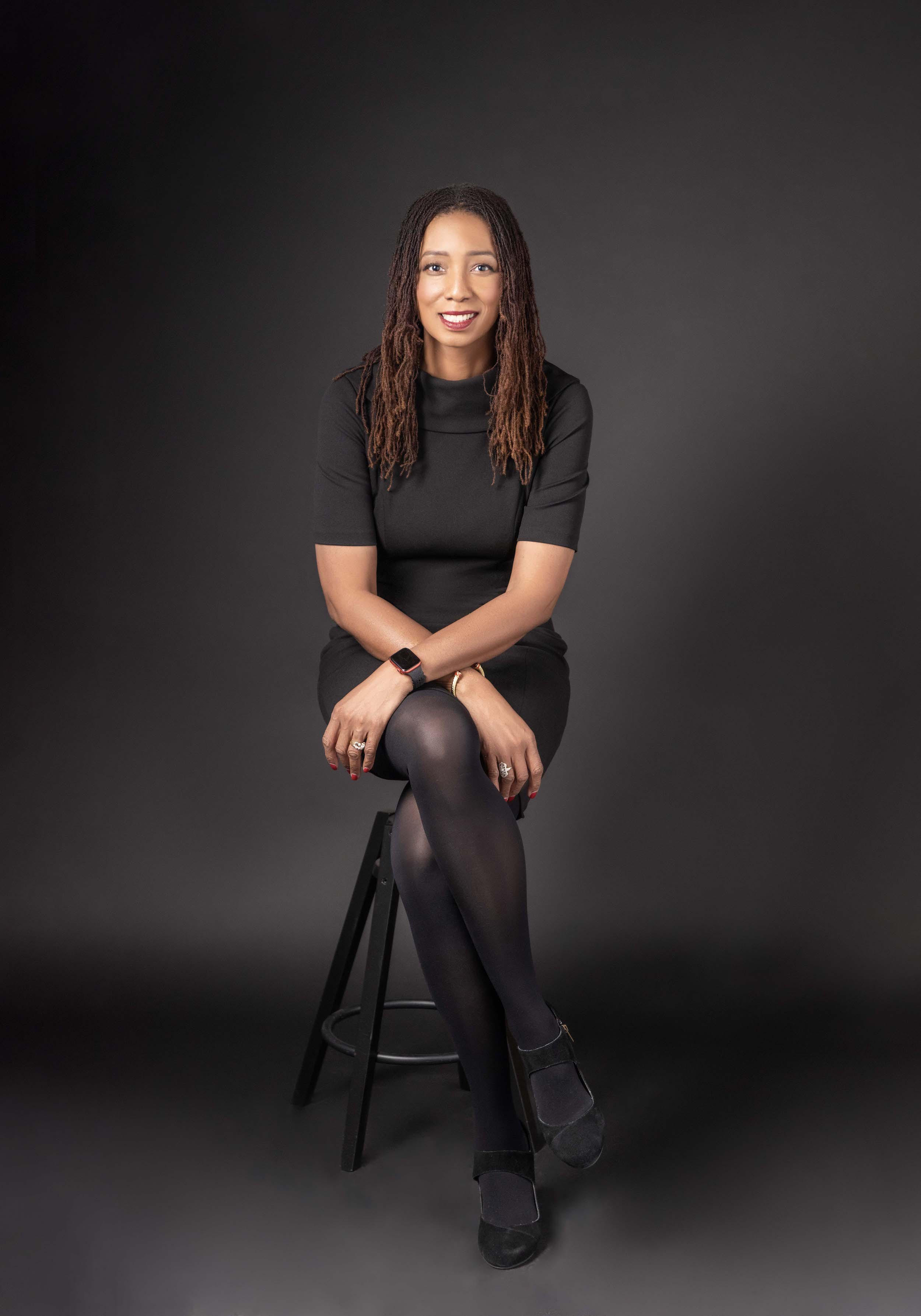
- Occupations: Radio host, political commentator
- Known for: Host of Stacy on the Right

Stacy Washington is an American conservative radio host and political commentator. She has hosted the nationally syndicated radio program Stacy on the Right and has participated in Republican political activism. She previously served on the Ladue School District Board of Education in St. Louis County, Missouri, and wrote a column for the St. Louis Post-Dispatch.

== Early life and military service ==
Washington served in the United States Air Force before working in radio and political commentary.

== Ladue school board ==
Washington served as a member of the Ladue School District Board of Education in St. Louis County, Missouri. She was one of seven board members in 2013, participating in district operations and educational oversight.

== Broadcasting and political commentary ==
Washington worked as a radio host and political commentator in the St. Louis area. In August 2016, Radio Ink reported that Washington, then a host on KFTK-FM, filmed an interview with the National Rifle Association (NRA) for a documentary. The publication also noted that she hosted Stacy on the Right and appeared on NRA News.

In 2020, Mediaite described Washington as a long-time conservative activist, noting her support for Mitt Romney during the 2012 presidential election and her authorship for conservative publications prior to joining Donald Trump's political movement.

== St. Louis Post-Dispatch controversy ==
Washington began writing columns for the St. Louis Post-Dispatch in October 2016. iMediaEthics reported that the newspaper had previously published a news article detailing Washington's participation in an NRA documentary, titled "St. Louis radio host to be featured in NRA documentary."

In April 2017, Washington published a column titled "Guns and the media" in response to commentary comparing the NRA to the Islamic State. The Post-Dispatch subsequently suspended Washington, citing a failure to disclose her professional involvement with NRA Television. Washington stated that her relationship with the organization had been transparent, pointing to the newspaper's prior coverage of her documentary appearance, and noted that she was not a paid employee of the NRA.

According to iMediaEthics, Washington had worked as a commentator and co-host for NRA Television and participated in an NRA documentary. Following the suspension, Washington resigned from the newspaper. The Post-Dispatch later published an editor's note stating her columns would no longer appear due to an alleged conflict of interest. The dispute was also covered by Fox News and Fox Business.

== Political activity ==
Washington became active in Republican political campaigns during the 2020 presidential election, serving on advisory boards for Trump's campaign, including Black Voices for Trump and Veterans for Trump.

Washington appeared in a 2020 Republican National Convention video highlighting Black voters who supported Trump. Media coverage noted her earlier conservative activism, including her support for Mitt Romney in 2012 and her work with conservative media and political organizations. She was also featured in media coverage focused on Black conservatives supporting Trump's reelection.

== Radio ==
Washington continued her broadcasting career, and in June 2020, The Washington Times reported that she had been assigned a new program on SiriusXM Patriot.
