= St. Louis County Department of Public Health =

Department of the government of St. Louis County, Missouri

St. Louis County Department of Public Health is a department of the government of St. Louis County, Missouri. The department is headquartered in Berkeley.

== History ==
Faisal Khan became head of the department in 2021. In 2026, he became the head of the St. Louis City health department.

== Agencies ==
=== Animal shelter ===
St. Louis County Animal Care and Control is an agency of the department. The office and animal shelter are in Olivette.

In the years prior to 2022, according to Kelsey Landis of the St. Louis Post-Dispatch, this shelter was "beset by euthanasia scandals, overpopulation, poor conditions and other problems." In December 2022, the county began contracting operations of the shelter to Animal Protective Association (APA), a nonprofit organization. Landis wrote that the APA "cleaned up the shelter" and "was lauded for its work."

The contract was supposed to run to circa 2028, but in 2025 the APA chose to end its involvement as the county had disputed some expenses paid to the APA. In 2025 the county was scheduled to take direct control. This was effective on February 21 of that year.
