= Courtney Van Buren =

American football player (born 1980)

No. 71, 72, 77
- Position: Offensive tackle

Personal information
- Born: February 22, 1980 (age 46); St. Louis, Missouri, U.S.
- Listed height: 6 ft 7 in (2.01 m)
- Listed weight: 350 lb (159 kg)

Career information
- High school: Ladue Horton Watkins (Ladue, Missouri)
- College: Arkansas–Pine Bluff
- NFL draft: 2003: 3rd round, 80th overall pick

Career history
- San Diego Chargers (2003–2005); Detroit Lions (2006)

Career NFL statistics
- Games played: 9
- Games started: 7
- Stats at Pro Football Reference

Courtney Van Buren (born February 22, 1980) is an American former professional football player who was an offensive tackle for the San Diego Chargers of the National Football League (NFL). He played college football for the Arkansas–Pine Bluff Golden Lions.

== Early life ==
Van Buren is from St. Louis, Missouri and in 1998 graduated from Ladue Horton Watkins High School, where he played football and was a two-time Missouri state track finalist in the shot put, placing as high as third.

== College career ==
He played college football at the University of Arkansas at Pine Bluff where he was an All-SWAC athlete on both the Football and Track teams.

== Professional career ==
Van Buren was selected by the San Diego Chargers in the 3rd round (80th overall) of the 2003 NFL draft. In 2006, he signed with the Detroit Lions for one year and sustained another severe injury to his knees, which (along with his back) were problematic throughout his career, subsequently forcing him into retirement. He was waived by the Lions on August 3, 2006.

== Off the field ==
Van Buren has made occasional appearances on television and radio as a color commentator, and is also very involved in various social and political causes.

A Spring '00 initiate of the Gamma Sigma chapter of Kappa Alpha Psi fraternity.

Courtney also has 3 children Courtney Van Buren Jr, Maasai Van Buren, and Gaia Van Buren

Courtney's parents are radio personality Doug Banks and Michelle Van Buren an executive with the U.S. Department of Housing and Urban Development.
