= Logos High School =

Private school in Olivette, Missouri

Location
- 9137 Old Bonhomme Road; Olivette, Missouri 63132; United States; 38.667021°N 90.366271°W

Information
- Type: Private
- Established: September 14, 1970; 56 years ago
- President: Kathleen Boyd-Fenger
- Grades: 6–12
- Enrollment: 95–110
- Campus: Suburban
- Colors: Navy and gold
- Nickname: Lions
- Accreditation: Independent Schools Association of the Central States (ISACS)
- Tuition: $32,000
- Website: logosschool.org

Logos High School is an independent private high school located in Olivette, Missouri. It is accredited through the Independent Schools Association of the Central States (ISACS).

== History ==
Logos High School was founded in 1970 in a warehouse. It was originally founded to assist troubled adolescents obtain a GED. Within a year, the mission had expanded to giving a full high school education to troubled teens. The original layout of the school was classrooms with pillows and sofas instead of chairs and desks. Student Therapy was introduced from the start of Logos High School to help students. Eventually the school grew into a 4-year program and leased and later bought a former grade school from Ladue School District.

In 1991, the school expanded to include grades 7–8 with their own separate class room. In 2008, the school expanded to include 6th grade as well. Since Logos High's inception, over 2,000 adolescents have graduated from the high school. 92% of students go to college, while 99% graduate high school. With a student-teacher ratio of 6–1, Logos High School shows itself as an alternative for students who cannot succeed in a traditional high school setting. In an interview with St. Louis Public Radio, Dr. Boyd-Fenger says many students leave after 2 years for public high schools after "being pointed in the right direction" and vigorous discussion between staff, parents and administration. The school annually receives $1 million from various alumni and donors for financial aid for incoming students.
