= Stacy Park =

Public park in Olivette, Missouri

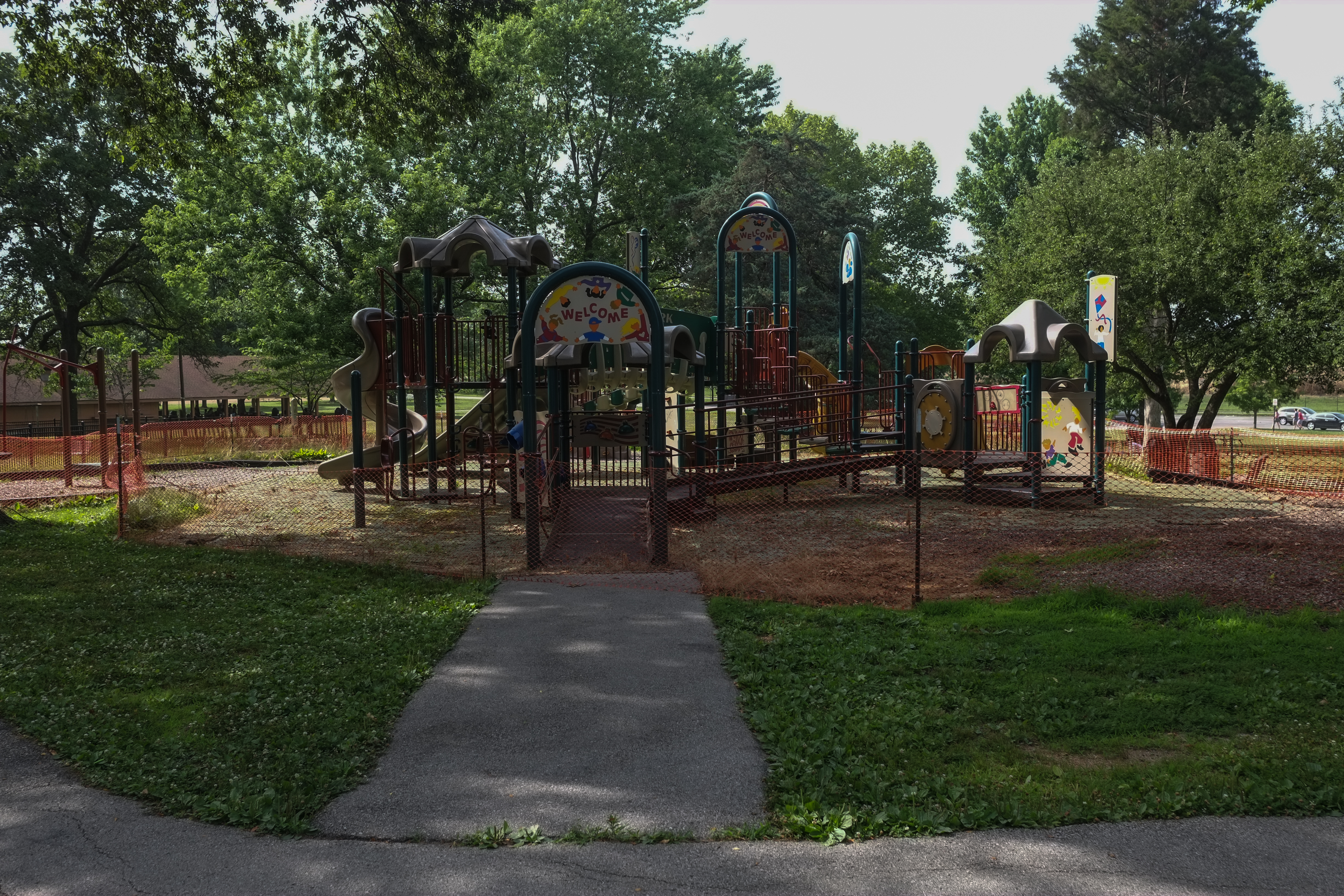
- Interactive map of Stacy Park
- Type: Suburban Park
- Location: Olivette, MO
- Coordinates: 38.6707738°N 90.3921644°W
- Area: 35 acres (14 ha)
- Created: 1926
- Operator: Olivette Parks and Recreation
- Status: Open all year
- Public transit: MetroBus

Stacy Park is a 35-acre public park in Olivette, Missouri.

== History ==
The area that became Stacy Park was originally occupied by a natural pond known as "Bock's Pond". It was a common recreation spot in Mid-County. In 1926, St. Louis decided to build a reservoir here since it was one of the highest points above sea level in St. Louis County at 700 feet. Stacy Park formed around the reservoir and became one the primary sources of water for St. Louis. In 1967, the Boy Scouts and Girl Scouts of Olivette raised enough money to erect a flagpole at the park's entrance.

== Amenities ==
Stacy Park is a 35-acre park located on the border of Olivette and Creve Coeur. The park features a pavilion, a 2-mile walking path, a garden, several baseball fields, playground, picnic tables, bathrooms, outdoor grills, a basketball court and one multi-use field. The park also hosts a summer camp for kids and teenagers and offers field trips, swim days, crafts and games.

Stacy Park hosts an annual carnival every July.

== See also ==
- Parks in Greater St. Louis
