= Michael Roarty =

Michael J. Roarty (August 24, 1928 – March 16, 2013) was an American marketing executive for the Anheuser-Busch brewing company. He has been widely credited with turning Anheuser-Busch and its products, including Budweiser, into globally recognized brands through advertising. Roarty created the advertising slogans "This Bud's for you" for Budweiser and "Weekends were made for Michelob." He also oversaw the creation of the Bud Light ad campaign featuring Spuds McKenzie during the late 1980s.

== Biography ==
=== Early life ===
Roarty was born in Detroit, Michigan, on August 24, 1928, to immigrant parents from Ireland. His father, John Roarty, was a member of the Sinn Féin political party. He graduated from University of Detroit, a Jesuit university which is now known as the University of Detroit Mercy.

=== Career ===
Roarty was hired to promote beer to taverns and bars in Detroit's East Side in 1953 while he was still a student at the University of Detroit. The job earned him the nickname "Mr. Budweiser" from bar owners and other neighborhood residents. After college, Roarty worked as am Anheuser-Busch brand manager in Detroit, Chicago, Denver and Kansas City while gradually working his way up in the company.

Roarty became the Vice President and Director of Marketing for Anheuser-Busch from 1977 to 1990. Under Roarty, the company's share of the beer market doubled from 21% to 43%. In 1992 he was the company's executive vice president of corporate marketing and communications.

He created many of the best known beer slogans of the era, including "Weekends were made for Michelob," "This Bud's for you," and "Head for the mountains of Busch" to promote Anheuser-Busch's beer brands. he oversaw the creation and launch of Spuds MacKenzie for Bud Light in 1987.

Roarty also created the "Know when to say when" commercial campaign for Anheuser-Busch, which promoted awareness of alcohol abuse.

Roarty also pioneered sports marketing in the industry and first promoted Anheuser-Busch products at major sporting events. He sponsored race cars and added billboard signage at stadiums.

In 1980, Michael Roarty convinced Anheuser-Busch to give one million dollars to the fledgling sports cable network, ESPN, which had launched in 1979. Under Roarty's advisement, Anheuser-Busch continued to support ESPN during the network's difficult early years. Roarty promoted these investments as a smart business decision by Anheuser-Busch, telling the St. Louis Post-Dispatch in 1994, ""We gave them $1 million that first year. And if we hadn't, they'd have gone under...I believed the beer drinker was a sports lover...The next year we gave them $5 million. I think it turned out to be the best investment we've ever made." In 1993, Sporting News named Roarty the sixth most powerful figure in American sports citing his early commitment to ESPN and his pioneering work on sports advertising.

Roarty was inducted into the Advertising Hall of Fame in 1994. He retired shortly after the honor.

Outside of marketing, Roarty was highly active in the Irish American community. Irish America magazine named his "Irish American of The Year" in 1991. Roarty was grand marshal of the Dublin St. Patrick's Day Parade in 1994, becoming only the fourth American to hold the honor in the parade's history.

Roarty suffered a heart attack at his home in Town and Country, Missouri, on March 15, 2013. He died the next day on March 16, 2013, at Mercy Hospital in Creve Coeur, Missouri, at the age 84. He had suffered from poor health in recent years due to a series of strokes. He was survived by his wife of fifty-eight years, Lillian Roarty; his daughter, his son, and four grandchildren.
