= John Green (producer) =

American TV executive and producer (born 1966/1967)

John Robert Green
- Born: 1966 or 1967 (age 58–59); St. Louis, Missouri, U.S.
- Education: Washington University in St. Louis; Boston University
- Occupation: Television executive
- Spouse: Anthony
- Children: 2

John Robert Green (born 1966/1967) is an American television executive and producer. He is a former Executive Producer of Special Programming and Development at ABC News in New York City. Green is a three-time Emmy winner and recipient of the Peabody Award. He has worked on several of the network's major broadcasts, including Good Morning America, 20/20, and ABC World News Tonight with David Muir.

== Early life and education ==
Green was born in St. Louis, Missouri, in 1966 or 1967, and raised in Olivette, Missouri. He attended Washington University in St. Louis before graduating from Boston University.

== Career ==
Green began his career as an intern at WCVB-TV in Boston. In June 1994, he joined ABC News as a field producer for Good Morning America.

In 2014, Green was named Executive Vice President of Programming & Development for Rock'n Robin Productions, a broadcast and digital production company founded by Robin Roberts.

== Personal life ==
He lives in Holmdel Township, New Jersey, with his husband, Anthony, and their twin children.
