= Olivette, Missouri =

- City

- Location of Olivette, Missouri
- Coordinates: 38°40′21″N 90°22′43″W
- Country: United States
- State: Missouri
- County: St. Louis

Government
  - Mayor: Missy Waldman

Area
  - Total: 2.77 sq mi (7.18 km^{2})
  - Land: 2.77 sq mi (7.18 km^{2})
  - Water: 0 sq mi (0.00 km^{2})
- Elevation: 676 ft (206 m)

Population (2020)
  - Total: 8,504
  - Density: 3,069.5/sq mi (1,185.13/km^{2})
- Time zone: UTC-6 (Central (CST))
  - Summer (DST): UTC-5 (CDT)
- FIPS code: 29-54650
- GNIS feature ID: 2396056
- Website: olivettemo.com

Olivette is an inner-ring suburb of St. Louis, located in St. Louis County, Missouri, United States. The population was 8,504 at the 2020 census.

== History ==
Olivette was settled in the mid-19th century as a small farming community along an old Indian trail originally called the Bonhomme Road (now known as Old Bonhomme, which meets and essentially turns into Olive Boulevard). Olive Road is a ridge road and at one time served as a de facto boundary for housing segregation in outer St. Louis.

The first brick schoolhouse in St. Louis County was built in the 1850s at the corner of Price and Old Bonhomme in Olivette. Logos High School is built on the former grounds of the schoolhouse.

In the 1920s, the city of St. Louis decided to build a water reservoir in Olivette since it was one of the highest points in St. Louis County. The reservoir was built at Brock's Pond, a local recreational spot, and finished in 1926. Stacy Park was formed around the reservoir and is now the largest park in Olivette.

Olivette was incorporated in 1930 by combining the communities of Central, Tower Hill, Olive, and Stratmann. Prior to merging, the area was known as Central due to its centralized location along the Central Plank Road (again, now called Olive Boulevard). In fact, Price Road and Olive Boulevard intersect at the exact midpoint between the Port of St. Louis on the Mississippi River and Howell's Landing on the Missouri River. Central was a high traffic stop for wagons to restock on their journey between the two stops.

Olivette is one of the few communities in St. Louis County that maintains their own municipal fire department and police department.

== Geography ==
According to the United States Census Bureau, the city has a total area of 2.78 square miles (7.20 km^{2}), all land.

Key roads through Olivette include Missouri Route 340 (Olive Boulevard), Price Road, Dielman Road, Old Bonhomme Road and Interstate 170.

Olivette's neighbors include Overland and unincorporated St. Louis County to the north, Creve Coeur to the west, Ladue to the south, and University City to the east. The Monsanto Corporation used to be located partially in Olivette until it was acquired by Bayer in 2018.

== Demographics ==
Historical population
Census	Pop.	Note	%±
1940	987		—
1950	1,761		78.4%
1960	8,257		368.9%
1970	9,156		10.9%
1980	7,952		−13.1%
1990	7,573		−4.8%
2000	7,438		−1.8%
2010	7,737		4.0%
2020	8,504		9.9%
U.S. Decennial Census 2010., 2020

=== Racial and ethnic composition ===
Olivette city, Missouri – Racial and ethnic composition Note: the US Census treats Hispanic/Latino as an ethnic category. This table excludes Latinos from the racial categories and assigns them to a separate category. Hispanics/Latinos may be of any race.
Race / Ethnicity (NH = Non-Hispanic)	Pop 2000	Pop 2010	Pop 2020	% 2000	% 2010	% 2020
White alone (NH)	5,172	4,606	4,381	69.53%	59.53%	51.52%
Black or African American alone (NH)	1,625	1,839	1,904	21.85%	23.77%	22.39%
Native American or Alaska Native alone (NH)	5	13	13	0.07%	0.17%	0.15%
Asian alone (NH)	372	824	1,416	5.00%	10.65%	16.65%
Native Hawaiian or Pacific Islander alone (NH)	1	3	0	0.01%	0.04%	0.00%
Other race alone (NH)	22	13	30	0.30%	0.17%	0.35%
Mixed race or Multiracial (NH)	124	181	462	1.67%	2.34%	5.43%
Hispanic or Latino (any race)	117	258	298	1.57%	3.33%	3.50%
Total	7,438	7,737	8,504	100.00%	100.00%	100.00%

=== 2020 census ===
As of the 2020 census, Olivette had a population of 8,504. The median age was 40.3 years. 27.7% of residents were under the age of 18 and 17.0% of residents were 65 years of age or older. For every 100 females there were 94.7 males, and for every 100 females age 18 and over there were 86.2 males age 18 and over.

100.0% of residents lived in urban areas, while 0.0% lived in rural areas.

There were 3,148 households in Olivette, of which 41.9% had children under the age of 18 living in them. Of all households, 56.4% were married-couple households, 13.1% were households with a male householder and no spouse or partner present, and 27.2% were households with a female householder and no spouse or partner present. About 22.1% of all households were made up of individuals and 10.8% had someone living alone who was 65 years of age or older.

There were 3,300 housing units, of which 4.6% were vacant. The homeowner vacancy rate was 0.8% and the rental vacancy rate was 6.6%. The average household size was 2.5 and the average family size was 3.0.

=== Income and poverty ===
The 2016–2020 5-year American Community Survey estimates show that the median household income was $90,123 (with a margin of error of +/- $8,282) and the median family income was $104,349 (+/- $14,773). Males had a median income of $59,375 (+/- $14,071) versus $36,895 (+/- $9,563) for females. The median income for those above 16 years old was $43,909 (+/- $15,117). Approximately, 1.7% of families and 3.3% of the population were below the poverty line, including 2.2% of those under the age of 18 and 3.2% of those ages 65 or over.

=== 2010 census ===
At the 2010 census there were 7,737 people, 3,068 households, and 2,216 families living in the city. The population density was 2,783.1 inhabitants per square mile (1,074.6/km^{2}). There were 3,275 housing units at an average density of 1,178.1 per square mile (454.9/km^{2}). The racial makeup of the city was 60.9% White, 23.9% African American, 0.2% Native American, 10.7% Asian, 1.7% from other races, and 2.6% from two or more races. Hispanic or Latino of any race were 3.3%.

Of the 3,068 households 35.8% had children under the age of 18 living with them, 54.0% were married couples living together, 14.4% had a female householder with no husband present, 3.9% had a male householder with no wife present, and 27.8% were non-families. 24.1% of households were one person and 10.1% were one person aged 65 or older. The average household size was 2.52 and the average family size was 3.00.

The median age was 41.8 years. 25.6% of residents were under the age of 18; 6% were between the ages of 18 and 24; 22.7% were from 25 to 44; 29.4% were from 45 to 64; and 16.4% were 65 or older. The gender makeup of the city was 46.9% male and 53.1% female.

=== 2000 census ===
At the 2000 census there were 7,438 people, 3,096 households, and 2,173 families living in the city. The population density was 2,667.5 inhabitants per square mile (1,029.9/km^{2}). There were 3,231 housing units at an average density of 1,158.7 per square mile (447.4/km^{2}). The racial makup of the city was 70.38% White, 21.90% African American, 0.08% Native American, 5.00% Asian, 0.01% Pacific Islander, 0.75% from other races, and 1.87% from two or more races. Hispanic or Latino of any race were 1.57%.

Of the 3,096 households 31.5% had children under the age of 18 living with them, 54.2% were married couples living together, 12.7% had a female householder with no husband present, and 29.8% were non-families. 25.8% of households were one person and 10.4% were one person aged 65 or older. The average household size was 2.40 and the average family size was 2.91.

The age distribution was 23.8% under the age of 18, 5.8% from 18 to 24, 25.4% from 25 to 44, 27.7% from 45 to 64, and 17.3% 65 or older. The median age was 42 years. For every 100 females, there were 89.0 males. For every 100 females age 18 and over, there were 84.5 males.

The median household income was $57,669 and the median family income was $67,569. Males had a median income of $49,853 versus $35,278 for females. The per capita income for the city was $32,379. About 3.6% of families and 4.3% of the population were below the poverty line, including 3.8% of those under age 18 and 0.7% of those age 65 or over.

== Education ==
The public Ladue School District serves all of Olivette. Old Bonhomme Elementary School is located within the city limits. Ladue Middle School serves middle school student in Olivette. Ladue High School serves high school students in Olivette. Private schools located within the city include Logos High School, Hillcrest Seventh-day Adventist School, Immanuel Lutheran School (Olivette) and Miriam School and Learning Center.

== Parks and recreation ==
Stacy Park is a 35-acre park located on the border of Olivette and Creve Coeur. The park has several walking paths, several multi-use fields, basketball court, pavilion, playground, a prairie garden, several outdoor BBQs and a public restroom. Other parks include Indian Meadows Park, Irv Zeid Park, Villa Park and Warson Park. Part of Centennial Greenway (a part of The Great Rivers Greenway District) is also completed recently.

== Notable people ==
- Sterling K. Brown, actor
- John Green, ABC News executive
- Orlando Cepeda, Hall-of-Fame baseball player
