= Theodore A. Pappas House =

Historic house in Town and Country, Missouri

- U.S. National Register of Historic Places
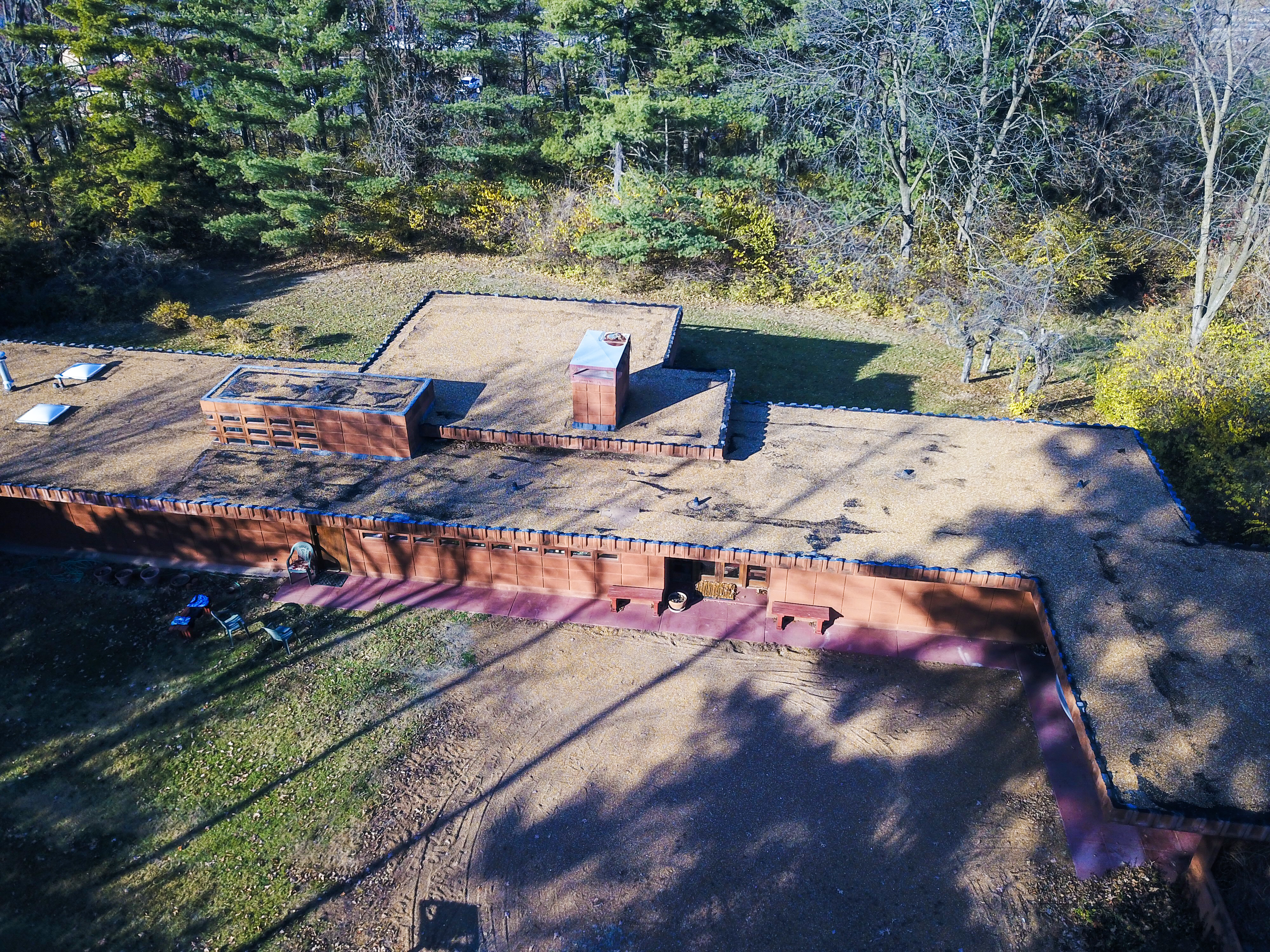
- Theodore A. Pappas House in 2017

- Location within Missouri
- Interactive map showing the Pappas House
- Location: 865 Masonridge Road; Town and Country, cSt. Louis County, Missouri 63141; United States
- Coordinates: 38°38′12.74″N 90°29′3.24″W
- Built: 1955–1964
- Architect: Frank Lloyd Wright
- Architectural style: Usonian
- NRHP reference No.: 79003208
- Added to NRHP: February 14, 1979

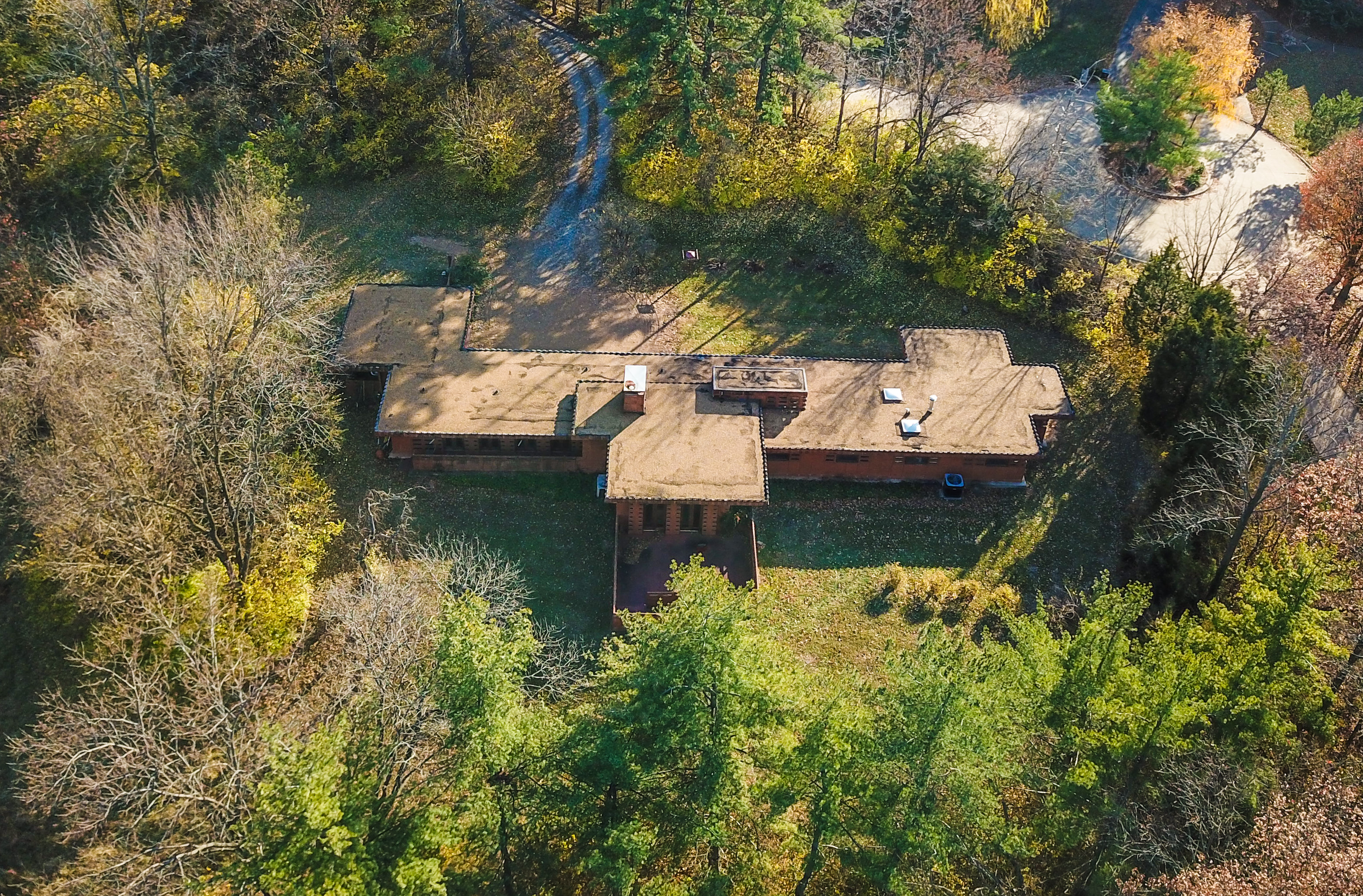
Theodore A. Pappas House, back view

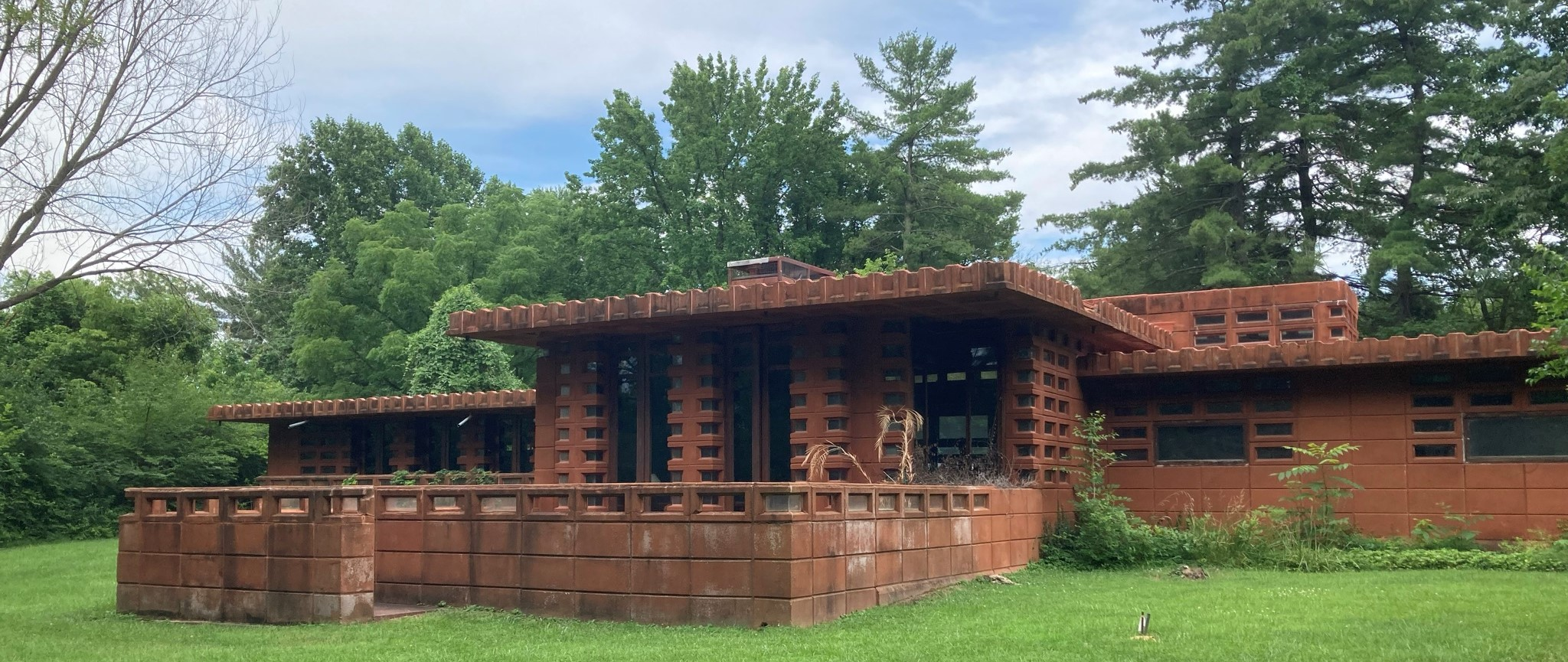
Theodore Pappas House back view closeup

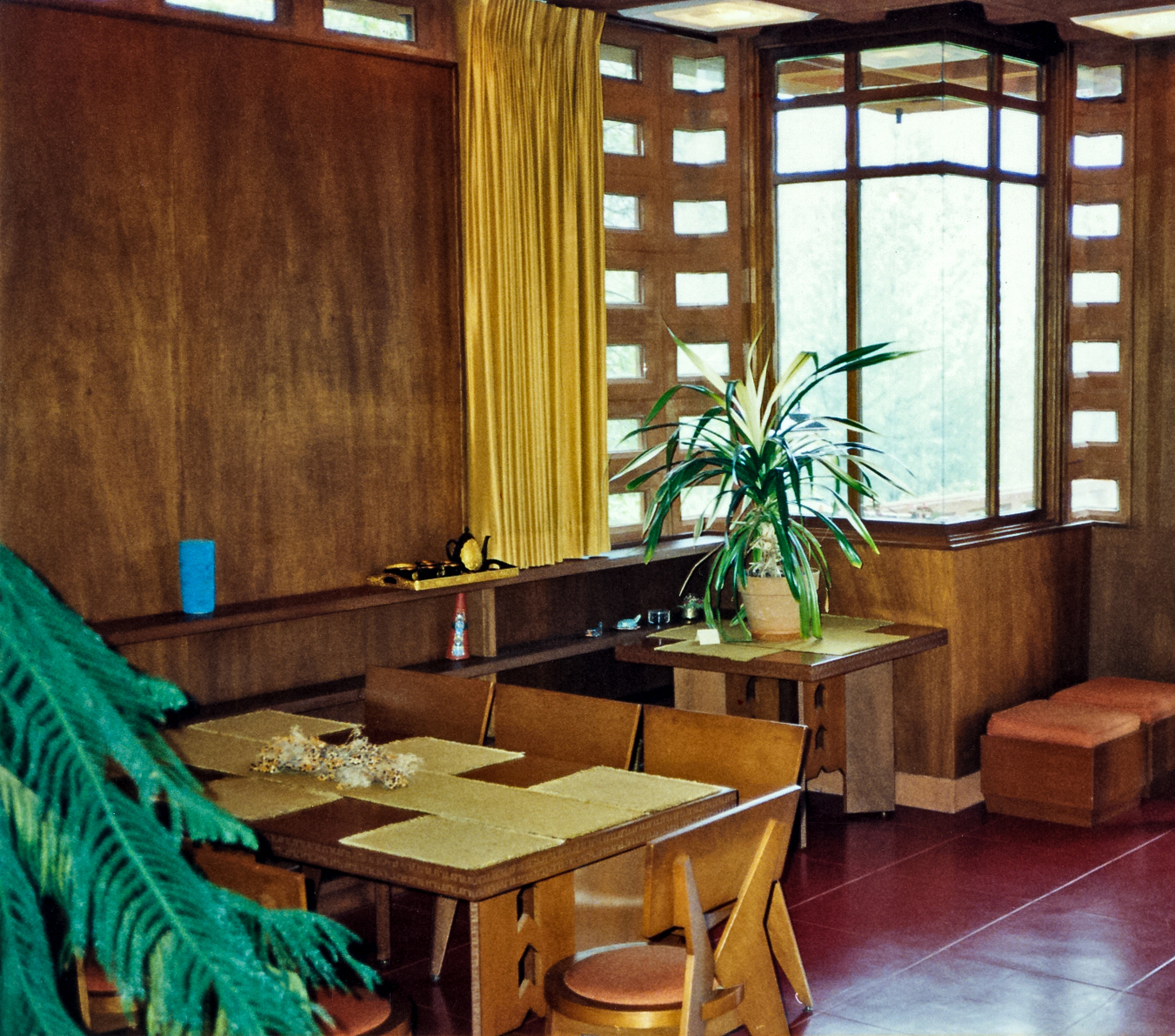
Pappas House Interior Dining Area circa 1992

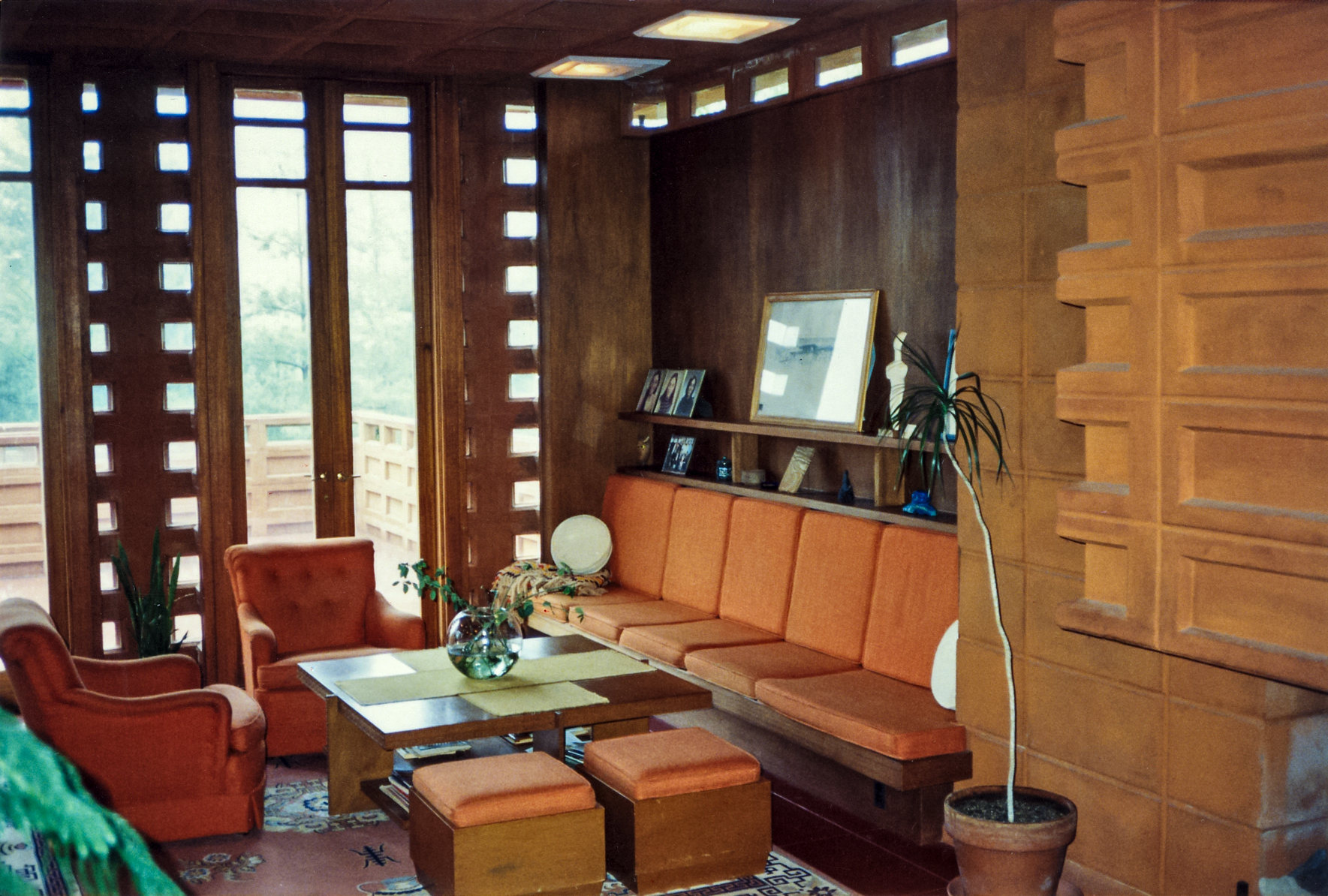
Pappas House Interior Living Area circa 1992

The Theodore A. Pappas House is a Usonian house in Town and Country, Missouri, United States. Designed by Frank Lloyd Wright, the Pappas House was listed on the National Register of Historic Places in 1979. It is one of two houses in St. Louis designed by Wright, and the only Usonian Automatic in Missouri. Wright designed it between 1955 and 1959 at the Pappases' request, and Theodore and Bette Pappas built the house together with the help of day laborers between 1960 and 1964. The Pappas house is a rambling four-bedroom house, and after the Gerald B. and Beverley Tonkens House, is the largest of the Usonian Automatics built.

The entire body of the Pappas House, including the roof, is made up of plain concrete blocks standardized to a module. These blocks were placed on top of and next to one another with no mortar. The hidden sides of each block had hollows through which steel rods were inserted, running vertically and horizontally, creating a "knit" effect. Grout was used to fill the hollows after the rods were in place. Theoretically, all elements of the house could be manufactured and sent to the owners as a sort of "do-it-yourself" kit, the "automatic" aspect of an Usonian Automatic. However, metal molds for the blocks were not available, and the blocks had to be cast in molds created by a local craftsman. The concrete was pretinted according to Wright's idea that color should be in and not on the surface. The color scheme throughout the house is monochromatic, a warm natural, earthen color, complemented by a uniform unstained Philippine mahogany for trim and built in furniture.

In 1985, Bette Pappas wrote a book titled No Passing Fancy (ASIN B000IZVEES) about her house. Bette Pappas died at the home in February 2018 at the age of 91.

In 2020, the house was sold by the Pappas children to the Frank Lloyd Wright Revival Initiative, a non-profit created by filmmaker Michael Miner. It is anticipated the house will be refurbished and turned into a museum and event center. In May 2021, the house was opened for public tours by appointment.

== See also ==
- List of Frank Lloyd Wright works
- National Register of Historic Places listings in St. Louis County, Missouri
