= Ladue Horton Watkins High School =

American high school in Greater St. Louis, Missouri

Location
- 1201 South Warson Road; Ladue, Missouri 63124; United States; 38°38′22″N 90°23′48″W

Information
- Type: Comprehensive public high school
- Established: 1952; 74 years ago
- School district: Ladue School District
- Principal: Brad Griffith
- Teaching staff: 94.20 (FTE)
- Enrollment: 1,325 (2023–24)
- Student to teacher ratio: 14.07
- Campus type: Suburban
- Colors: Blue and white
- Athletics conference: Suburban Conference
- Nickname: Rams
- Rival: Clayton High School
- USNWR ranking: 166th (2013)
- Newspaper: Panorama
- Feeder schools: Ladue Middle School
- Website: lhwhs.ladueschools.net

Ladue Horton Watkins High School is a public high school in Ladue, Missouri, United States, that is administered by the Ladue School District. Its namesake, Horton Watkins, was vice president of the International Shoe Company and died in 1949. The family of Horton Watkins donated the 28-acre (11 ha) tract of land on South Warson Road to the school for the high school site as a memorial.

== Demographics ==
The racial/ethnic breakdown of the 1,313 students enrolled for the 2024–2025 school year was:

- White - 54.9%
- Black - 16.7%
- Asian/Pacific Islander - 16.2%
- Hispanic - 4.8%
- Multiracial - 7.3%
- American Indian/Alaskan Native - 0.1%

The male/female ratio for 2024–25 was:

- Male - 51%
- Female - 49%

In addition, 12% of the students were eligible for free or reduced lunch.

== Activities ==
For the 2011–12 school year, the school offered 26 activities approved by the Missouri State High School Activities Association (MSHSAA): baseball, boys and girls basketball, cheerleading, boys and girls cross country, dance team, field hockey, football, boys golf, girls lacrosse, orchestra, band and vocal music, scholar bowl, boys and girls soccer, girls softball, speech and debate, boys' and girls' swimming and diving, boys' and girls' tennis, boys and girls track and field, girls volleyball, water polo, and wrestling. In addition to its MSHSAA activities, the school offers students an opportunity to participate in a variety of other school-sponsored clubs.

The Ladue Rams have won several state championships:

- Football: 2018
- Boys Soccer: 2024
- Boys' golf: 1960, 1970
- Scholar Bowl: 2006, 2009, 2011, 2012, 2013, 2014, 2018, 2019, 2021
- Boys' swimming and diving: 1957, 1958, 1959, 1960, 1961, 1962, 1963
- Girls swimming and diving: 1976, 2019
- Boys tennis: 1962, 1985, 1995, 2022
- Girls Tennis: 1978, 1988, 1989, 1990, 1991, 1992, 2009, 2022
- Boys track and field: 2003
- Girls track and field: 2005, 2009
- Boys Ice hockey: 1994, 2012 (Founder's Cup), 2021 (Wickenheiser Cup)
- Water Polo: 1973

In 2013 Ladue's Scholar Bowl team won the National Scholastics Championship.

Student activities:

- Football
- Girls and boys swimming
- Water polo
- Softball
- Poms
- Wrestling
- Soccer
- Tennis
- Basketball
- Cheerleading
- Golf
- Lacrosse
- Field Hockey
- Volleyball
- Ladue Hockey
- Baseball
- Track
- Cross Country
- The Ladudes (male a cappella)
- Viva Voce (female a cappella)

== Notable alumni ==
- John H. "Todd" Armstrong '56 - actor, star of Jason and the Argonauts
- Paul William Bucha - '61 - Medal of Honor recipient, US Army, Captain, Vietnam
- Jehu Chesson '12 - football player for the Michigan Wolverines and the Kansas City Chiefs
- Christy Ferer '68 - style commentator and entrepreneur
- Jack Fox '15 - Pro-Bowl punter for the Detroit Lions
- Frances Ginsberg '73 - opera soprano
- Duane Hawthorne '95 - football player
- Marty Hogan '76 - racquetball player
- Willy Holtzman '69 - Award-winning playwright & Screenwriter
- Tal Kopan '05 - journalist
- Stuart Kornfeld '54 - professor of glycobiology
- Karyn Kusama '86 - film director
- Dorothea Lasky '96 - poet
- Jim McKelvey '83 - co-founder of Square, Inc.
- Joel Meyers '72 - sportscaster
- Eric Nenninger '97 - actor
- Elissa L. Newport '65 - scientist
- Jean Passanante '71 - television screenwriter
- Andy Russell '59 - football player
- Becky Sauerbrunn '03 - soccer player, U.S. Women's National Team
- Jeff Smith '92 - politician
- Ben C. Solomon '06 - Pulitzer Prize-winning journalist
- Kevin Spirtas, '80 - actor
- Todd Susman ‘65 - actor
- Courtney Van Buren '98 - football player
- Justin Willman '98 - actor, magician and entertainer
