= Westminster Christian Academy (Missouri) =

Private school in Town and Country, MO

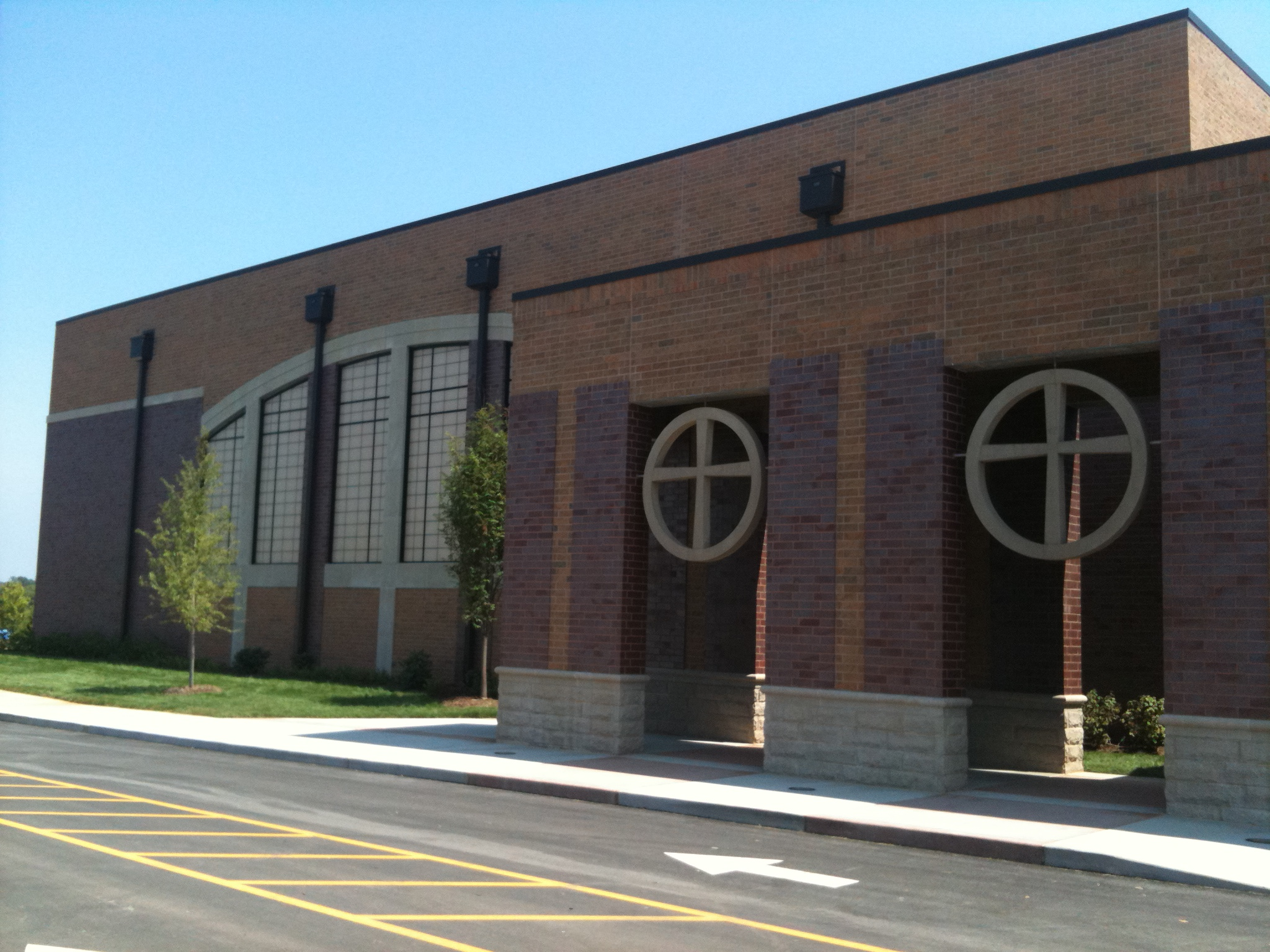
- Main entrance

Location
- 800 Maryville Centre Drive; Town and Country, Missouri 63017; United States; 38°38′13″N 90°30′13″W

Information
- Type: Private high school
- Religious affiliation: Christian
- Established: 1976; 50 years ago
- CEEB code: 263121
- Head of School: Barrett Mosbacker
- Grades: 7–12
- Gender: Coeducational
- Enrollment: 970 (2025–26)
- Colors: Blue and white
- Athletics conference: Metro League
- Nickname: Wildcats
- Accreditation: Cognia
- Website: wcastl.org

Westminster Christian Academy (WCA) is a private, coeducational Christian school in Town and Country, Missouri, serving students in grades 7–12. As of 2025, it had an enrollment of 970 students. Founded in 1976, the school moved to its present campus in 2011.

== History ==
Founded by members of the reformed Presbyterian church, Westminster Christian Academy opened in 1976 in rented classrooms at Missouri Baptist University, with 72 students. It soon moved to a former elementary school in Des Peres, then in 1982, when enrollment had grown to 250, bought the 30-acre former Ladue Middle School campus on Ladue Road in Creve Coeur.

The Ladue Road campus, which originally had a capacity of 600, was renovated and expanded in the early 1990s to accommodate 900 students, and enrollment subsequently grew. In 2003, Westminster purchased the 40-acre campus of West County Vocational Technical School in Town and Country, intending to use it to accommodate future growth. An anonymous gift enabled it to purchase the adjacent 30 acres, known as "Centreat", from Central Presbyterian Church. Ground was broken in June 2010 on extensive modifications and additions to the technical school building, and when the school reopened on its new campus in August 2011, it had a capacity of 1,200 students and 300,000 sq. ft. of educational space, including a 610-seat theater, plus extensive athletic facilities. The former campus, then with 165,000 sq. ft. of space, was sold to the Ladue School District.

=== Leadership ===
The following have served as head of school: Nolan Vander Ark (1976–77); Evelyn Downs (1977–81); Arlen Dykstra (1981–84); Larry Birchler (acting headmaster 1984–85); Jim Marsh (1985–2013); Dr. Tom Stoner (2013–2016); Todd Fuller, Tim Hall, and Scott Holley (joint-interim heads of school 2016–2017); Dr. Barrett Mosbacker (2017–present).

== Programs ==
=== Academics ===
During the 1990–91 school year, Westminster was recognized as a Blue Ribbon School by the United States Department of Education. The school is recognized for combining Christian education with high academic standards.

In August 2025, Westminster launched its fully-equipped coral lab operating under a Scientific Research Marine Special Activities License from the Florida Fish and Wildlife Commission to 3-D scan Atlantic stony coral to monitor growth rates. The lab was built in partnership with SeaScapes Studios, the St. Louis Aquarium, and Plant a Million Corals. Westminster is one of approximately 30 institutes licensed to store and maintain Atlantic stony coral genetic broodstock.

=== Arts ===
Westminster has received 58 St. Louis High School Musical Theatre Awards nominations, winning 15 awards. Awards won include Outstanding Production (2017, 2019, 2020, 2022, 2025), Outstanding Ensemble (2019, 2024), Outstanding Costume Design & Execution (2018, 2025), Outstanding Direction (2018), Outstanding Supporting Actress (2017), Outstanding Lead Actor (2020), and Outstanding Lead Actress (2022). In August 2025, Westminster's upper school orchestra was selected to perform at the Missouri Music Educators Association's annual conference, becoming the first private school ever selected for this achievement.

=== Athletics ===
Westminster teams are the Wildcats. The school is a member of the Metro League along with John Burroughs, Lutheran North, Lutheran South, MICDS, Principia, Priory, and Whitfield.

Westminster's athletic program has won many state titles, including 15 state championships and 33 individual state championships. Varsity football started in 2001; the team has since won five district championships and two conference championships and reached the state final four for the first time in 2015. In 2010, the boys' golf team won Westminster's first state championship. In 2014, the boys' baseball team became the first in Missouri history to win four consecutive state championships (2011, 2012, 2013, 2014). The boys' hockey team won the Wickenheiser Cup in 2017 and 2018. In 2022, the girls' volleyball team won their second straight state championship. In March 2023, the girls' swim team won the state championship for the first time. Margo O'Meara was the first girl and the second student to win four consecutive Missouri state diving championships. In December 2023, the boys' soccer team won its first-ever state championship.

Westminster's student athletes have won several awards. Four athletes—Jacob Turner (2009) and Jake Matheny (2016) in baseball, Kirsten Davis (2017) in soccer, and Daniel Everett (2011) in track and field—have been named Missouri Gatorade Player of the Year. In 2015, Zach Hughes won the Wendy's High School Heisman award.

== Accreditation and memberships ==
=== Accreditation ===
Westminster has been accredited since 1983 by the Independent Schools Association of the Central States, the first Christian school to achieve that accreditation, and by Cognia.

=== Memberships ===
Westminster became a member of the National Union of Christian Schools in its first year. It is currently a member of the following organizations: the Council on Educational Standards & Accountability (CESA) and the Christian Schools Association of St. Louis.

== Notable alumni ==
- Michael Gerson (1982) — former presidential speechwriter for President George W. Bush and one of Time magazine's "25 Most Influential Evangelicals In America"
- Jean Evans (1983) — former member of the Missouri House of Representatives from the 99th district
- Michael Miller (1990) — WORLD Magazine's 2019 Daniel of the Year
- Sandra McCracken (1995) — Grammy-nominated and Dove Award-winning singer-songwriter
- Liz Forkin Bohannon (2004) — founder of Sseko Designs and one of Forbes magazine's top 10 public speakers
- Jacob Turner (2009) — former MLB pitcher for the Detroit Tigers, Miami Marlins, Chicago Cubs, Chicago White Sox, and Washington Nationals
- Kirsten Wright (2017) — former NWSL forward for Racing Louisville FC
