= Ladue, Missouri =

Ladue
- City
- City of Ladue, Missouri
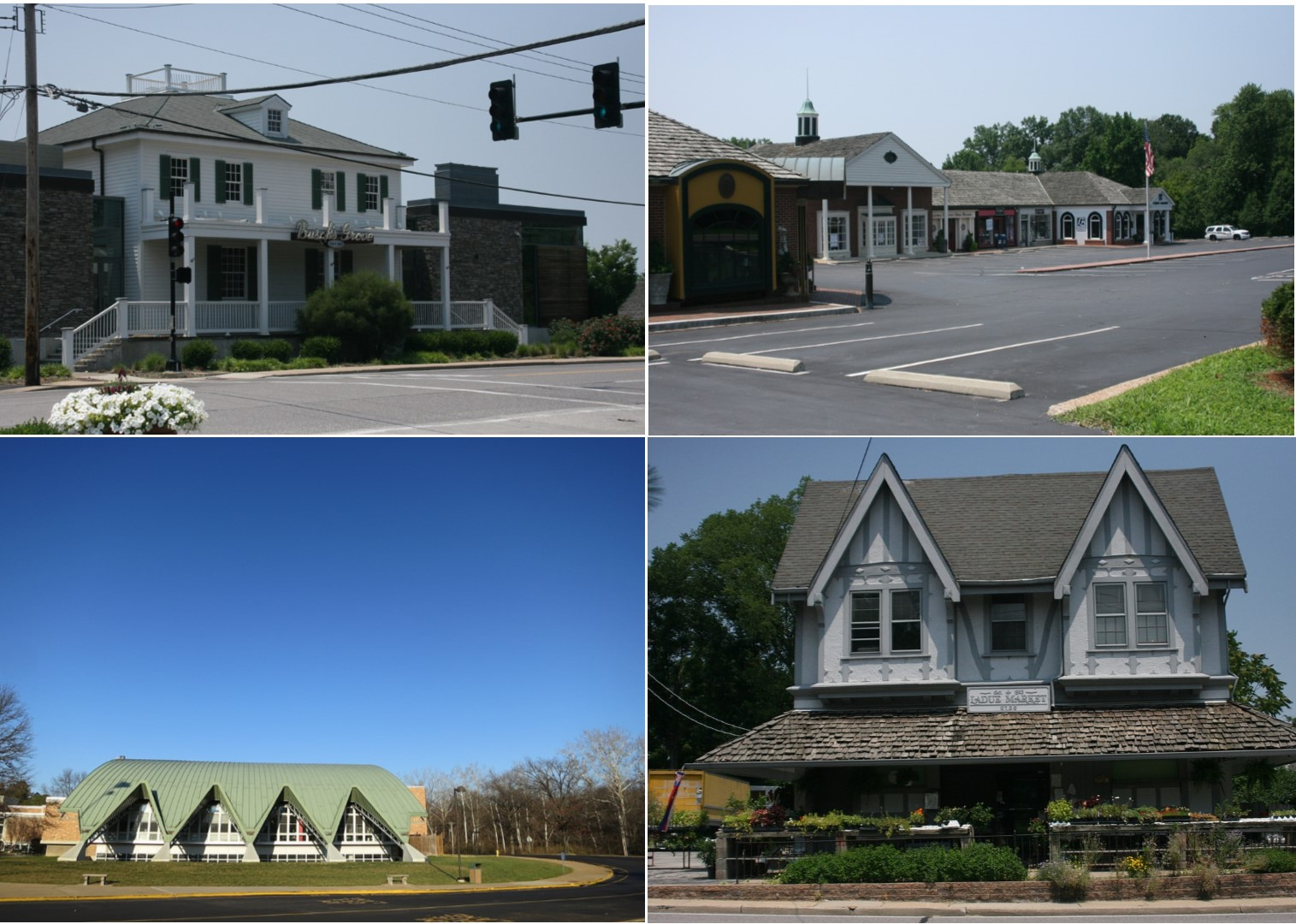
- From top left: Busch's Grove, strip mall, Ladue Middle School, Ladue Market

- Location of Ladue, Missouri

- Location within Missouri Location within the United States
- Coordinates: 38°38′16″N 90°22′53″W
- Country: United States
- State: Missouri
- County: St. Louis
- Incorporated: 1936

Government
  - Mayor: Nancy Spewak

Area
  - Total: 8.57 sq mi (22.19 km^{2})
  - Land: 8.56 sq mi (22.17 km^{2})
  - Water: 0.0077 sq mi (0.02 km^{2})
- Elevation: 561 ft (171 m)

Population (2020)
  - Total: 8,989
  - Density: 1,050.1/sq mi (405.46/km^{2})
- Time zone: UTC-6 (Central (CST))
  - Summer (DST): UTC-5 (CST)
- ZIP Code: 63124
- Area code: 314
- FIPS code: 29-39656
- GNIS feature ID: 2395582
- Website: http://www.cityofladue-mo.gov

Ladue (/lɑːˈduː/ lah-DOO) is an inner-ring suburb of St. Louis, located in St. Louis County, Missouri. As of the 2020 census, the city had a population of 8,989.

Ladue has the highest median household income of any city in Missouri with a population over 1,000.

== Geography ==
According to the United States Census Bureau, the city has a total area of 8.55 square miles (22.14 km^{2}), all land.

Tilles Park is a large park within Ladue.

== Demographics ==
Historical population
Census	Pop.	Note	%±
1940	3,981		—
1950	5,386		35.3%
1960	9,466		75.8%
1970	10,306		8.9%
1980	9,369		−9.1%
1990	8,847		−5.6%
2000	8,645		−2.3%
2010	8,521		−1.4%
2020	8,989		5.5%
U.S. Decennial Census

=== Racial and ethnic composition ===
Ladue city, Missouri – Racial and ethnic composition Note: the US Census treats Hispanic/Latino as an ethnic category. This table excludes Latinos from the racial categories and assigns them to a separate category. Hispanics/Latinos may be of any race.
Race / Ethnicity (NH = Non-Hispanic)	Pop 2000	Pop 2010	Pop 2020	% 2000	% 2010	% 2020
White alone (NH)	8,312	7,925	7,748	96.15%	93.01%	86.19%
Black or African American alone (NH)	76	83	101	0.88%	0.97%	1.12%
Native American or Alaska Native alone (NH)	8	7	8	0.09%	0.08%	0.09%
Asian alone (NH)	129	261	510	1.49%	3.06%	5.67%
Native Hawaiian or Pacific Islander alone (NH)	10	8	0	0.12%	0.09%	0.00%
Other race alone (NH)	10	9	29	0.12%	0.11%	0.32%
Mixed race or Multiracial (NH)	33	108	378	0.38%	1.27%	4.21%
Hispanic or Latino (any race)	67	120	215	0.78%	1.41%	2.39%
Total	8,645	8,521	8,989	100.00%	100.00%	100.00%

=== 2020 census ===
As of the 2020 census, Ladue had a population of 8,989. The median age was 45.4 years. 26.9% of residents were under the age of 18 and 20.9% of residents were 65 years of age or older. For every 100 females there were 94.4 males, and for every 100 females age 18 and over there were 90.4 males age 18 and over.

100.0% of residents lived in urban areas, while 0.0% lived in rural areas.

There were 3,189 households in Ladue, of which 39.2% had children under the age of 18 living in them. Of all households, 73.0% were married-couple households, 8.1% were households with a male householder and no spouse or partner present, and 16.6% were households with a female householder and no spouse or partner present. About 16.7% of all households were made up of individuals and 11.0% had someone living alone who was 65 years of age or older. The city had 2,736 families, and the average household and family sizes were 2.6 and 2.9, respectively.

There were 3,375 housing units, of which 5.5% were vacant. The homeowner vacancy rate was 0.8% and the rental vacancy rate was 10.8%. The population density was 1,050.1 per square mile (405.5/km^{2}).

=== Income and poverty ===
The 2016–2020 five-year American Community Survey estimates show that the median household income was $242,792 and the median family income was more than $250,000. Males had a median income of $147,188 (+/- $60,354) versus $65,449 (+/- $11,016) for females. The median income for those above 16 years old was $103,000 (+/- $18,859). About 2.3% of the families and 1.9% of the population were below the poverty line, including 1.7% of those under 18 and 3.1% of those 65 or over.

=== 2010 census ===
As of the 2010 census, 8,521 people, 3,169 households, and 2,538 families were residing in the city. The population density was 996.6 inhabitants per square mile (384.8/km^{2}). The 3,377 housing units had an average density of 395.0 per square mile (152.5/km^{2}). The racial makeup of the city was 94.1% White, 1.0% African American, 0.1% Native American, 3.1% Asian, 0.1% Pacific Islander, 0.3% from other races, and 1.4% from two or more races. Hispanics or Latinos of any race were 1.4% of the population.

Of the 3,169 households, 36.6% had children under 18 living with them, 72.6% were married couples living together, 5.6% had a female householder with no husband present, 1.9% had a male householder with no wife present, and 19.9% were not families. About 18.3% of all households were made up of individuals, and 10.3% had someone living alone who was 65 or older. The average household size was 2.69 and the average family size was 3.06. The median age in the city was 46.4 years. The age distribution was 27.4% under 18, 4.3% from 18 to 24, 16.1% from 25 to 44, 33.7% from 45 to 64, and 18.6% were 65 or older. The gender makeup of the city was 48.5% male and 51.5% female.

=== 2000 census ===
As of the 2000 census, 8,645 people, 3,414 households, and 2,598 families were living in the city. The population density was 1,006.2 inhabitants per square mile (388.5/km^{2}). The 3,557 housing units had an average density of 414.0 per square mile (159.8/km^{2}). The racial makeup of the city was 96.83% White, 0.88% African American, 0.10% Native American, 1.49% Asian, 0.12% Pacific Islander, 0.13% from other races, and 0.45% from two or more races. Hispanics or Latinos of any race were 0.78% of the population.

Of the 3,414 households, 31.4% had children under 18 living with them, 70.6% were married couples living together, 4.0% had a female householder with no husband present, and 23.9% were not families. About 22.8% of all households were made up of individuals, and 14.4% had someone living alone who was 65 or older. The average household size was 2.51 and the average family size was 2.94. In the city, the age distribution was 24.5% under 18, 3.5% from 18 to 24, 16.9% from 25 to 44, 32.2% from 45 to 64, and 22.8% who were 65 or older. The median age was 48 years. For every 100 females, there were 91.2 males. For every 100 females 18 and over, there were 88.4 males.

The median income for a household in the city was $141,720, and for a family was $179,328. Males had a median income of $100,000 versus $51,678 for females. The per capita income for the city was $89,623. About 1.4% of families and 2.1% of the population were below the poverty line, including 2.0% of those under age 18 and 2.4% of those age 65 or over.

== Education ==
The Ladue School District serves all of Ladue, Olivette, Frontenac, and part of Town and Country and Creve Coeur. The Ladue School District is home to the Ladue Early Childhood Center, four elementary schools (Conway, Old Bonhomme, Reed, and Spoede), Ladue Fifth Grade Center, Ladue Middle School, and Ladue Horton Watkins High School. As of the 2015–2016 academic year, Ladue High School had an enrollment of 1,301 students.

Ladue is home to two of St. Louis' private high schools, the John Burroughs School and Mary Institute and St. Louis Country Day School (MICDS), as well as Community School for prekindergarten to grade six.

The Headquarters Branch of the St. Louis County Library is located in Ladue on Lindbergh Boulevard (US 67).

== History ==
The historical anecdotes contained in this section were derived from the 2011 book Ladue Found, written by Charlene Bry, former editor and owner of The Ladue News.

Ladue began as a farming community and St. Louis County suburb. After St. Louis City ejected St. Louis County in 1876, Ladue was known as ranges 4 and 5 of "Township 45", with Clayton being the political hub. Original Township 45 farming families included the Dennys, Dwyers, Conways, McCutcheons, McKnights (all Irish), Litzsinger, von Schraders, Spoedes, Luedloffs, Muellers, Seiberts (all German), LaDues (French), Warsons, Lays, Barnes, Prices, and Watsons (all English), according to a 1868 Pitzman map of St. Louis, as well as 1878 and 1909 maps of St. Louis County.

Once automobiles replaced horses and wagons as the primary mode of transportation, farmers in the area began selling portions of their land to city workers who wished to live outside of the urban setting. Three small villages (Village of LaDue, Village of Deer Creek, and the Village of McKnight) merged in 1936 to become what is now known as Ladue. Ladue was named from Ladue Road, the main thoroughfare in the area that led from St. Louis city to wealthy entrepreneur Peter Albert LaDue's large property at the current intersection of Warson Road and Ladue Road (including St. Louis Country Club). Peter Albert LaDue was born in Kinderhook, New York, in 1821, a descendant of Pierre LaDoux, who arrived from France in the 1600s. He arrived in Saint Louis about 1848 and later became a prominent attorney, alderman, banker, and land speculator.

== Controversies ==
In 1986, the City of Ladue sued residents E. Terrence Jones and Joan Kelly Horn for living together without being married. Ladue officials had ordered them to marry or leave their home. The Missouri Court of Appeals sided with the city, stating in City of Ladue v. Horn, "A man and woman living together, sharing pleasures and certain responsibilities, does not per se constitute a family in even the conceptual sense....There is no doubt that there is a governmental interest in marriage and in preserving the integrity of the biological or legal family. There is no concomitant governmental interest in keeping together a group of unrelated persons, no matter how closely they simulate a family. Further, there is no state policy which commands that groups of people may live under the same roof in any section of a municipality they choose." But lawmakers had the last word. Under Chapter 213 of the Missouri Human Rights Act (§213.040.1), passed after the Ladue v. Horn case, housing discrimination on the basis of familial status is illegal.

In the early 1990s, the city tried to force a resident to take down a yard sign that said, "Say No to the War in the Persian Gulf, Call Congress Now" as it violated a city law. The ACLU sued, arguing that the right to place the sign was protected by the right to free speech enshrined in the First Amendment. The ensuing legal battle went to the United States Supreme Court, which unanimously ruled, in City of Ladue v. Gilleo, that the right to place the sign was protected by the Constitution.

In 2010, the former chief of police, Larry White, sued the City of Ladue for wrongful termination. The suit was dismissed by the Circuit Court of St. Louis County in 2012, and the dismissal was upheld by the Missouri Court of Appeals in 2013.

In 2014, Black drivers in Ladue were 16 times more likely than white drivers to be pulled over by the Ladue Police Department. An annual report by the Missouri attorney general's office found that of the 4,107 traffic stops that year, 575 (14% percent), were of Black drivers, who comprised just 0.88% of the city's population.

== Notable people ==
- Chuck Berry, musician
- Joe Buck, play-by-play broadcaster
- Michelle Beisner-Buck, sports broadcaster, journalist, actor, former Denver Broncos cheerleader
- August Busch III, former chairman of Anheuser-Busch
- William H. T. Bush, brother of President George H. W. Bush
- Maxine Clark, founder and CEO of Build-A-Bear Workshop
- John Danforth, U.S. Senator from Missouri
- William Henry Danforth, MD, former chancellor of Washington University in St. Louis
- William DeWitt, Jr., chairman of the St. Louis Cardinals
- Ezekiel Elliott, running back for the Dallas Cowboys
- David Farr, chairman and CEO of Emerson Electric Company
- Charles F. Knight, former chairman of Emerson Electric Co.
- Albert Bond Lambert, Olympic golfer and founder of Lambert-St. Louis International Airport
- James Smith McDonnell, founder of McDonnell Douglas (now Boeing)
- Gene McNary, former St Louis County executive and former commissioner of the U.S. Immigration and Naturalization Service
- Stan Musial, Hall of Fame Major League Baseball player
- Gyo Obata, founder of HOK Architecture
- William B. Robertson, owner of Robertson Aircraft Corporation
- Phyllis Schlafly, conservative activist and founder of Eagle Forum
- Lt. Roz Schulte (1984–2009), National Intelligence Medal of Valor recipient and first female U.S. Air Force Academy graduate killed by enemy combatants in the U.S. War on Terrorism in Afghanistan
- Andrew C. Taylor, CEO and chairman of Enterprise Rent-A-Car and Enterprise Holdings
- George Herbert Walker, founder of G. H. Walker & Co.
- George Howard Williams, former U.S. Senator
- Jay Williamson, PGA golfer
