= Town and Country, Missouri =

- City
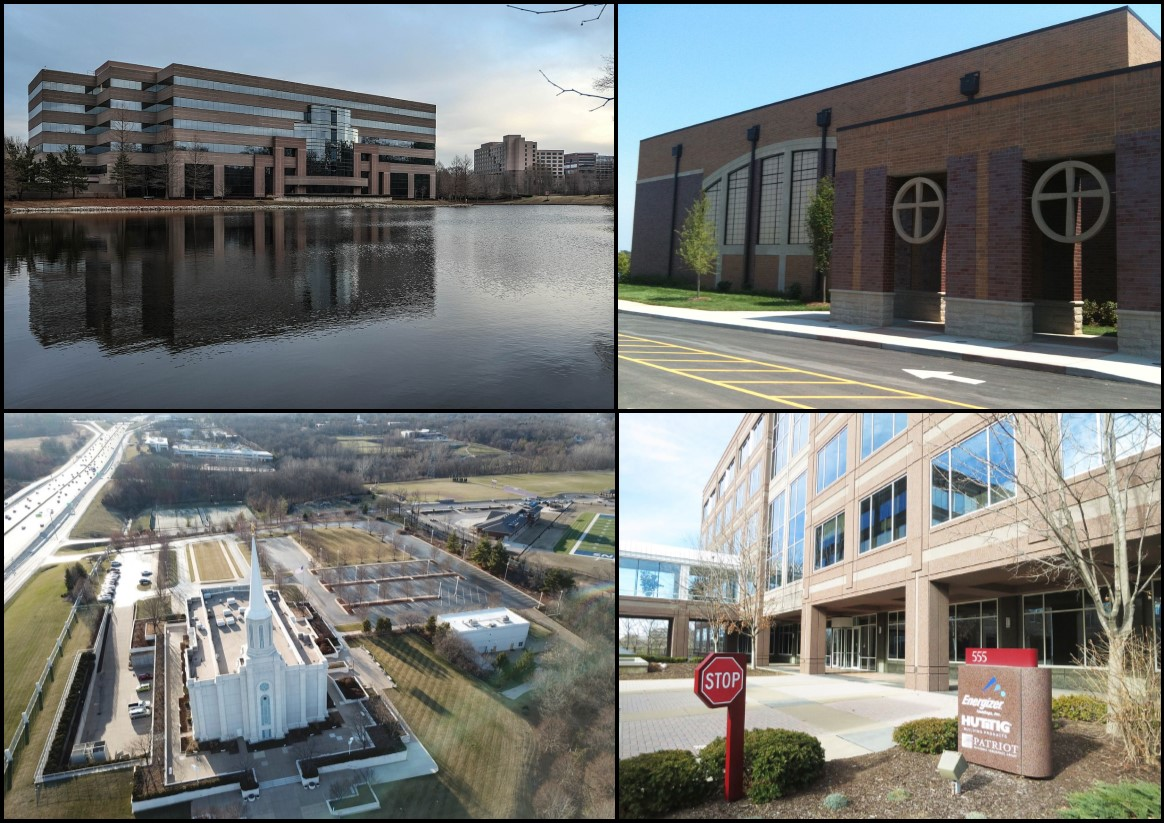
- From top left, left to right: Office building, Westminster Christian Academy, St. Louis Missouri Temple, Energizer Holdings headquarters

- Location of Town and Country, Missouri
- Coordinates: 38°37′54″N 90°28′45″W
- Country: United States
- State: Missouri
- County: St. Louis
- Incorporated: 1975 (city)

Government
  - Type: Mayor–board of aldermen–city administrator
  - Mayor: Charles Rehm Jr.

Area
  - Total: 11.53 sq mi (29.86 km^{2})
  - Land: 11.49 sq mi (29.76 km^{2})
  - Water: 0.035 sq mi (0.09 km^{2})
- Elevation: 607 ft (185 m)

Population (2020)
  - Total: 11,640
  - Density: 1,013.0/sq mi (391.11/km^{2})
- Time zone: UTC-6 (Central (CST))
  - Summer (DST): UTC-5 (CDT)
- ZIP Code: 63131, 63017
- Area code: 314
- FIPS code: 29-73618
- GNIS feature ID: 2397043
- Website: www.town-and-country.org

Town and Country is a city in west St. Louis County, Missouri, United States with a population of 11,640 as of the 2020 census.

Town and Country has the highest median household income ($134,387 in 2009) of any city in Missouri with a population over 10,000 and also has one of the highest median incomes of any city in the United States. The city is included in the St. Louis, MO-IL Metropolitan Statistical Area, and is home to Bellerive Country Club, which hosted the 1965 U.S. Open, the 1992 PGA Championship, and the 2018 PGA Championship.

== Geography ==
According to the United States Census Bureau, the city has a total area of 11.68 square miles (30.25 km^{2}), all land.

The village of Country Life Acres is an enclave entirely surrounded by Town and Country.

== History ==
As early as 1886, Town and Country was a farming town known as Altheim. In 1950, Town and Country was incorporated as a village, and re-incorporated as a fourth-class city 25 years later.

== Demographics ==
Historical population
Census	Pop.	Note	%±
1950	162		—
1960	1,440		788.9%
1970	2,645		83.7%
1980	3,187		20.5%
1990	9,519		198.7%
2000	10,894		14.4%
2010	10,815		−0.7%
2020	11,640		7.6%
U.S. Decennial Census 2020

=== Racial and ethnic composition ===
Town and Country city, Missouri – Racial and ethnic composition Note: the US Census treats Hispanic/Latino as an ethnic category. This table excludes Latinos from the racial categories and assigns them to a separate category. Hispanics/Latinos may be of any race.
Race / Ethnicity (NH = Non-Hispanic)	Pop 2000	Pop 2010	Pop 2020	% 2000	% 2010	% 2020
White alone (NH)	9,738	9,350	8,862	89.39%	86.45%	76.13%
Black or African American alone (NH)	218	276	300	2.00%	2.55%	2.58%
Native American or Alaska Native alone (NH)	4	12	6	0.04%	0.11%	0.05%
Asian alone (NH)	687	809	1,262	6.31%	7.48%	10.84%
Native Hawaiian or Pacific Islander alone (NH)	1	10	3	0.01%	0.09%	0.03%
Other race alone (NH)	5	18	54	0.05%	0.17%	0.46%
Mixed race or Multiracial (NH)	124	151	391	1.14%	1.40%	3.36%
Hispanic or Latino (any race)	117	189	762	1.07%	1.75%	6.55%
Total	10,894	10,815	11,640	100.00%	100.00%	100.00%

=== 2020 census ===
As of the 2020 census, Town and Country had a population of 11,640, with 3,609 households and 3,333 families.

The population density was 1,013.1 inhabitants per square mile (391.2/km^{2}). There were 3,842 housing units, of which 6.1% were vacant. The homeowner vacancy rate was 1.3% and the rental vacancy rate was 14.8%.

Of households, 30.8% had children under the age of 18. Married-couple households were 74.4%, while 7.5% had a male householder with no spouse or partner present and 15.8% had a female householder with no spouse or partner present. Individuals made up 16.4% of all households, and 10.7% had someone living alone who was 65 years of age or older. The average household size was 2.5 and the average family size was 2.8.

The median age was 47.5 years. 19.5% of residents were under the age of 18 and 26.2% were 65 years of age or older. For every 100 females there were 89.8 males, and for every 100 females age 18 and over there were 86.2 males.

100.0% of residents lived in urban areas, while 0.0% lived in rural areas.

=== Income and poverty ===
The 2016–2020 5-year American Community Survey estimates show that the median household income was $202,974 (with a margin of error of +/- $43,042) and the median family income was $250,000+ (+/- $**). Males had a median income of $186,875 (+/- $75,422) versus $42,983 (+/- $16,685) for females. The median income for those above 16 years old was $96,925 (+/- $24,776). Approximately, 2.6% of families and 4.3% of the population were below the poverty line, including 4.1% of those under the age of 18 and 3.5% of those ages 65 or over.

=== 2010 census ===
At the 2010 census there were 10,815 people, 3,591 households, and 2,798 families living in the city. The population density was 925.9 inhabitants per square mile (357.5/km^{2}). There were 3,871 housing units at an average density of 331.4 per square mile (128.0/km^{2}). The racial makeup of the city was 87.8% White, 2.6% African American, 0.1% Native American, 7.5% Asian, 0.1% Pacific Islander, 0.4% from other races, and 1.6% from two or more races. Hispanic or Latino of any race were 1.7%.

Of the 3,591 households 30.6% had children under the age of 18 living with them, 72.2% were married couples living together, 4.0% had a female householder with no husband present, 1.8% had a male householder with no wife present, and 22.1% were non-families. 17.9% of households were one person and 9.9% were one person aged 65 or older. The average household size was 2.66 and the average family size was 3.02.

The median age was 48.6 years. 21.9% of residents were under the age of 18; 10.1% were between the ages of 18 and 24; 12.3% were from 25 to 44; 32.4% were from 45 to 64; and 23.1% were 65 or older. The gender makeup of the city was 46.5% male and 53.5% female.

=== 2000 census ===
At the 2000 census there were 10,894 people, 3,593 households, and 2,849 families living in the city. The population density was 916.8 inhabitants per square mile (354.0/km^{2}). There were 3,741 housing units at an average density of 314.8 per square mile (121.5/km^{2}). The racial makeup of the city was 90.16% White, 2.01% African American, 0.06% Native American, 6.33% Asian, 0.01% Pacific Islander, 0.23% from other races, and 1.20% from two or more races. Hispanic or Latino of any race were 1.07%.

Of the 3,593 households 33.6% had children under the age of 18 living with them, 74.0% were married couples living together, 4.1% had a female householder with no husband present, and 20.7% were non-families. 18.7% of households were one person and 10.6% were one person aged 65 or older. The average household size was 2.69 and the average family size was 3.08.

The age distribution was 22.8% under the age of 18, 7.3% from 18 to 24, 16.9% from 25 to 44, 31.1% from 45 to 64, and 21.8% 65 or older. The median age was 47 years. For every 100 females, there were 87.7 males. For every 100 females age 18 and over, there were 81.5 males.

The median household income was $139,967 and the median family income was $167,875. Males had a median income of $100,000 versus $41,691 for females. The per capita income for the city was $69,347.

== Architecture ==
The Theodore A. Pappas House, designed by Frank Lloyd Wright in the Usonian style, is located in Town and Country.

== Economy ==
Town and Country is home to Missouri Baptist Medical Center, which is part of Barnes Jewish Christian Healthcare (BJC).

Lion's Choice is headquartered in Town and Country.

== Education ==
The public school district for most of Town and Country is the Parkway C-2 School District. Parkway operates Mason Ridge Elementary School in Town and Country. Other portions are in the Kirkwood R-VII School District and the Ladue School District.

Special School District of St. Louis County, a county-wide school district for disabled children, has its administrative offices and Neuwoehner High School in Town and Country.

Private schools:

- The Principia is a private school for Christian Scientists located on a 360-acre (150 ha) campus in Town and Country.
- Visitation Academy of St. Louis, a Catholic private all-girls school, is also located in Town and Country.
- All-boys Catholic high school Christian Brothers College High School is located on the North Forty Outer Road.
- In 2011, Westminster Christian Academy relocated to a new campus off Maryville Centre Drive.

Tertiary facilities in Town and Country:

- Maryville University is located in Town and Country.

== Parks and Recreation ==
The West Clubhouse of the Missouri Athletic Club is located in Town and Country.

== Notable people ==
- Bob Costas, NBC sports commentator
- Dan Dierdorf, NFL Hall of Famer
- Paul Goldschmidt, Major League Baseball first baseman
- Torry Holt, St. Louis Rams wide receiver
- Rodger O. Riney, Scottrade CEO
- Michael Roarty, Anheuser Busch marketing executive, created "This Bud's for you" slogan
- D. John Sauer, Solicitor General of the United States
- Red Schoendienst, Major League Baseball Hall of Famer, home
- Ozzie Smith, Major League Baseball Hall of Famer
- Patrick Stokes, Anheuser Busch chairman
- Todd Worrell, former Major League Baseball pitcher and 1986 National League Rookie of the Year
