= Ladue School District =

School district in Missouri, United States

Coordinates: 38°38′26″N 90°23′10″W

Address
- 9703 Conway Road St. Louis, Missouri, 63124; United States

District information
- Type: Public
- Grades: PreK–12
- NCES District ID: 2917820

Students and staff
- Students: 4,325
- Teachers: 331.5
- Staff: 176.9
- Student–teacher ratio: 13.05

Other information
- Website: www.ladueschools.net

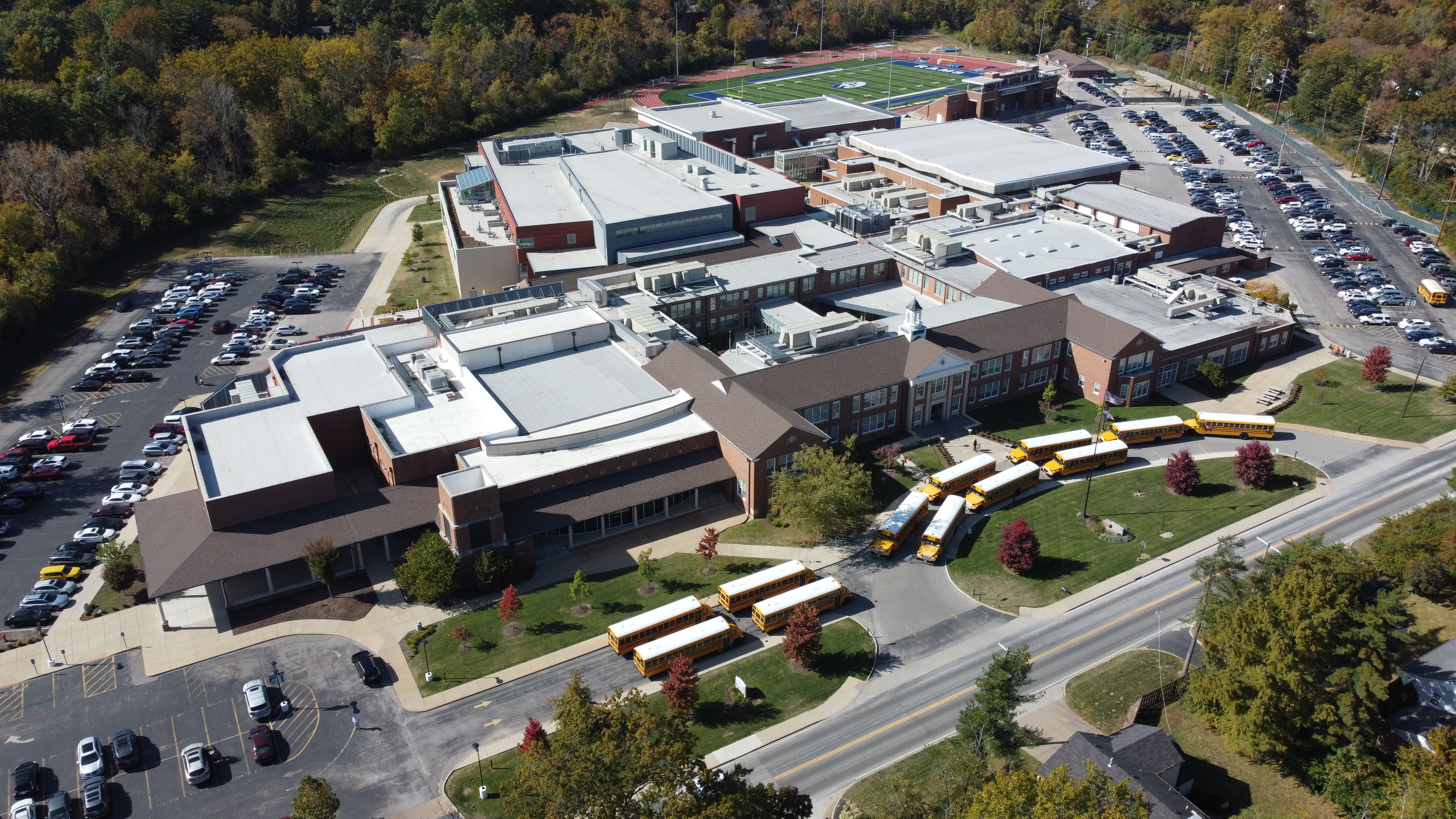

The Ladue School District is a public school district in Ladue, Missouri, with four elementary, one middle, and one high school, with a special Fifth Grade Center. The district serves 4,180 total students, and employs 280 full-time classroom teachers. As one of the top districts in the nation, the district houses a talented student base who excel academically, including in Science Olympiad events and VEX Robotics. The total operating revenue is $49.9 mil. with $50.2 mil. operating expenses. Ladue spends $11,903 per student, and pays an average of $62,697 per teacher ($41,000-$101,542). According to Newsweek (June 19, 2011 issue), Ladue ranks in the top 2% of public schools in the nation.

== Boundary ==
The Ladue School District serves an area encompassing 19 sq. mi. with more than 27,000 residents. It is completely inclusive to the municipalities of Ladue and Crystal Lake Park; and partially inclusive to Creve Coeur, Frontenac, Huntleigh, Olivette, Richmond Heights, Town and Country, Unincorporated St. Louis County and Westwood.

== History ==
As the City of Ladue was incorporated in 1936, Spoede Elementary and Ross Elementary were built in the 1930s. The Ladue School District was first organized in 1939.

In U.S. v Ladue School District, a case the U.S. Department of Justice brought in 1978, the federal government charged Ladue with discrimination in hiring of faculty and staff. In 1999, Ladue exited the Voluntary Interdistrict Choice Corporation (VICC), a city-county school desegregation program.

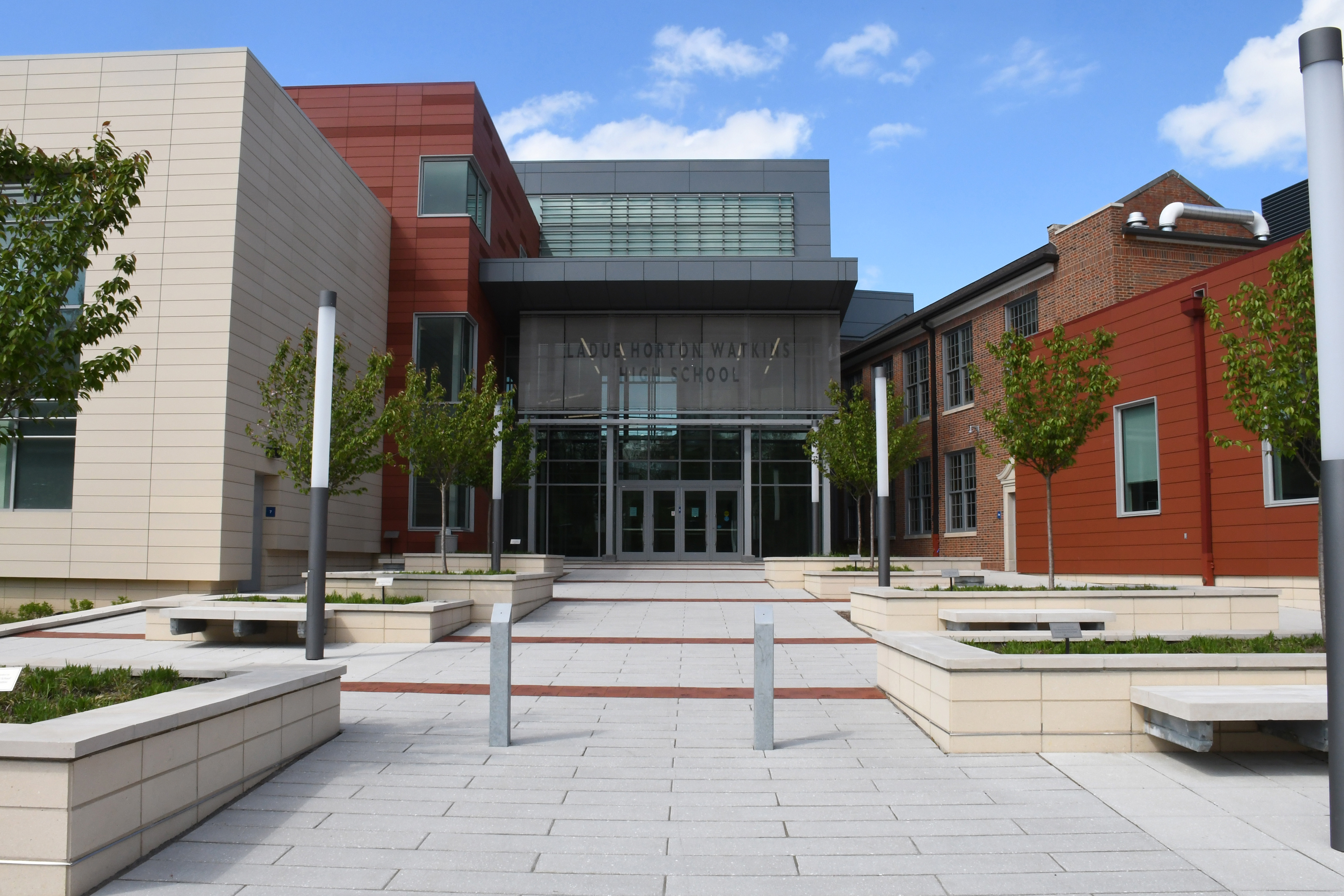
Ladue Horton Watkins High School Jahnke Entrance

== Ladue Horton Watkins High School ==
Ladue Horton Watkins High School had 1,306 students in the 2013–14 school year. Ladue Horton Watkins High School has a 99% graduation rate, of which 92% continue on to higher education in 2-4 year institutions. In standardized testing, Ladue scores above both the state and national average. Newsweek in 2013, ranked the public school 166th best in the nation (up from 188th in 2011–12), and first in Missouri (up from fourth).

=== Administration ===
- Superintendent: Dr. Jim Wipke
- Principal: Brad Griffith (effective July 1, 2013)

== Ladue Middle School ==
Originally called "East Ladue Junior High School," Ladue Middle School teaches children from sixth through eighth grades, total of 976 students in 2013–14. In May 2014 it was named National School of Character.

=== Ladue Fifth Grade Center ===
Built on property bought by the district in 1959 and used as a secondary middle school until 1980, when it was sold to the Westminster Christian Academy. In 2010, the property was re-purchased by the district to construct the Fifth Grade Center. Construction ended in time for its first semester in Fall 2013. In the 2015–2016 school year, there were 342 students enrolled.

== Elementary schools ==
All four Ladue Elementary Schools teach children in kindergarten through fourth grades.

=== Conway Elementary ===
Conway Elementary is located in Ladue, MO, at 9900 Conway Road. In 2013–14 Conway Elementary had 339 students. This school has the smallest number of students throughout the district. Conway enrolled its first black students in 1965.

=== Old Bonhomme Elementary ===
Old Bonhomme School is an elementary school in Olivette, Missouri, with a total of 383 students in 2013–14.

=== Reed Elementary ===
Located in the middle of Ladue near the intersection of Ladue Road and McKnight Road, with a total of 421 students in 2013–14.

=== Spoede Elementary ===
Spoede Elementary is located in Creve Coeur, on the west side of Spoede Road, with a total of 430 students in 2013–14. This school's mascot is a turtle.
