= Poplar Bluff Township, Butler County, Missouri =

Township in the US state of Missouri

Poplar Bluff Township
- Township
- Coordinates: 36°45′31″N 090°23′51″W
- Country: United States
- State: Missouri
- County: Butler

Area
  - Total: 138.92 sq mi (359.81 km^{2})
  - Land: 138.70 sq mi (359.24 km^{2})
  - Water: 0.22 sq mi (0.57 km^{2}) 0.16%
- Elevation: 325 ft (99 m)

Population (2010)
  - Total: 25,878
  - Density: 180/sq mi (69.4/km^{2})
- FIPS code: 29-59114
- GNIS feature ID: 0766356

Poplar Bluff Township is one of ten townships in Butler County, Missouri, USA. As of the 2010 census, its population was 25,878.

== Geography ==
Poplar Bluff Township covers an area of 138.92 square miles (359.8 km^{2}) and contains one incorporated settlement, Poplar Bluff (the county seat). It contains seventeen cemeteries: Ashcraft, Black Creek, Carpenter Bend, Dooley, Friendship, Green Hill, Hvam, Marble Hill, Melton, Memorial Gardens, Morocco, Oak Hill, Podesva, Sacred Heart, Shadle, Sheppard and Woodlawn.

Carpenter Lake is within this township. The streams of Agee Creek, Black Creek, Black River, Buck Creek, Dobbs Creek, Harwell Creek, Hickory Creek, Hoedapp Creek, Indian Creek, Lewis Creek, Mill Creek, Pike Creek and Pike Slough run through this township.

== Transportation ==
Poplar Bluff Township contains three airports or landing strips: Earl Fields Memorial Airport, Hayes Field and Lucy Lee Hospital Heliport.
