= Missouri Route 142 =

State highway in Missouri, U.S.

Route 142
- MO 142 highlighted in red

Route information
- Maintained by MoDOT
- Length: 122.328 mi (196.868 km)

Major junctions
- East end: Route 53 in Poplar Bluff
- US 63 in Thayer; US 160 in Doniphan; US 67 in Neelyville
- West end: Route 101 in Bakersfield

Location
- Country: United States
- State: Missouri

Highway system
- Missouri State Highway System; Interstate; US; State; Supplemental
← Route 141	→ Route 143

Route 142 is a highway in southern Missouri. Its eastern terminus is at Route 53 in southern Poplar Bluff; its western terminus is at Route 101 in Bakersfield. Route 142 is the southernmost east–west highway in the south-central part of the state. Despite its length, there are relatively few towns on the route.

== Major intersections ==
County	Location	mi	km	Destinations	Notes
Ozark	Bakersfield	0.000	0.000	Route 101	
Ozark	Bakersfield	0.040	0.064	Route AR to AR 87	
Howell	Lanton	20.811	33.492	Route 17 – Arkansas state line, West Plains	
Oregon	Thayer	36.010	57.952	US 63 Bus. north	Western end of US 63 Business overlap
Oregon	Thayer	36.472	58.696	US 63 south – Mammoth Spring US 63 Bus. ends	Eastern end of US 63 Business overlap; western end of US 63 overlap
Oregon	Thayer	37.105	59.715	US 63 north – West Plains	Eastern end of US 63 overlap
Ripley	West Doniphan Township	78.768	126.765	Route 21 south – Pocahontas	Western end of Route 21 overlap
Ripley	West Doniphan Township	80.015	128.772	US 160 west – Alton	Western end of US 160 overlap
Ripley	Doniphan	81.904	131.812	US 160 east / Route 21 north / Route Y	Eastern end of US 160 and Route 21 overlaps
Butler	Neelyville	103.147	165.999	US 67 – Corning, Poplar Bluff	
Butler	Coon Island Township	109.200	175.740	Route HH	Route 142 changes from an east–west to north–south orientation
Butler	Poplar Bluff Township	116.700	187.810	Route 158 west – Harvell	
Butler	Poplar Bluff Township	122.328	196.868	Route 53 to US 67 Bus. / Route WW	
1.000 mi = 1.609 km; 1.000 km = 0.621 mi: Concurrency terminus
