= Tornado outbreak of January 29–30, 2013 =

Weather event in the United States

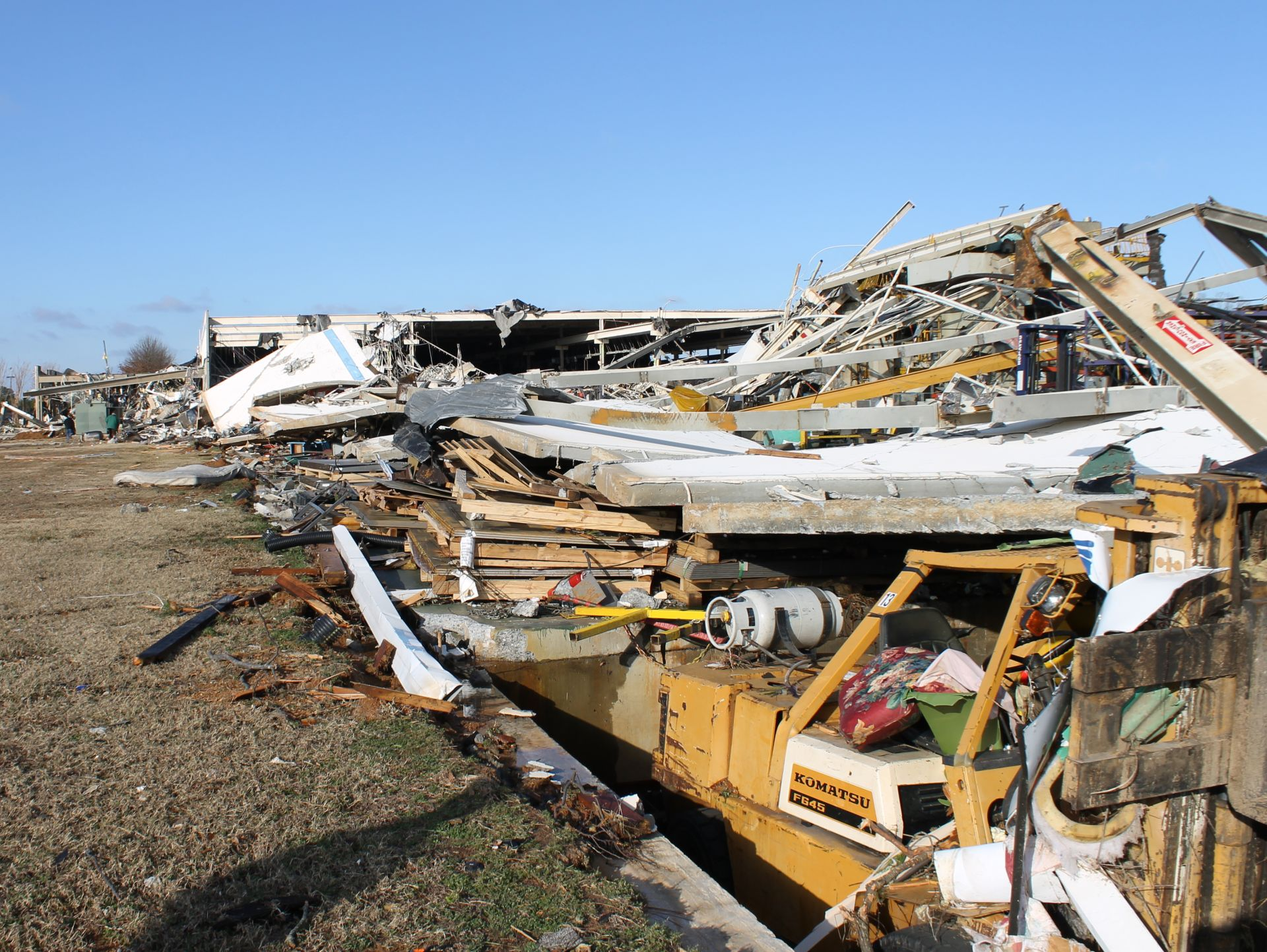
- High-end EF3 damage at a facility in Adairsville, Georgia

Meteorological history
- Formed: January 29, 2013
- Dissipated: January 30, 2013

Tornado outbreak
- Tornadoes: 66
- Max. rating: EF3 tornado
- Duration: 1 day, 10 hours, 24 minutes
- Highest winds: 160 mph (260 km/h) (Adairsville, Georgia EF3)
- Largest hail: 1.75 in (4.4 cm) in diameter (Dixon, Missouri)

Overall effects
- Fatalities: 2 total (1 tornadic, 1 non-tornadic)
- Injuries: 25
- Damage: $350 million
- Part of Tornadoes of 2013

A significant early season tornadic event affected portions of the Midwestern and Southern United States at the end of January 2013. The first signs of the outbreak came on January 23 as the Storm Prediction Center (SPC) detailed the eastward progression of a shortwave trough into an increasingly unstable air mass across portions of the lower Mississippi Valley; however, considerable uncertainty in the placement of severe thunderstorms caused the SPC to remove their threat outline. Succeeding many changes in the forecast, a Day 1 Moderate risk was issued for January 29, warning of the potential for widespread/significant damaging winds and a few strong tornadoes. The threat shifted eastward on January 30, encompassing a large section of the Southeastern United States. By late that day, the shortwave trough tracked northeastward into New England, ending the severe weather threat.

Between January 29–30, a total of 66 tornadoes were confirmed, making the event the seventh-largest winter tornado outbreak and fourth-largest January tornado outbreak on record. It was also the largest January tornado outbreak in Middle Tennessee on record and the second-largest tornado outbreak for any calendar month there. The strongest tornado, an EF3, impacted portions of Adairsville, Georgia, causing significant damage to an industrial building and several homes. One man was killed after a tree was downed on his mobile home, ending the longest-running streak without a tornado fatality in the United States which began on June 25, 2012. Another man who was taking shelter in a shed was killed by straight-line winds when a tree landed on the structure. A total of 25 people sustained injuries. Overall, the tornadoes resulted in an estimated $350 million (2013 USD) in damage.

== Meteorological synopsis ==
The final days of January brought a major tornado outbreak. In preparation for the event, the Storm Prediction Center outlined a rare Day 7 outlook region for portions of the Lower Mississippi Valley and Ark-La-Tex region. This region was subsequently removed by January 25 due to significant model differences, but was once again introduced in Day 4 and 5 convective outlook regions the following day. A Day 3 slight risk of severe weather was issued on January 27 from western Indiana down to central Texas, with the SPC warning of the potential for a significant severe weather event. A moderate risk of severe weather was forecasted in the afternoon January 28 Day 2 outlook, making it the fifth Day 2 moderate outlook issued in January over the past 15 years. While the main threat was expected to be damaging winds, produced by a potent squall line, the SPC also warned of a few strong, long-lived tornadoes. Numerous tornado watches were issued throughout the day as a squall line developed and worked eastward into the morning hours of January 30. In addition, a few semi-discrete supercells formed in the Lower Mississippi Valley. Multiple tornadoes touched down ahead of and along the squall line.

== Confirmed tornadoes ==
Confirmed tornadoes by Enhanced Fujita rating
EFU	EF0	EF1	EF2	EF3	EF4	EF5	Total
0	27	28	10	1	0	0	66

=== January 29 event ===
List of confirmed tornadoes – Tuesday, January 29, 2013 (Note: All dates are based on the local time zone where the tornado touched down; however, all times are in Coordinated Universal Time for consistency.)
EF#	Location	County / Parish	State	Start Coord.	Time (UTC)	Path length	Max width	Summary
EF1	WNW of Orlando	Logan	OK	36.155°N 97.456°W	12:48–12:49	1.1 mi (1.8 km)	40 yd (37 m)	A pole barn was partially destroyed, with debris (mostly sheet metal) tossed several hundred yards. Several pieces of heavy farm equipment were either moved or overturned and many trees were either downed or partially debarked.
EF1	SSE of Cedar Springs to NNW of Caplinger Mills	Cedar	MO	37.8388°N 93.8816°W	17:00–17:03	2.66 mi (4.28 km)	200 yd (180 m)	Several barns and outbuildings were damaged, with some destroyed. Homes suffered minor roof damage, a portable carport was destroyed, and numerous trees were downed.
EF1	SE of Vista to N of Quincy	St. Clair, Hickory	MO	37.9759°N 93.6112°W	17:15–17:25	8.58 mi (13.81 km)	400 yd (370 m)	At least four barns/outbuildings were destroyed and half of the roof was removed from another barn. Several homes sustained minor damaged and numerous trees were downed.
EF2	N of Short, OK to N of Natural Dam, AR	Sequoyah (OK), Crawford (AR)	OK, AR	35.605°N 94.498°W	20:55–21:04	9 mi (14 km)	700 yd (640 m)	The tornado touched down just inside Oklahoma, downing numerous trees before moving into Crawford County, Arkansas. In Crawford County, a house suffered minor damage and thousands of trees and numerous power poles were downed.
EF1	NW of Marthasville	Warren	MO	38.6622°N 91.1273°W	21:14–21:15	1.17 mi (1.88 km)	40 yd (37 m)	The roof was removed from a barn and a couple supporting poles were lifted 8 inches (20 cm). Several 2x4 planks from the barn were driven approximately 8 inches (20 cm) into the ground. A few structures had loose siding and a two-story home suffered roof and wall damage. Many trees, some very large, were downed along the path.
EF1	WSW of Harris to S of Goshen	Washington	AR	36.024°N 94.064°W	21:34–21:39	4.2 mi (6.8 km)	400 yd (370 m)	40 to 50 houses and mobile homes suffered mostly roof damage. Several barns, chicken houses, and outbuildings were destroyed and many trees and power poles were downed.
EF0	NW of Chain of Rocks	Lincoln	MO	38.9113°N 90.8106°W	21:36–21:37	1.66 mi (2.67 km)	30 yd (27 m)	Several residences suffered minor roof damage and many trees were snapped, with some smaller ones being thrown for varying distances.
EF1	SW of Berryville	Madison	AR	36.295°N 93.704°W	21:57–21:59	2 mi (3.2 km)	350 yd (320 m)	Several barns and outbuildings were destroyed and two homes sustained minor damage. Several cattle were killed and numerous trees and power poles were downed.
EF0	NW of Mineola	Wood	TX	32.6993°N 95.5502°W	00:15–00:16	0.19 mi (0.31 km)	325 yd (297 m)	A few trees were downed and tin roofing was removed from boat sheds along the shores of Lake Holbrook.
EF0	NW of Stringtown	Bolivar	MS	33.59°N 91.02°W	00:48–00:49	0.45 mi (0.72 km)	50 yd (46 m)	A large tree was uprooted and three homes suffered minor shingle damage.
EF0	SW of England	Pulaski	AR	34.4992°N 92.1013°W	02:01–02:06	5.25 mi (8.45 km)	50 yd (46 m)	A few trees were downed and most of the roof was removed from a barn. The barn had previously lost its roof on April 25, 2011.
EF1	NE of Doniphan	Ripley	MO	36.6933°N 90.7598°W	02:14–02:16	0.27 mi (0.43 km)	100 yd (91 m)	Two houses sustained moderate roof damage, a porch was lifted over a house, and a small boat was blown approximately 150 feet (46 m). A barn was heavily damaged and approximately 40 trees were downed.
EF2	ESE of Junland to NNE of Fisk	Butler	MO	36.76°N 90.26°W	02:45–02:47	3.39 mi (5.46 km)	100 yd (91 m)	A small, older, poorly constructed home was leveled, a mobile home was destroyed, and a couple of small structures were blown over. Many trees were snapped along the path.
EF0	NNE of Monticello to S of Old Union	Drew	AR	33.6486°N 91.7432°W	02:51–02:56	3.57 mi (5.75 km)	50 yd (46 m)	Several houses and a mobile home suffered roof damage, a carport was blown down, and another carport was blown against a tree line. Several outbuildings were damaged and many trees and power poles were downed.
EF1	SW of Delta to SW of Dutchtown	Cape Girardeau	MO	37.1847°N 89.7693°W	03:13–03:19	5.45 mi (8.77 km)	100 yd (91 m)	Ten buildings were damaged: Five businesses, two homes, one church, and two barns suffered roof damage, with a few of those structures losing their entire roofs. One home had roofing material that was blown into an adjacent house, damaging one side of that home. Numerous trees and power lines were downed as well.
EF1	S of Jackson	Cape Girardeau	MO	37.3309°N 89.7318°W	03:13–03:20	6.79 mi (10.93 km)	100 yd (91 m)	Several barns and outbuildings were either damaged or destroyed. Other structures suffered roof damage, including a church, and trees were downed.
EF2	W of Pioneer	West Carroll	LA	32.73°N 91.57°W	03:36–03:41	5.37 mi (8.64 km)	100 yd (91 m)	The tornado removed the roof from a house and knocked down several walls. Several outbuildings were destroyed, several travel trailers were flipped, and a few other buildings suffered minor roof damage. Several trees were downed as well.
EF0	E of Mulkeytown	Franklin	IL	37.97°N 89.11°W	03:38–03:39	0.58 mi (0.93 km)	75 yd (69 m)	Brief tornado with no damage.
EF2	Galatia	Saline	IL	37.8424°N 88.6174°W	04:16–04:18	0.97 mi (1.56 km)	125 yd (114 m)	The tornado removed the entire roof from an unsturdy house and collapsed three out of the four exterior walls. Another house had roof decking damage. Several other houses had window, shingle, and decking damage. One more house lost its brick chimney, a machine shed was leveled, and another shed had large doors blown out. A carport was demolished and a pole barn-type garage and an awning were destroyed. Several very large trees were downed as well. Two people were injured.
EF1	S of Skene to WNW of Cleveland	Bolivar	MS	33.68°N 90.8°W	05:10–05:16	5.53 mi (8.90 km)	150 yd (140 m)	Several homes suffered minor roof damage, with an awning being ripped from one home. Many trees, power poles, and traffic signals/signs were downed along the path.
EF0	SSE of Lynn Grove to NNW of Wiswell	Calloway	KY	36.5927°N 88.4261°W	05:36–05:39	2.12 mi (3.41 km)	100 yd (91 m)	Several sheds/outbuildings were either damaged or destroyed. A dog kennel was damaged, a metal carport was demolished, and several homes suffered minor shingle damage. One home had its porch columns shifted. Several trees and power poles were downed as well, with trees falling onto two cars.

=== January 30 event ===
List of confirmed tornadoes – Wednesday, January 30, 2013
EF#	Location	County / Parish	State	Start Coord.	Time (UTC)	Path length	Max width	Summary
EF1	NNE of Prospect	Orange	IN	38.6116°N 86.6098°W	06:47–06:48	0.37 mi (0.60 km)	75 yd (69 m)	The roof of a home was badly damaged, the porch of the house was thrown several yards, and twigs were driven into the side of the house. Several trees were downed as well.
EF2	SE of Herndon	Christian	KY	36.68°N 87.56°W	07:36–07:38	2.06 mi (3.32 km)	200 yd (180 m)	Three homes sustained major damage and a two-story home had its roof removed and windows blown out. Most of one barn collapsed, another was flattened, and the roof of a shop building was removed. Additional homes and other structures suffered minor damage and numerous trees were downed.
EF1	S of Hopkinsville to NNW of Pembroke	Christian	KY	36.7342°N 87.48°W	07:39–07:46	7.92 mi (12.75 km)	225 yd (206 m)	A grain bin was thrown 150 feet (46 m), several barns/sheds were leveled, and a few homes suffered mostly minor roof damage. Hundreds of trees were downed and at least two dozen power poles were snapped.
EF2	SE of Rosewood to SE of Penrod	Muhlenberg	KY	37.0595°N 87.0544°W	08:00–08:06	5.14 mi (8.27 km)	325 yd (297 m)	One home lost much of its roof and others had shingle and siding damage. Two mobile homes were completely destroyed and hundreds of trees were downed.
EF1	Hurricane Mills	Humphreys	TN	35.9684°N 87.8014°W	08:09–08:14	5.19 mi (8.35 km)	150 yd (140 m)	A barn was destroyed and several homes and buildings suffered significant roof damage, including some buildings at Loretta Lynn's Ranch and Campground. Approximately 500 trees were downed as well.
EF2	Coble	Hickman	TN	35.7676°N 87.6493°W	08:26–08:30	4.27 mi (6.87 km)	300 yd (270 m)	Several brick homes sustained major damage, with one losing most of the roof and a wall collapsing. A mobile home was destroyed, with the frame being wrapped around a tree. A cinder-block garage and at least three barns were demolished, and an RV was flipped over. Hundreds of trees were downed along the path as well.
EF1	SW of Hohenwald	Wayne, Lewis	TN	35.4324°N 87.7834°W	08:32–08:41	9.1 mi (14.6 km)	100 yd (91 m)	In Wayne County, a barn was completely destroyed, with two more sustaining major damage. Hundreds of trees were downed as well. In Lewis County, five power poles were snapped and hundreds of trees were downed.
EF0	S of White Bluff to Kingston Springs	Dickson, Cheatham	TN	36.0804°N 87.2217°W	08:45–08:52	7.25 mi (11.67 km)	100 yd (91 m)	Several homes suffered minor roof damage and hundreds of trees were downed along an intermittent path.
EF1	SE of Hohenwald	Lewis	TN	35.508°N 87.5406°W	08:46–08:50	3.74 mi (6.02 km)	200 yd (180 m)	Nine mobile homes were damaged or destroyed. An outbuilding was demolished, and hundreds of trees were snapped or uprooted.
EF1	Ashland City	Cheatham	TN	36.2786°N 87.0668°W	08:51–08:54	3.23 mi (5.20 km)	125 yd (114 m)	A tornado, alongside straight-line winds to its south, damaged 46 buildings, including 37 houses, 2 churches, and 3 apartment buildings; 2 homes were left uninhabitable. Hundreds of trees were snapped or uprooted.
EF2	NNW of Chestnut Grove to E of Courtland	Robertson	TN	36.4389°N 86.9095°W	08:59–09:05	4.97 mi (8.00 km)	200 yd (180 m)	Several homes and other structures (barns, outbuildings, etc.) sustained roof damage, the roof of a gas station was partially torn off, and a gas pump awning was damaged. An outbuilding was destroyed, with debris blown about 100 yards (91 m) away. A business received roof damage and a warehouse had a door blown in and half of the roof removed. A TVA transmission tower and many trees were downed as well.
EF0	WNW of Joelton	Davidson	TN	36.3273°N 86.915°W	09:00–09:06	5.55 mi (8.93 km)	50 yd (46 m)	Many trees were downed and a barn suffered roof damage.
EF0	S of Fairview	Williamson	TN	35.8841°N 87.1233°W	09:01–09:02	0.92 mi (1.48 km)	75 yd (69 m)	About 30 trees were downed and an outbuilding lost its roof near Tennessee State Route 840. Part of the path was inaccessible so the path length may have been longer.
EF0	NE of Buck Grove to SSE of Brandenburg	Meade	KY	37.9377°N 86.1042°W	09:05–09:06	1 mi (1.6 km)	200 yd (180 m)	Several homes and a small shed were damaged and numerous trees and power lines were downed.
EF1	E of Springfield	Robertson	TN	36.4798°N 86.8111°W	09:05–09:11	5.75 mi (9.25 km)	150 yd (140 m)	Several homes, businesses, and barns suffered mostly minor to moderate roof damage (some of the damage was more severe) and hundreds of trees were downed.
EF0	Millersville to SW of Cottontown	Davidson, Sumner	TN	36.4798°N 86.8111°W	09:10–09:23	11.65 mi (18.75 km)	75 yd (69 m)	Several trees were downed, a few homes received minor roof damage, and a barn was destroyed in Davidson County. The tornado moved into Sumner County and into Millersville. Numerous homes suffered minor roof and exterior damage and a few trees were downed as the tornado crossed Interstate 65 in Millersville before it continued northeast out of town. Several more homes suffered minor damage, two garage buildings were destroyed, and more trees were downed before the tornado lifted.
EF0	East Nashville	Davidson	TN	36.2115°N 86.7689°W	09:12–09:15	3.2 mi (5.1 km)	75 yd (69 m)	Numerous homes and a health department building suffered minor roof and exterior damage. Many trees were downed, several of which landed on mobile homes in a mobile home park. Fences were downed as well. The tornado lifted before reaching the Cumberland River, in an area directly opposite of the Opryland Hotel. One person was injured.
EF1	SSW of Cross Plains to SW of Portland	Robertson, Sumner	TN	36.5122°N 86.7177°W	09:12–09:17	5.98 mi (9.62 km)	100 yd (91 m)	In Robertson County, a barn, a mobile home, and several site-built home sustained varying degrees of damage and many trees were downed. The tornado moved into Sumner County, where it downed more trees before dissipating.
EF0	E of Elizabeth, IN to Southwestern Louisville, KY	Harrison (IN), Jefferson (KY)	IN, KY	38.1229°N 85.9142°W	09:17–09:19	2.67 mi (4.30 km)	215 yd (197 m)	Tornado damaged four houses and two barns and downed several trees. The porch of one home was lifted and thrown 30 feet (9.1 m) and trees and tress wires were downed. It then crossed the Ohio River and into Kentucky, where many trees were downed and a trampoline was blown over. A pontoon boat was thrown into a fence and a large plastic sign was damaged.
EF0	Franklin	Williamson	TN	35.926°N 86.863°W	09:18–09:19	2 mi (3.2 km)	75 yd (69 m)	Many homes, several businesses, two schools, and a church suffered mostly minor roof and siding damage. Many trees were downed, one of which fell on a pavilion, as well as several power poles.
EF0	Northeastern Hendersonville to E of Gallatin	Sumner	TN	36.3336°N 86.5463°W	09:23–09:35	10.61 mi (17.08 km)	125 yd (114 m)	Hundreds of trees were downed, with some falling on homes and outbuildings. Other homes and mobile homes suffered minor roof and siding damage. The Gallatin Marina and surrounding docks were damaged as well.
EF2	Mount Juliet	Wilson	TN	36.2208°N 86.5461°W	09:25–09:30	4.53 mi (7.29 km)	150 yd (140 m)	A warehouse, an automotive business, and a Dollar General store were heavily damaged, and other businesses received minor to moderate damage, including a distribution warehouse for The Tennessean that lost much of its roof and a three-story building which lost its roof and several walls. Numerous trees, power poles, and fences were downed and outbuildings sustained significant damage. Many homes sustained minor damage along the path.
EF0	N of Castalian Springs	Sumner	TN	36.3974°N 86.3425°W	09:34–09:37	3.63 mi (5.84 km)	100 yd (91 m)	A market and several homes suffered minor roof damage and several trees were downed.
EF0	S of Bethpage	Sumner, Trousdale	TN	36.4594°N 86.3364°W	09:37–09:43	5.84 mi (9.40 km)	50 yd (46 m)	Several homes and outbuildings received minor roof damage. A small shed was destroyed and numerous trees were downed as well.
EF2	ESE of Oakland to E of Smiths Grove	Warren	KY	37.0272°N 86.241°W	09:38–09:41	2.96 mi (4.76 km)	250 yd (230 m)	Four grain bins were destroyed, with debris thrown several hundred yards, fencing was torn down, and a semi-truck/trailer was flipped on Interstate 65. A barn and a large metal structure were heavily damaged as well. Trees, power lines, and signs were downed along the path.
EF1	N of Lebanon	Wilson, Trousdale	TN	36.282°N 86.33°W	09:40–09:50	10.03 mi (16.14 km)	150 yd (140 m)	Mostly minor to moderate roof and property damage occurred as the tornado crossed the Wilson/Trousdale County line (the Cumberland River) three times (the river itself was crossed four times as the county line did not run along the river at the last crossing). However, several structures suffered significant roof damage and outbuildings were destroyed. Hundreds of trees were downed as well.
EF1	SSW of College Grove to S of Cedar Grove	Williamson, Rutherford	TN	35.739°N 86.703°W	09:41–09:46	4.59 mi (7.39 km)	150 yd (140 m)	Two farm buildings and four barns were heavily damaged, several homes received roof and siding damage, and one outbuilding was destroyed. Dozens of trees were downed as well, with some falling on homes.
EF1	E of Rocky Hill	Edmonson	KY	37.0671°N 86.1368°W	09:42–09:44	2.77 mi (4.46 km)	100 yd (91 m)	Two barns were destroyed and two outbuildings and a home lost their roofs. Several trees were downed as well. The damage path was intermittent.
EF0	SW of Lafayette	Macon	TN	36.4876°N 86.1527°W	09:47–09:48	0.97 mi (1.56 km)	50 yd (46 m)	A couple of old barns were destroyed and an outbuilding was damaged. Dozens of trees were downed as well.
EF1	Rocky Hill	Barren	KY	36.9433°N 86.057°W	09:49–09:50	0.34 mi (0.55 km)	50 yd (46 m)	A large barn was destroyed, another barn had doors and siding removed, and several trees were downed by this brief tornado.
EF0	WNW of Red Boiling Springs	Macon	TN	36.5488°N 85.9216°W	10:01–10:03	1.53 mi (2.46 km)	75 yd (69 m)	An older home suffered significant damage, a barn lost much of its roof, and a few hundred trees were downed.
EF1	SE of Brandenburg	Monroe (MS), Lamar (AL)	MS, AL	33.8361°N 88.3454°W	10:25–10:36	10.82 mi (17.41 km)	300 yd (270 m)	In Monroe County, four houses suffered roof damage, two barns/outbuildings were damaged, and several trees were downed. In Lamar County, Alabama, many trees were downed and two structures (one home and one outbuilding) sustained minor shingle damage.
EF0	NNE of Woodbury to W of Half Acre	Cannon	TN	35.8431°N 86.0758°W	10:29–10:38	6.65 mi (10.70 km)	200 yd (180 m)	About a hundred trees were downed and minor roof and structural damage occurred along the path.
EF0	S of Phillipsburg	Marion	KY	37.4393°N 85.269°W	10:44–10:45	0.12 mi (0.19 km)	50 yd (46 m)	Very brief tornado destroyed a mobile home and moved a shed off of its foundation. Two people sustained minor injuries.
EF1	ESE of Dellrose	Lincoln	TN	35.0987°N 86.7846°W	10:46–10:53	5.28 mi (8.50 km)	250 yd (230 m)	Two irrigation systems and a trailer were flipped, and a barn had large metal doors blown in. A second metal barn was destroyed, and a third suffered significant roof and siding damage. A garage collapsed, the side of a barn was blown in, and part of the roof was removed from a house. Many trees were downed along the path.
EF1	NW of Fayette	Fayette	AL	33.7264°N 87.9037°W	11:18–11:25	6.5 mi (10.5 km)	500 yd (460 m)	A house and several other structures suffered minor roof and structural damage. Hundreds of trees were downed as well.
EF0	Manchester	Coffee	TN	35.4886°N 86.0923°W	11:25–11:30	5.22 mi (8.40 km)	75 yd (69 m)	A scoreboard was destroyed and trees were downed at Coffee County Middle School. Elsewhere, after the tornado crossed Interstate 24, more trees were downed and roofs were damaged before it dissipated.
EF0	Ferguson	Pulaski	KY	37.0598°N 84.6052°W	11:30–11:31	0.5 mi (0.80 km)	150 yd (140 m)	Brief tornado caused roof and siding damage to several structures. It also downed many trees, one of which destroyed an outbuilding.
EF0	SSE of Nauvoo	Walker	AL	33.9342°N 87.4969°W	11:42–11:46	4.9 mi (7.9 km)	200 yd (180 m)	A tree fell on a mobile home, causing moderate damage. A house sustained shingle damage, an outbuilding was destroyed, and dozens of trees were downed. This tornado occurred just after a microburst had hit the area.
EF1	Northern Arley	Winston	AL	34.0623°N 87.3697°W	11:50–11:59	10.39 mi (16.72 km)	1,000 yd (910 m)	A portion of a mobile home roof was thrown a quarter of a mile. Nearly 20 residences received damage, including one house that had severe roof damage. Several boat houses, or house boats, were destroyed on Smith Lake before the tornado dissipated. Thousands of trees were downed along the path.
EF1	N of Addison to W of West Point	Winston, Cullman	AL	34.2079°N 87.1797°W	12:01–12:06	6.42 mi (10.33 km)	300 yd (270 m)	In Winston County, a small airplane hangar was destroyed, and parts of the roofs were removed from a house and an outbuilding. Several trees were downed as well. In Cullman County, the tornado destroyed a barn and a mobile home and downed a few more trees before lifting.
EF3	SW of Adairsville to NNW of Petersburg	Bartow, Gordon	GA	34.3411°N 84.9527°W	16:12–16:43	21.78 mi (35.05 km)	900 yd (820 m)	1 death – Severe damage in the area with over 100 cars thrown on Interstate 75. In Bartow County, 95 structures were damaged. Of those, 31 were destroyed, 17 sustained major damage, and 47 had minor damage. These included a large manufacturing plant and many businesses in Adairsville. In Gordon County, at least 268 homes, including 66 mobile homes, were impacted. Of these homes, 30 were completely destroyed, 110 had major damage, and 70 sustained minor damage. Thousands of trees and many power lines were downed in both counties, with several of those trees falling onto homes. 17 people were injured in this tornado (nine in Bartow County and eight in Gordon County), the first killer tornado in the United States since June 24, 2012. This tornado took a track very close to an EF3 tornado on December 22, 2011.
EF1	NW of Blue Ridge	Gilmer, Fannin	GA	34.8171°N 84.4279°W	17:05–17:15	11.77 mi (18.94 km)	900 yd (820 m)	The tornado downed hundreds of trees and snapped eight power poles in Gilmer County before moving into Fannin County. There, hundreds more trees were downed, with some landing on and causing damage to a total of 30 structures. About 100 power poles were snapped as well. One person was injured.
EF0	NW of Newton	Baker	GA	31.3142°N 84.3536°W	23:09–23:12	1.19 mi (1.92 km)	25 yd (23 m)	A house sustained minor damage and several trees were downed.
EF0	N of Albany	Lee	GA	31.6405°N 84.1608°W	23:12–23:14	1.51 mi (2.43 km)	25 yd (23 m)	Several trees were downed.

== See also ==
- List of United States tornadoes from January to February 2013
- Tornadoes of 2013
