= Missouri Route 53 =

State highway in Missouri, U.S.

Route 53

Route information
- Maintained by MoDOT
- Length: 34.602 mi (55.687 km)
- Existed: 1922–present

Major junctions
- South end: Route 25 in Holcomb
- US 62 in Campbell
- North end: US 67 Bus. in Poplar Bluff

Location
- Country: United States
- State: Missouri

Highway system
- Missouri State Highway System; Interstate; US; State; Supplemental
← Route 52	→ US 54

Route 53 is a highway in southeastern Missouri. Its southern terminus is at Route 25 in Holcomb. Its northern terminus is at Business U.S. Route 67 Business in Poplar Bluff.

Route 53 is one of the original state highways and has remained essentially unchanged since 1922.

== Major intersections ==
County	Location	mi	km	Destinations	Notes
Dunklin	Holcomb	0.000	0.000	Route 25 – Clarkton, Kennett	
Dunklin	Campbell	6.949	11.183	US 62 east – Malden	Southern end of US 62 overlap
Dunklin	Campbell	7.480	12.038	US 62 west / Route WW – Piggott	Northern end of US 62 overlap
Butler	Qulin	20.460	32.927	Route 51 south – Fagus	Southern end of Route 51 overlap
Butler	Ash Hill Township	23.424	37.697	Route 51 north – Broseley	Northern end of Route 51 overlap
Butler	Poplar Bluff	33.551	53.995	Route 142 west / Route WW	
Butler	Poplar Bluff	34.602	55.687	US 67 Bus. (S. Westwood Boulevard)	
1.000 mi = 1.609 km; 1.000 km = 0.621 mi: Concurrency terminus
