= Neely Township, Butler County, Missouri =

Township in the U.S. state of Missouri

Neely Township
- Township
- Coordinates: 36°33′47″N 090°31′06″W
- Country: United States
- State: Missouri
- County: Butler

Area
  - Total: 59.90 sq mi (155.15 km^{2})
  - Land: 59.87 sq mi (155.05 km^{2})
  - Water: 0.039 sq mi (0.1 km^{2}) 0.06%
- Elevation: 305 ft (93 m)

Population (2010)
  - Total: 1,126
  - Density: 21/sq mi (8.1/km^{2})
- FIPS code: 29-51392
- GNIS feature ID: 0766355

Neely Township is one of ten townships in Butler County, Missouri, USA. As of the 2010 census, its population was 1,126.

Neely Township was organized in 1871, and named after Obadiah Neely, an early citizen.

== Geography ==
Neely Township covers an area of 59.9 square miles (155 km^{2}) and contains one incorporated settlement, Neelyville. It contains seven cemeteries: Crab, Harris Ridge, Lutz, Neeleyville, Roberts, Sheely and Sims.

The streams of Big Cane Creek, Cane Creek, Cope Branch, Fox Branch and Gaines Slough run through this township.

== Transportation ==
Neely Township contains one airport or landing strip: Wattle Landing Strip.
