= Nyssa, Missouri =

- Unincorporated community
- Location within Missouri Location within the United States
- Coordinates: 36.6397790°N 90.2426029°W
- Country: United States
- State: Missouri
- County: Butler
- Elevation: 440 ft (130 m)
- Time zone: UTC-6 (Central (CST))
  - Summer (DST): UTC-5 (CDT)
- Area code: 573
- GNIS feature ID: 740009

Nyssa is an unincorporated community in southeast Butler County, in the U.S. state of Missouri.

The community is on Missouri Route 51 2.5 miles south of Broseley and three miles north of Qulin. Poplar Bluff is eleven miles to the northwest.

The community was a timber station on the old Chicago, Burlington and Quincy Railroad. Nyssa is the generic botanical name for the locally abundant tupelo gum. William N. Barron gave the town its name.
