= William N. Barron =

British lawyer (1859 – 1935)

- Born: William Nelson Barron; 7 December 1859
- Died: 21 October 1935 (aged 75)
- Occupation: Lawyer

William Nelson Barron (7 December 1859 – 21 October 1935) was a lawyer from Reading, Berkshire, England who settled in Poplar Bluff, Missouri in about 1894. In 1900, he became the plant manager and president of a factory that manufactured barrel staves and headers, known as the Brooklyn Cooperage Company after 1910, a subsidiary of the American Sugar Refining Company.

The unassembled barrels were shipped to Cuba and other sugar-producing countries. Barron oversaw the construction of the Butler County Railroad connecting Piggott, Arkansas to Poplar Bluff, Missouri, which was used primarily to haul lumber before being sold in 1928 to the St. Louis-San Francisco Railway. Barron named the towns along the railroad, which included:

- Broseley, Missouri, after his wife's hometown of Broseley, England.
- Tipperary, Missouri, after the song "It's a Long Way to Tipperary". Workers had to walk a "long way" to install a railroad switch there.
- Batesville, Missouri, constructed on Horace Bates' farm.
- Spread, Missouri
- Fagus, Missouri. Fagus is the Latin botanical genus for the European Beech native to his home country of England. Barron was surprised to actually find beech trees growing nearby.
- Quercus, Missouri. Quercus is the Latin botanical name for the oak tree.
- Nyssa, Missouri. Nyssa is the Latin botanical name for the tupelo tree.
- Celtis, Missouri. Celtis is the Latin botanical name for the hackberry tree.
- Ilex, Missouri. Ilex is the Latin botanical name for the holly tree.
- Platanus, Missouri. Platanus is the Latin botanical name for the sycamore tree.
- Ulmus, Missouri. Ulmus is the Latin botanical name for the elm tree.

Barron stated that he used Latin botanical names for the towns instead of the monotonous English tree names which were overused in Missouri. After exhausting the timber in the area, Barron became president of what would be called the Inter-River Drainage District, which drained thousands of acres of cut-over swamp land in Butler County, Missouri, by the construction of 200 miles (320 km) of ditches and 50 miles (80 km) of levees, starting in 1919.

== Legacy ==
Barron Road in Poplar Bluff is named after him.
