= Rossville, Missouri =

Rossville
- Unincorporated community
- Location within Missouri
- Coordinates: 36°43′59″N 90°14′47″W
- Country: United States
- State: Missouri
- County: Butler
- Elevation: 322 ft (98 m)
- Time zone: Central Standard Time

Rossville is an unincorporated community in eastern Butler County, in the U.S. state of Missouri. It is located on Missouri Route 51 between Batesville to the south and Fisk to the north. It is approximately 7.5 miles east of Poplar Bluff.

The community was named after Mrs. Ross, an early citizen. It is situated at an elevation of 322 feet (98 m).

During Shelby's Raid in 1863, Joseph O. Shelby sent a detachment of scouts to Clarksville, Dardanelle, and Ozark in Arkansas to spot Federal troops.
