= Ash Hill =

Ash Hill may refer to:

== United States ==
- Ash Hill (Maryland), a historic house in Maryland
- Ash Hill, Missouri, an unincorporated community
- Ash Hill, North Carolina, an unincorporated community
- Ash Hill, California, an unincorporated community

== New Zealand ==
- Ash Hill, New Zealand, in the Auckland volcanic field
