= Kinzer =

Kinzer or Kinzers may refer to:

== People ==
- Daria Kinzer (b. 1988), a Croatian singer
- Edward B. Kinzer (1917-1942), a United States Navy officer and Navy Cross recipient
- John J. Kinzer (1891-1986), American farmer and politician
- J. Roland Kinzer (1874-1955), an American politician
- Matt Kinzer (b. 1963), an American professional baseball and football player
- Stephen Kinzer (b. 1951), an American author and newspaper reporter

== Places ==
=== United States ===
- Kinzer, Missouri
- Kinzers, Pennsylvania
- John Kinzer House in Indiana

== Ships ==
- USS Kinzer (APD-91), originally laid down as destroyer escort USS Kinzer (DE-232), a United States Navy fast transport in commission from 1944 to 1946
