= Ash Hill, Missouri =

- Unincorporated community
- Location within Missouri Location within the United States
- Coordinates: 36°46′32″N 90°13′59″W
- Country: United States
- State: Missouri
- County: Butler
- Elevation: 331 ft (101 m)
- Time zone: UTC-6 (Central (CST))
  - Summer (DST): UTC-5 (CDT)
- Area code: 573
- GNIS feature ID: 713419

Ash Hill is an unincorporated community in eastern Butler County, in the U.S. state of Missouri. The community is located on Missouri Route 51 ten miles east of Poplar Bluff and just over one mile west of Fisk and the St. Francis River which forms the Butler-Stoddard county line. The Missouri Pacific Railway passes through the community.

== History ==
A post office called Ash Hill was established in 1861 and remained in operation until 1894. The community was named for ash trees on the summits near the town site.
