= Cane Creek Township, Butler County, Missouri =

Township in the U.S. state of Missouri

Cane Creek Township
- Township
- Coordinates: 36°53′04″N 090°34′45″W
- Country: United States
- State: Missouri
- County: Butler

Area
  - Total: 42.88 sq mi (111.06 km^{2})
  - Land: 42.85 sq mi (110.99 km^{2})
  - Water: 0.027 sq mi (0.07 km^{2}) 0.06%
- Elevation: 469 ft (143 m)

Population (2010)
  - Total: 468
  - Density: 12/sq mi (4.5/km^{2})
- FIPS code: 29-11044
- GNIS feature ID: 0766351

Cane Creek Township is one of ten townships in Butler County, Missouri, USA. As of the 2010 census, its population was 468.

== Geography ==
Cane Creek Township covers an area of 42.88 square miles (111.1 km^{2}) and contains no incorporated settlements. It contains two cemeteries: Margaret Trainor and Shiloh.

The streams of Dry Branch and Ligett Creek run through this township.
