= Missouri Route 158 =

State highway in Missouri, U.S.

Route 158
- MO 158 highlighted in red

Route information
- Maintained by MoDOT
- Length: 5.368 mi (8.639 km)

Major junctions
- West end: Future I-57 / US 67 / US 160 southwest of Poplar Bluff
- East end: Route 142 south of Poplar Bluff

Location
- Country: United States
- State: Missouri

Highway system
- Missouri State Highway System; Interstate; US; State; Supplemental
← Route 157	→ US 159

Route 158 is a short highway in Butler County, Missouri. The eastern terminus is at Route 142 and the road runs straight west for 6 miles (10 km). The western terminus is at the intersection of U.S. Route 67 (Future Interstate 57) and U.S. Route 160 about 10 miles (16 km) southwest of Poplar Bluff. The town of Harviell is the only town on the highway.

== Route description ==
Route 158 begins at an intersection with US 67/US 160 (Future I-57) in Butler County, where the road continues west as part of US 160. From the western terminus, the route heads east as a two-lane, undivided road, passing through a mix of farms and woods with some homes. Route 158 reaches the community of Harviell, where it passes to the south residences and crosses Union Pacific's Hoxie Subdivision. Past Harviell, the road runs through farmland and intersects Route BB. Farther east, Route 158 comes to its eastern terminus at an intersection with Route 142.

== Major intersections ==
The entire route is in Butler County.

Location	mi	km	Destinations	Notes
	0.000– 0.138	0.000– 0.222	Future I-57 / US 67 / US 160 – Corning, Poplar Bluff	Partial cloverleaf interchange; Eastern terminus of US 160; Western terminus of Route 158
	2.715	4.369	Route BB	Northern terminus of Route BB
	5.368	8.639	Route 142 – Neelyville, Poplar Bluff	Eastern terminus
1.000 mi = 1.609 km; 1.000 km = 0.621 mi
