= Oglesville, Missouri =

- Unincorporated community
- Location within Missouri Location within the United States
- Coordinates: 36°34′49″N 90°18′37″W
- Country: United States
- State: Missouri
- County: Butler
- Elevation: 322 ft (98 m)
- Time zone: UTC-6 (Central (CST))
  - Summer (DST): UTC-5 (CDT)
- Area code: 573
- GNIS feature ID: 723705

Oglesville is an unincorporated community in southeastern Butler County, in the U.S. state of Missouri.

The community is on Missouri Route N between Carola to the southwest and Qulin to the northeast. The Black River flows past 1.5 miles to the northwest.

The community was named after Louis Ogle, an early citizen.
