= Vastus, Missouri =

- Unincorporated community
- Location within Missouri Location within the United States
- Coordinates: 36°33′04″N 90°24′29″W
- Country: United States
- State: Missouri
- County: Butler
- Elevation: 308 ft (94 m)
- Time zone: UTC-6 (Central (CST))
  - Summer (DST): UTC-5 (CDT)
- Area code: 573
- GNIS feature ID: 728152

Vastus is an unincorporated community in southern Butler County, in the U.S. state of Missouri.

The community is on Missouri Route H. Neelyville is five miles to the west, the Black River flows past 3.5 miles to the east, and the Missouri-Arkansas border is 3.5 miles to the south.

== History ==
A post office called Vastus was established in 1891 and remained in operation until 1927. Vastus is a name derived from Latin, signifying "great".

== Climate ==
The climate in this area is characterized by hot, humid summers and generally mild to cool winters. According to the Köppen Climate Classification system, Vastus has a humid subtropical climate, abbreviated "Cfa" on climate maps.
