= List of killings by law enforcement officers in the United States, May 2014 =

This is a list of people reported killed by non-military law enforcement officers in the United States in May 2014, whether in the line of duty or not, and regardless of reason or method. The listing documents the occurrence of a death, making no implications regarding wrongdoing or justification on the part of the person killed or officer involved. Killings are arranged by date of the incident that caused death. Different death dates, if known, are noted in the description. The table below lists 101 people.

== May 2014 ==
Date	Name (Age) of Deceased	Race	State (City)	Description
2014‑05‑31	Brandon Ellingson (20)	Black	Missouri (Lake of the Ozarks)	Ellingson was pulled over while boating at the Lake of the Ozarks, suspected of operating the boat while intoxicated. Missouri State Trooper Anthony Piercy handcuffed Ellingson, who then fell out of the boat and drowned in the lake. On December 18, 2015, Piercy was charged with involuntary manslaughter in Ellingson's death.
2014-05-31	Rock, Tayler (22)		Kansas (Dexter)	A deputy pulled over a vehicle for a traffic violation. Tayler Rock and a one-year-old child were inside. As the deputy approached the vehicle, Rock tried to drive away, allegedly dragging and running over the deputy, and Rock was shot. The deputy then removed the child from the vehicle and performed CPR on Rock, who was pronounced dead at a hospital.
2014-05-31	Douglas DaMoude (64)	White	Nebraska (Lincoln)	
2014-05-31	Brian Scott Hiatt (49)	White	California (Turlock)	Two Merced County sheriffs' deputies shot Hiatt dead during a confrontation. Hiatt was a suspect in an incident the previous day in which two women were shot and killed.
2014-05-31	Etoine Baucum (44)	Black	New Jersey (Paterson)	Baucum was armed with an undetermined firearm in the area of 85 Montgomery St. when police arrived at 2:20 a.m., said Michael DeMarco, the chief assistant Passaic County Prosecutor. Detectives ordered him to drop his weapon — but Baucum did not comply. Instead, Baucum pointed the gun at one of the responding detectives — and another detective fired his service weapon at the suspect and killed him with a single shot.
2014-05-31	Sandy James McCall (33)	Black	North Carolina (Raeford)	Police were investigating a report of a suspicious person when they encountered McCall. Sgt. Samuel Morant shot and killed McCall during an altercation.
2014-05-30	Danny Michael Wadsworth Jr. (31)	White	Nevada (Las Vegas)	Police began pursuing Wadsworth after two women reported their purses as stolen, tracking him via one woman's cell phone. When police caught up with Wadsworth, he allegedly began shooting at them. Officers Jeffrey Gentry and Bryce Martines returned fire, killing him.
2014-05-30	Quintico Goolsby (36)	Black	Indiana (Indianapolis)	
2014-05-30	Jose Luis Arambula (31)	Hispanic	Arizona (Green Valley)	
2014-05-30	Larry Smith (61)	Unknown race	Kentucky (Hazard)	
2014-05-30	James Andrew Brown II (29)	White	Virginia (Norfolk)	A Virginia teenager was shot and killed on the way home from a high school graduation, a police officer was gunned down, and another officer wounded by a raging ex-con who was later killed by police, authorities said.
2014-05-30	Mark Anthony Blocker (20)	Black	Maryland (Suitland)	Officers were responding to reports of two men arguing, one with a gun. Cpl. Vincent Tabbs and Officer Andrew Nacin shot and killed Blocker when he refused their orders to drop the weapon, which was discovered to be a pellet gun.
2014-05-30	Brandon Lee Macias Jimenez (26)	Hispanic	California (Woodland)	An officer shot and killed Jimenez while he allegedly held a gun to the head of a woman he had taken hostage. Police say they tried to talk with Jimenez, but he refused to release the woman.
2014-05-29	Duane Erick Strong (18)	Black	Florida (Tallahassee)	A police officer heard gunshots near a sports bar and saw Strong sitting in his car. When Strong drove away, police shot at him and rammed his car with a police vehicle. It was never determined if Strong was the one who fired the initial gunshots. Strong's family filed a wrongful death lawsuit against the city in 2015.
2014-05-29	Ransom Duane McCoy (45)	White	Tennessee (Bristol)	Ransom Duane McCoy, 45, of Bristol, Virginia, crashed a green Ford F-150 pickup through a chain link fence at a property on Keith Drive off Blountville Highway, according to Sullivan County, Tennessee Sheriff Wayne Anderson, who said he then "ran at an officer." McCoy was shot and killed.
2014-05-29	Jose Valerio (17)	Black	Louisiana (New Orleans)	The shooting happened around 2 a.m. in the 2600 block of Dreux Street where three women—ages 23, 24 and 27—were approached by a gunman while stopped to deal with a flat tire, NOPD said. The 25-year-old SUNO officer was with the women after they called him to help fix the flat. A SUNO officer was changing the tire when a car, possibly a Chrysler, approached and a gunman jumped out, pointed a gun at one of the women and demanded her purse, NOPD said in a news release. The woman handed over her purse. At that time, the officer "identified himself as a law enforcement officer," drew his gun and exchanged gunfire with the robber.
2014-05-29	Gerrit D. Vos (22)	White	California (Newport Beach)	Police responded to a disturbance at a 7-Eleven store. When officers tried to break up an altercation between the employee and Vos, Vos allegedly lunged at the officers with a sharp object. Officers opened fire on him, and he later died in a hospital.
2014-05-29	McKinnis, Craig (44)		Kansas (Kansas City)	McKinnis died after being restrained by police after he and his girlfriend were pulled over. During his arrest McKinnis stated "I can't breathe", and he died during his arrest. McKinnis's girlfriend sued the Kansas City, Kansas Police Department.
2014-05-28	Weera, Sanasga (60)		Virginia (Portsmouth)	Weera was struck and killed by a police car. The officer was not responding to a call.
2014-05-28	Jeremy Vann (20)	Black	Mississippi (Southaven)	
2014-05-28	Ricky Lee Higgins (54)	White	Missouri (Holden)	
2014-05-27	Jason Westcott (29)	White	Florida (Tampa)	Several police officers, executing a drug warrant, shot and killed Westcott when he raised a pistol against them, possibly thinking he was fending off robbers. Undercover officers had observed Westcott, dead, of dealing drugs while armed. At the time of his death, Westcott had only $2 worth of marijuana in his possession.
2014-05-27	Albert Robert Clayburn (42)	White	Ohio (Hamersville)	
2014-05-26	Noel Enrique Aguilar (23)	Hispanic	California (Long Beach)	
2014-05-26	Terry Heath (45)	Black	Ohio (Dayton)	
2014-05-25	Isaac Sims (26)	White	Missouri (Kansas City)	On Sunday, May 25, officers were called to his home to investigate reports that he had shot at his father and a neighbor, who were not injured. Officers reported hearing several gunshots inside the home and a standoff began. After about four hours, Sims left the home. Police say he pointed a rifle at officers, who fired. Sims was pronounced dead a short time later.
2014-05-25	Montez Dewayne Hambric (26)	Black	North Carolina (Winston)	
2014-05-24	Frank "Sid" Sidney Smody (59)	White	Missouri (Neelyville)	Smody's daughter called both the sheriff and her dad to report a prowler on her rural property. A confrontation between Smody and the Sheriff's officer resulted in Smody being shot and killed.
2014-05-24	Carlos Ocana (54)	Hispanic	California (Los Angeles)	
2014-05-24	Michael Myers (62)	Black	Illinois (Chicago)	
2014-05-24	Christian Sierra (17)	Hispanic	Virginia (Purcellville)	
2014-05-24	Shiquan M. Krouser (27)	Black	New York (Poughkeepsie)	
2014-05-24	Henry Curtis (49)	White	California (Lebec)	
2014-05-23	Jason Wilson (42)	White	California (Citrus Heights)	
2014-05-22	Joshua Marshall Foskey (34)	White	Georgia (Hazelhurst)	
2014-05-22	Ralph Chavez (37)	Hispanic	New Mexico (Albuquerque)	
2014-05-21	Raymond Eugene Garcia (31)	Hispanic	Colorado (Greeley)	31-year-old Raymond Garcia was shot by Greeley police inside the lobby of Comfort Inn, 2467 W. 29th Street after he allegedly pulled a gun on officers. Garcia was involved in a prostitution sting at Comfort Inn. Officers fired 17 shots at Garcia, and 7 hit him. The shooting was justified.
2014-05-21	Robert Michael Duncklee (28)	White	Arizona (Tucson)	Two officers responded to a trespassing call. Upon their arrival, they knocked on the front door of the apartment and announced themselves as Tucson police officers. After receiving no response, the officers entered the apartment through the unlocked front door. As they were checking the apartment for any occupants, they came across a closed bedroom door. The officers again identified themselves as Tucson police officers. A male subject then exited the bedroom door and brandished a hockey stick. There was a confrontation between the male subject and the two officers during which time both officers discharged their weapons, striking the male subject.
2014-05-21	Jermassioun Viondrey Rodgers (20)	Black	Florida (Orlando)	
2014-05-20	Martin Figueroa (26)	Hispanic	California (Fresno)	Martin Figueroa was shot and killed by Fresno Police after threatening officers with a knife, according to Fresno Police Chief Jerry Dyer. Figueroa's family had called 911 for help, saying he was high on methamphetamine. In February 2017 a federal judge ruled that the family's wrongful death lawsuit may proceed to a jury trial.
2014-05-20	Tiffany Morton (27)	Unknown race	Texas (Cleveland)	
2014-05-20	Carlos Mejia (44)	Hispanic	California (Salinas)	Officers responded to reports from a resident of Elkington Avenue at 12:14 p.m. that a man, identified as 44-year-old Carlos Mejia, was trying to break into their home and was threatening to kill them, police said. When police arrived, they soon found Mejia walking down Del Monte Avenue holding landscape garden shears, pointing the shears at them and refusing to put the instrument down as the officers, commanded him to do. Mejia backing away down the street lost his footing and fell down. Mejia got up and continued down the street in fear of the officers. The officers attempted to use their Tasers on the suspect to subdue him, but the cartridge from one officer's Taser missed hitting Mejia and the other officer's Taser was found to never have been deployed. The two officers decided to use deadly force on Mejia to prevent him from possibly harming people inside a bakery as he approached the entrance to the business at the corner of Del Monte and Sanborn. Mejias body lay in the street for over three hours, as neighborhood children passed on their way home from school.
2014-05-19	Curtis E. Welford (25)	White	Mississippi (Forest)	
2014-05-19	Kenneth Shawn Todd (41)	Unknown race	North Carolina (Macclesfield)	
2014-05-19	Robert Sharp (56)	White	Florida (Masaryktown)	
2014-05-19	Osbourne Broadie (39)	Black	New York (New York)	
2014-05-19	Luis Arturo Hernandez Jr. (37)	Hispanic	Maryland (Bel Air)	
2014-05-18	Juvon Allen (21)	Black	Arkansas (Little Rock)	
2014-05-18	Sheila Vawter (44)	White	Texas (San Antonio)	
2014-05-18	Thomas N. Saunders (47)	White	Virginia (Pearisburg)	
2014-05-18	Cory Lee Bush (24)	White	California (Oroville)	
2014-05-18	Ashley DiPiazza (26)	White	Wisconsin (Madison)	Officers were called to the apartment at 1:20 am for a domestic disturbance and found DiPiazza with a loaded handgun to her head. They spoke with her for about 30 minutes but she refused to put the gun down. When she was deemed a threat to officers, she was fatally shot. The shooting was later ruled justified by the district attorney, and the department says Officers Justin Bailey and Gary Pihlaja did not violate department policy.
2014-05-17	Danny Christian Molina (34)	Hispanic	California (Los Angeles)	
2014-05-17	Charles Jameson (30)	White	Wisconsin (Plover)	
2014-05-16	Joseph Lambert Livers III (38)	White	Kentucky (Campbellsville)	
2014-05-16	Scott Kato (45)	Black	New York (New York)	
2014-05-16	Justin Sean Tucker (36)	White	Florida (Clearwater)	
2014-05-16	Charles D. Broadway Jr. (24)	Black	Kansas (Kansas City)	
2014-05-16	Bruce Robinson (47)	Unknown race	Louisiana (Metairie)	
2014-05-15	Valeri Hawkins (57)	White	California (Concord)	
2014-05-15	Patrick Gerome Tillery (43)	White	Florida (New Port Richey)	
2014-05-15	Nicolas Foster (29)	White	Massachusetts (Salisbury)	
2014-05-14	Joshua Powell (22)	Hispanic	Texas (Wichita Falls)	
2014-05-13	David James Barclay (41)	White	Florida (Dunelion)	
2014-05-13	Tracey Liniger (50)	White	Missouri (Springfield)	
2014-05-12	James Renee White Jr. (21)	Black	California (Universal City)	At 1:15 am, Los Angeles Police Department officers from the North Hollywood Division responded to a report of a group disturbance at the Infusion Lounge nightclub at Universal CityWalk near the Universal Studios Hollywood theme park. When the officers arrived, shots rang out within the crowd, and began to take cover. The suspect, James R. White Jr., came out of the club with a gun, who was promptly shot and killed by the officers. Three civilians sustained minor injuries, but while trying to flee the scene and not from gunfire.
2014-05-12	Tommy Jackson (39)	Black	Florida (Tallahassee)	Police also shot another man, Arthur James (40), in the jaw. Jackson was shot eight times. Both men were fleeing on foot after a robbery.
2014-05-12	Michael Clayton McNeil (39)	White	Alabama (Ashford)	
2014-05-11	Ron Hillstrom (44)	White	Washington (University Place)	
2014-05-11	Victor Luis Arenas (25)	Hispanic	Arizona (Eloy)	
2014-05-11	Tommy J. Yancy Jr. (32)	Black	California (Imperial)	
2014-05-11	Gary Smith (37)	Black	Illinois (Chicago)	
2014-05-10	Shane E. Gumm (36)	Unknown race	West Virginia (Hinton)	
2014-05-10	Joseph Givens (34)	Black	Ohio (Columbus)	
2014-05-10	Neil Wayne Saylor (50)	White	Kentucky (Hazard)	
2014-05-10	Jonathan Lee Asuzu (32)	Black	Alabama (Birmingham)	
2014-05-10	Jose Raul Herrera (59)	Hispanic	California (Ontario)	
2014-05-09	Jacklynn Rashaun Ford (25)	White	Oregon (Salem)	After Ford fled a traffic stop, officer Trevor Morrison pursued and fatally shot her in the head and chest.
2014-05-09	Osman Hernandez (26)	Hispanic	California (Salinas)	911 callers told emergency dispatchers that Hernandez was walking around a crowded shopping center with a knife. Business owners barricaded themselves inside their shops. The fieldworker had walked to the shopping center from a nearby bar. The first officer on scene saw Hernandez was acting bizarrely. Surveillance video showed Hernandez wildly swinging his knife around in the air dancing a Mexican folk dance. He was followed by police to the parking lot. While Hernandez was handcuffed and on the ground a police officer shot him.
2014-05-09	Devante Kyshon Hinds (21)	Black	Alabama (Birmingham)	
2014-05-08	Jose Rodriquez-Moncada (24)	Hispanic	Idaho (Payette)	
2014-05-08	James "Jim" Palmer (69)	White	Florida (Brooksville)	
2014-05-08	Thomas Ornelas (41)	Hispanic	Colorado (Dotsero)	
2014-05-08	Arcenio Lujan (48)	Hispanic	New Mexico (Las Vegas)	
2014-05-08	Howard Wallace Bowe Jr. (34)	Black	Florida (Hallandale Beach)	
2014-05-07	Arnesto Ramos (30)	Hispanic	Texas (Lubbock)	
2014-05-07	Dominique Franklin Jr. (23)	Black	Illinois (Chicago)	
2014-05-07	George V. King (19)	Black	Maryland (Baltimore)	
2014-05-06	Perlie Golden (93)	Black	Texas (Hearne)	
2014-05-06	Cheyne Russell Pinkney (28)	White	Florida (South Daytona)	
2014-05-06	Christopher George Louk (43)	White	California (Olivehurst)	
2014-05-05	Jerry Wilson Jr. (34)	Black	Texas (Houston)	
2014-05-05	Justin Griffin (25)	Black	Mississippi (Jackson)	
2014-05-04	Oscar Herrera (18)	Hispanic	California (Dublin)	Police came to Oscar Herrera's home responding to a report of Herrera having a mental breakdown and fighting with his mother. Officers encountered Herrera at the front door of his condominium wielding a baseball bat. According to police, Herrera struck an officer in the hand with the bat and tried to swing at him in an upward motion. He was then shot by a police officer.
2014-05-04	Steven Travis Goble (31)	White	Michigan (Orleans)	
2014-05-04	Jonathan Swindle (38)	Black	Texas (Center)	
2014-05-03	Armand Martin (50)	Black	New Mexico (Albuquerque)	
2014-05-02	Eddie Macon Jr. (39)	Black	Michigan (Niles)	
2014-05-02	Brandon Daniel Peters (29)	White	Florida (Jacksonville)	
2014-05-02	Londrell E. Johnson (33)	Black	Wisconsin (Madison)	Officers were responding to an apartment where three people had been stabbed. Officer Carlin Becker and Sgt. Dave McClurg shot Johnson multiple times after he allegedly advanced upon them with a knife. Johnson later died in a hospital. Two of the stabbing victims also died.
2014-05-01	Dean A. Caccamo (50)	White	Wisconsin (Primrose)	Deputies were called to a home midday and found Caccamo's mother and stepfather bleeding from injuries caused by Caccamo, who suffered from schizophrenia. On their way down the stairs, Caccamo used pepper spray on the lead deputy, tried to grab his beanbag shotgun, pulled him down, and stabbed him. A second deputy shot Caccamo, puncturing a lung but not stopping him from stabbing a third deputy; the struggle continued. By the time Caccamo was subdued, it was too late for medical care to effectively save his life; he died inside the home. The district attorney ruled that this use of deadly force was permitted under the law.

== See also ==
- Death in custody § United States
- Henry A. Wallace Police Crime Public Database
- List of cases of police brutality
- List of countries with annual rates and counts for killings by law enforcement officers
- List of law enforcement officers killed in the line of duty in the United States
- List of law enforcement officers convicted for an on-duty killing in the United States
- List of shootings by US immigration agents
- List of police reforms related to the George Floyd protests
- List of unarmed African Americans killed by law enforcement officers in the United States
- Lists of killings by law enforcement officers
- Police brutality in the United States
- Police misconduct § United States
- Police riot § United States
- Police use of deadly force in the United States
