= Kremlin Mill, Missouri =

- Unincorporated community
- Location within Missouri Location within the United States
- Coordinates: 36°37′53″N 90°34′15″W
- Country: United States
- State: Missouri
- County: Butler
- Elevation: 345 ft (105 m)
- Time zone: UTC-6 (Central (CST))
  - Summer (DST): UTC-5 (CDT)
- Area code: 573
- GNIS feature ID: 735295

Kremlin Mill is an unincorporated community in southwest Butler County, in the U.S. state of Missouri.

The mill was on the Little Black River approximately two miles west-southwest of Taft.

== History ==
A post office called Kremlin Mills was in operation from 1878 until 1880, and a post office called Kremlin from 1887 until 1888. The community took its name from a nearby gristmill of the same name which in turn was named after the Moscow Kremlin in Russia.
