= Indian Creek (Black River tributary) =

Stream in the US state of Missouri

Coordinates: 36.8028323°N 90.3751096°W

Indian Creek is a stream in Butler County in the U.S. state of Missouri. It is a tributary of Black River.

Indian Creek most likely was named for the Indians who settled along its course.

== See also ==
- List of rivers of Missouri
