= Halloran, Missouri =

- Unincorporated community
- Location within Missouri Location within the United States
- Coordinates: 36°50′00″N 90°37′05″W
- Country: United States
- State: Missouri
- County: Butler
- Elevation: 456 ft (139 m)
- Time zone: UTC-6 (Central (CST))
  - Summer (DST): UTC-5 (CDT)
- Area code: 573
- GNIS feature ID: 735269

Halloran is an unincorporated community in Butler County, in the U.S. state of Missouri.

== History ==
Halloran's post office was established in 1890 and remained in operation until 1911. The community derives its name from James A. Halloran, a pioneer citizen.
