= Harwell Creek =

Stream in Missouri, United States

Coordinates: 36.8061656°N 90.4031663°W

Harwell Creek is a stream in Butler County in the U.S. state of Missouri.

Harwell Creek was named after Edwin Harwell, the grandfather of an early settler.

== See also ==
- List of rivers of Missouri
