= Parks, Missouri =

Extinct hamlet in Missouri, U.S.

Coordinates: 36°36′50″N 90°33′55″W

Parks is an extinct town in Butler County, in the U.S. state of Missouri. The GNIS classifies it as a populated place.

A post office called Park was established in 1911, and closed in 1915. The community was named after John and Barnes Park, businessmen in the local lumber industry.
