= Empire, Missouri =

- Unincorporated community
- Location within Missouri Location within the United States
- Coordinates: 36°45′48″N 90°18′56″W
- Country: United States
- State: Missouri
- County: Butler
- Elevation: 325 ft (99 m)
- Time zone: UTC-6 (Central (CST))
  - Summer (DST): UTC-5 (CDT)
- Area code: 573
- GNIS feature ID: 739863

Empire is an unincorporated community in Butler County, in the U.S. state of Missouri.

The community took its name from the Empire Lumber Company.
