= Hubbells, Missouri =

- Unincorporated community
- Location within Missouri Location within the United States
- Coordinates: 36°34′03″N 90°33′26″W
- Country: United States
- State: Missouri
- County: Butler
- Elevation: 305 ft (93 m)
- Time zone: UTC-6 (Central (CST))
  - Summer (DST): UTC-5 (CDT)
- Area code: 573
- GNIS feature ID: 740944

Hubbells is an unincorporated community in Butler County, in the U.S. state of Missouri.

The community was named after the proprietor of a local mill.
