= St. Francois Township, Butler County, Missouri =

Township in Missouri, US

Saint Francois Township
- Township
- Coordinates: 36°50′59″N 090°16′52″W
- Country: United States
- State: Missouri
- County: Butler

Area
  - Total: 52.03 sq mi (134.76 km^{2})
  - Land: 51.51 sq mi (133.41 km^{2})
  - Water: 0.52 sq mi (1.35 km^{2}) 1%
- Elevation: 430 ft (131 m)

Population (2010)
  - Total: 1,794
  - Density: 32/sq mi (12.2/km^{2})
- FIPS code: 29-64262
- GNIS feature ID: 0766357

Saint Francois Township is one of ten townships in Butler County, Missouri, US. As of the 2010 census, its population was 1,794.

== Geography ==
Saint Francois Township covers an area of 52.03 square miles (134.8 km^{2}) and contains no incorporated settlements.
