= Agee Creek (Black River tributary) =

Stream in Missouri, U.S.

Agee Creek Tributary to Black River
- Location of Agee Creek mouth

Location
- Country: United States
- State: Missouri
- County: Butler

Physical characteristics
- Source: Pike Creek divide
  - location: about 3 miles north of Poplar Bluff, Missouri
  - coordinates: 36°48′39.00″N 90°27′8.00″W
  - elevation: 470 ft (140 m)
- Mouth: Black River
  - location: about 3 miles northwest of Poplar Bluff, Missouri
  - coordinates: 36°49′52.20″N 90°26′1.40″W
  - elevation: 341 ft (104 m)
- Length: 2.55 mi (4.10 km)
- Basin size: 1.42 square miles (3.7 km^{2})
- Discharge
  - location: Black River
  - average: 1.93 cu ft/s (0.055 m^{3}/s) at mouth with Black River

Basin features
- Progression: Black River → White River → Mississippi River
- River system: Black River
- Bridges: Birdsong Road, Dickerson Lane, County Road 525

Agee Creek is a stream in Butler County, Missouri, USA.

Agee Creek was named after William Agee, a pioneer citizen.

== See also ==
- List of rivers of Missouri
