= Hickory Creek (Black River tributary) =

Stream in Butler County, Missouri

Coordinates: 36.8092211°N 90.3920546°W

Location
- Country: United States
- State: Missouri

Physical characteristics
- Mouth: Black River

Hickory Creek is a stream in Butler County in the U.S. state of Missouri. It is a tributary of the Black River.

Hickory Creek was named for the black hickory timber in the area.

== See also ==
- List of rivers of Missouri
