= Harviell, Missouri =

- Census-designated place & unincorporated community
- Location within Missouri
- Coordinates: 36°39′43″N 90°28′29″W
- Country: United States
- State: Missouri
- County: Butler
- Township: Beaver Dam

Area
  - Total: 1.78 sq mi (4.60 km^{2})
  - Land: 1.76 sq mi (4.57 km^{2})
  - Water: 0.015 sq mi (0.04 km^{2})
- Elevation: 315 ft (96 m)

Population (2020)
  - Total: 98
  - Density: 55.6/sq mi (21.46/km^{2})
- Time zone: UTC-6 (Central (CST))
  - Summer (DST): UTC-5 (CDT)
- ZIP code: 63945
- Area code: 573
- FIPS code: 29-30844
- GNIS feature ID: 2587078

Harviell is an unincorporated community and census-designated place in Butler County, Missouri, United States. As of the 2020 census it had a population of 98.

== History ==
Harviell was founded in 1873 and is named for Simeon Harviell, an early citizen. A post office called Harviell has been in operation since 1874.

== Geography ==
Harviell is located on Missouri Route 158, approximately 10 miles (16 km) southwest of Poplar Bluff.

According to the United States Census Bureau, the CDP has a total area of 1.8 square miles (4.6 km^{2}), of which 0.015 square miles (0.04 km^{2}), or 0.78%, is water.

== Demographics ==
Historical population
Census	Pop.	Note	%±
2020	98		—
U.S. Decennial Census
