= Buck Creek (Black River tributary) =

Stream in the US state of Missouri

Coordinates: 36°49′56″N 90°25′14″W

Buck Creek is a stream in Butler County in the U.S. state of Missouri. It is a tributary of the Black River.

Buck Creek probably was named for the bucks in the area.

== See also ==
- List of rivers of Missouri
