= Stringtown, Butler County, Missouri =

- Unincorporated community
- Location within Missouri Location within the United States
- Coordinates: 36°45′10″N 90°34′58″W
- Country: United States
- State: Missouri
- County: Butler
- Elevation: 486 ft (148 m)
- Time zone: UTC-6 (Central (CST))
  - Summer (DST): UTC-5 (CDT)
- Area code: 573
- GNIS feature ID: 752399

Stringtown is an unincorporated community in Butler County, in the U.S. state of Missouri.

The community is on Missouri Route M one mile east of Beaverdam Creek.

According to tradition, Stringtown was named for the "string" or line of customers to a local bootleg liquor outlet.

On April 3, 2014, an F0 tornado struck Stringtown. A mobile home had about half of its roof removed and a few tree limbs were broken.
