= Batesville, Missouri =

- Unincorporated community
- Location within Missouri Location within the United States
- Coordinates: 36°41′56″N 90°14′46″W
- Country: United States
- State: Missouri
- County: Butler
- Elevation: 322 ft (98 m)
- Time zone: UTC-6 (Central (CST))
  - Summer (DST): UTC-5 (CDT)
- Area code: 573
- GNIS feature ID: 713732

Batesville is an unincorporated community in eastern Butler County, in the U.S. state of Missouri. The community is located in the flatlands of southeast Missouri on Missouri Route 51 between Broseley to the south and Rossville to the north. Poplar Bluff is 8.5 miles (13.7 km) to the northwest.

== History ==
A post office called Batesville was established in 1902 and remained in operation until 1910. The community was named after Horace Bates, owner of the site.

== Notable people ==
- Waverly W. Wray (1919–1944), soldier
