= Twin Rivers R-X School District =

School district in Missouri, U.S.

Address
- 9348 Highway 51 Broseley, Missouri, 63932; United States

District information
- Type: Public
- Grades: PreK–12
- NCES District ID: 2930520

Students and staff
- Students: 887
- Teachers: 70.95
- Staff: 65.45
- Student–teacher ratio: 12.5

Other information
- Website: www.tr10.us

Twin Rivers R-X School District (Twin Rivers R-10 School District) is a school district headquartered in Broseley in unincorporated Butler County, Missouri. It was created in 1969 through the consolidation of the Fisk-Rombauer School District, Broseley School District, and Qulin School District. The Senior Class of 1970 decided on the name of the district, its mascot (The Royals), school colors of royal blue and white, the yearbook "The Royal Shield", and the newspaper, "The Royal Scepter".

It operates three schools: Twin Rivers High School in Broseley, Fisk School in Fisk, and Qulin School in Qulin.
