= Waverly W. Wray =

American soldier (1919–1944)

- Born: Waverly Wright Wray; September 27, 1919; Batesville, Missouri, US
- Died: September 21, 1944 (aged 24); Nijmegen, the Netherlands
- Cause of death: Gunshot
- Military career
- Allegiance: United States
- Branch: Army
- Service years: 1942–1944
- Rank: First lieutenant
- Nickname: "Deacon"
- Service number: O-1030110
- Units: 505th Infantry Regiment (2nd Battalion, Company E; Company D)
- Conflicts: World War II; Allied invasion of Italy; Allied invasion of Sicily; Operation Overlord; Operation Market Garden
- Awards: Combat Infantryman Badge; Distinguished Service Cross; Military Order of William; Purple Heart; Silver Star

Waverly Wright Wray (September 27, 1919 – September 21, 1944) was an American soldier who was killed in action during World War II. A paratrooper, he fought in Italy and France, including Operation Overlord, during which he served as the de facto commander of his company after his was injured. He killed more than a dozen soldiers.

== Early life and military training ==
Wray was born on September 27, 1919, in Batesville, Missouri, to Jesse and Eva Wray. Raised in Tocowa, Mississippi, he hunted throughout his childhood, and originally planned to pursue a career in either logging or ministry.

Wray volunteered into the Army after the United States entered World War II. He volunteered three times: for service, for infantry, then for an Airborne Corps. He was trained in parachuting at Fort Benning, and in 1942 was assigned to Company E, 2nd Battalion, 505th Infantry Regiment, an airborne infantry unit. He weighed 250 pounds (110 kg), had a "soft face", and "legs like tree trunks". His parachute was too small for his size, though he was never issued a larger one due to his legs being assumed to resist injury. He was well-liked by his regiment and was nicknamed "Deacon", being a devout Baptist. He otherwise went by "Charlie", which was how he introduced himself. As a Baptist, he refrained from alcohol and nicotine, avoided using profanity, carried a Bible at all times, and donated half of his pay to the construction of a church in his hometown. Instead of profanity, he used the minced oaths "dad-burn" or "John Brown". It was believed that he enlisted as part of his service to God. During a 24-hour 54-mile (87 km) march, he carried the 31-pound (14 kg) light machine guns of two other soldiers for much of the time. He was also a sharpshooter and claimed to have "never missed a shot he hadn't intended to".

== Italy ==
In May 1943, the 505th Infantry Regiment was stationed in North Africa following its recapture. They landed in Sicily in July 1943 via a 400-foot (120 m) parachute jump, which was Wray's first in combat. Despite jumping from below optimal height, he was uninjured. The regiment blocked roads connecting to a beach in Gela. The next morning, they assembled at a seaside fortification.

Following the recapture of Sicily, Wray was reassigned to Company D of the regiment, joining them to fight on the shores of Salerno. He helped retake the Volturno's bridges. He served as an executive officer in Company D.

== Operation Overlord ==
Wray fought in the Operation Overlord landing on June 7, 1944, parachuting with the 3rd Battalion before the Allied landings. He broke his leg from the jump.

Company D fought in the northern end of the city Sainte-Mère-Église; being outnumbered by four German battalions, they were forced to retreat. During the retreat, his commanding officer sustained an injury, which made Wray the de facto commander of the company. He crawled into the German defenses and destroyed two heavy machine guns, killing their crews with grenades and his rifle, a total of fifteen soldiers. After sustaining an injury and running out of ammunition, he crawled back to his company.

Benjamin H. Vandervoort set him on a reconnaissance mission to locate German forces from the east. Wray led the company to a position in a nearby forest, and alone reconnoitered the position of German troops. He discovered eight Germans huddled around a radio; he ordered them to put their hands up, then shot one—who instead tried to draw his pistol—between the eyes. Wray was fired upon by two soldiers in a trench; a bullet ricochet struck his right ear and helmet strap, which might have killed him if it had been a quarter inch (0.6 cm) closer. Wray retreated into a ditch. Ten Germans—all officers of the 1st Battalion of the 91st Infantry Division—encountered the rest of the platoon, giving Wray time to reload his M1 Garand and kill all ten, each with a single shot. He rejoined the company, bringing two prisoners. After returning, he commanded the 1st platoon to fire upon a road, which German forces were attempting to flank their position, with a mortar and machine gun, which caused the enemy to flee northward; a second battalion was also forced to retreat, as their flank became exposed. Vandervoort recalled that after Wray reported back to him, he asked if the German soldiers were "getting close to him". Wray replied, "not as close as ah've been getting to them, Suh".

== Death and awards ==
Wray parachuted into the Netherlands in Operation Market Garden, his fourth jump into combat. His company attacked Nijmegen and advanced toward Waalbrug, a bridge spanning the Waal. When they had advanced within 200 yards (180 m) of the bridge, they were fired upon by machine guns and anti-tank rifles. Wray was ordered to lead a counterattack on the far side of the bridge. He took a bazooka squad, a machine gun, platoon commander, and a rifle squad, which opened fire while too far from the bridge. As Wray led his men into effective range, he and another soldier were shot by a sniper. Wray was hit in the face and killed. He died on September 21, 1944, aged 24, and is buried in Shiloh Cemetery.

Wray was described as a fierce fighter, having "an air of near invincibility around him". Vandervoort called him the "World War II equivalent to Alvin York", with Vandervoort nominating him for a posthumous Medal of Honor, which was lowered to a Distinguished Service Cross, awarded on June 7, 1944. The citation reads:

The President of the United States of America, authorized by Act of Congress, July 9, 1918, takes pride in presenting the Distinguished Service Cross (Posthumously) to First Lieutenant (Infantry) Waverly W. Wray (ASN: 0-1030110), United States Army, for extraordinary heroism in connection with military operations against an armed enemy while serving with Company D, 2d Battalion, 505th Parachute Infantry Regiment, 82d Airborne Division, in action against enemy forces on 7 June 1944, in France. While his platoon was engaged in a heavy with the enemy, First Lieutenant Wray, completely disregarding his own safety, crawled under devastating machine gun fire and although wounded, fought on until he had destroyed two enemy machine gun positions. Returning to his platoon he reorganized it and, securing a re-supply of ammunition, led it in a successful attack upon the enemy. Only after he had driven the enemy from his platoon sector did he accept first aid for his wounds. First Lieutenant Wray’s valiant leadership, personal bravery and zealous devotion to duty exemplify the highest traditions of the military forces of the United States and reflect great credit upon himself, the 82d Airborne Division, and the United States Army.

Wray was awarded a Silver Star on September 20, 1944, one day prior to his death. The citation reads:

The President of the United States of America, authorized by Act of Congress July 9, 1918, takes pleasure in presenting the Silver Star to First Lieutenant (Infantry) Waverly W. Wray (ASN: 0-1030110), United States Army, for gallantry in action on 20 September 1944 at ****, Holland. On 20 September 1944, First Lieutenant Wray, Executive Officer of Company D, 2d Battalion, 505th Parachute Infantry Regiment, 82d Airborne Division, advanced with his company in the direction of the railroad bridge at ***, Holland, which spanned the Waal River. The objective of the company was to take and hold this bridge. The company, supported by British tanks and Bren gun carriers came under heavy fire from a concealed enemy position. German SS Troops, armed with automatic weapons and bazookas, were so located that they could fire on the lead tanks and it was necessary that they be eliminated at once. First Lieutenant Wray immediately and on his own initiative, formed a squad of men and personally led them in a vicious and successful attack on the enemy position. In this action he received severe wounds, but continued to lead his men until the enemy was eliminated. Through great initiative and personal courage, First Lieutenant Wray successfully removed an obstacle which seriously endangered the success of the entire battalion mission. Due to his gallant leadership the bridge over the Waal River was captured intact with reduced casualties. First Lieutenant Wray died from the wounds received in this engagement. His exemplary courage was typical of the outstanding performance achieved by this officer in every action in which he fought. His gallant actions and dedicated devotion to duty, without regard for his own life, were in keeping with the highest traditions of military service and reflect great credit upon himself and the United States Army.

Wray was also awarded the American Campaign Medal, the Army Good Conduct Medal, the Combat Infantryman Badge, the Presidential Unit Citation, the Purple Heart, the Military Order of William, and the World War II Victory Medal. Vandervoort sent the newspaper of Wray's hometown, The Batesville Panolian, some of his writings while serving. In January 2011, House Bill 1881 and Senate Bill 2831 were introduced to the Mississippi Legislature, which would have renamed a portion of Mississippi Highway 6 – which Wray was raised near – to the "Waverly Wray Memorial Highway". In 2022, he was inducted into the 82nd Airborne Division Hall of Fame.
