= Carola, Missouri =

- Unincorporated community
- Location within Missouri Location within the United States
- Coordinates: 36°33′06″N 90°20′09″W
- Country: United States
- State: Missouri
- County: Butler
- Elevation: 315 ft (96 m)
- Time zone: UTC-6 (Central (CST))
  - Summer (DST): UTC-5 (CDT)
- Area code: 573
- GNIS feature ID: 740723

Carola is an unincorporated community in southeastern Butler County, in the U.S. state of Missouri.

The community is on Missouri Route N 2.5 miles (4.0 km) southwest of Oglesville; the Missouri-Arkansas border is approximately 3.5 miles (5.6 km) to the south. The Black River flows past the west side of the community.

== History ==
A post office called Carola was established in 1882 and remained in operation until 1913. The community was named after a boat belonging to a group of German first settlers.
