= Ash Hill Township, Butler County, Missouri =

Township in the US state of Missouri

Ash Hill Township
- Township
- Coordinates: 36°40′16″N 090°15′05″W
- Country: United States
- State: Missouri
- County: Butler

Area
  - Total: 131.16 sq mi (339.69 km^{2})
  - Land: 130.88 sq mi (338.98 km^{2})
  - Water: 0.27 sq mi (0.7 km^{2}) 0.21%
- Elevation: 322 ft (98 m)

Population (2010)
  - Total: 3,349
  - Density: 27/sq mi (10.4/km^{2})
- FIPS code: 29-02224
- GNIS feature ID: 0766348

Ash Hill Township is one of ten townships in Butler County, Missouri, USA. As of the 2010 census, its population was 3,349.

== Geography ==
Ash Hill Township covers an area of 131.15 square miles (339.7 km^{2}) and contains two incorporated settlements: Fisk and Qulin. It contains six cemeteries: Ash Hills, Browns, Hillis, Kelly, Qulin and Vale.

The streams of Blue Spring Slough, Catherine Slough, Cross Slough, Dan River, Lake Slough, Menorkenut Slough Number 16 and Menorkenut Slough Number 19 run through this township.
