= Epps Township, Butler County, Missouri =

Township in the US state of Missouri

Epps Township
- Township
- Coordinates: 36°48′38″N 090°33′07″W
- Country: United States
- State: Missouri
- County: Butler

Area
  - Total: 53.84 sq mi (139.45 km^{2})
  - Land: 53.79 sq mi (139.31 km^{2})
  - Water: 0.054 sq mi (0.14 km^{2}) 0.1%
- Elevation: 466 ft (142 m)

Population (2010)
  - Total: 3,171
  - Density: 48/sq mi (18.6/km^{2})
- FIPS code: 29-22492
- GNIS feature ID: 0766353

Epps Township is one of ten townships in Butler County, Missouri, USA. As of the 2010 census, its population was 3,171.

Epps Township was established in 1850, and named after Obadiah Epps, an early settler.

== Geography ==
Epps Township covers an area of 53.84 square miles (139.4 km^{2}) and contains no incorporated settlements. It contains three cemeteries: Houts, Kearbey (Kearbey Chapel Cemetery) and Sparkman.

The streams of Beehole Branch, Camp Branch, Crooked Branch, Goose Creek, Harmon Branch, Hurricane Creek, Procter Branch and Ten Mile Creek run through this township.
