= Holcomb, Missouri =

- City
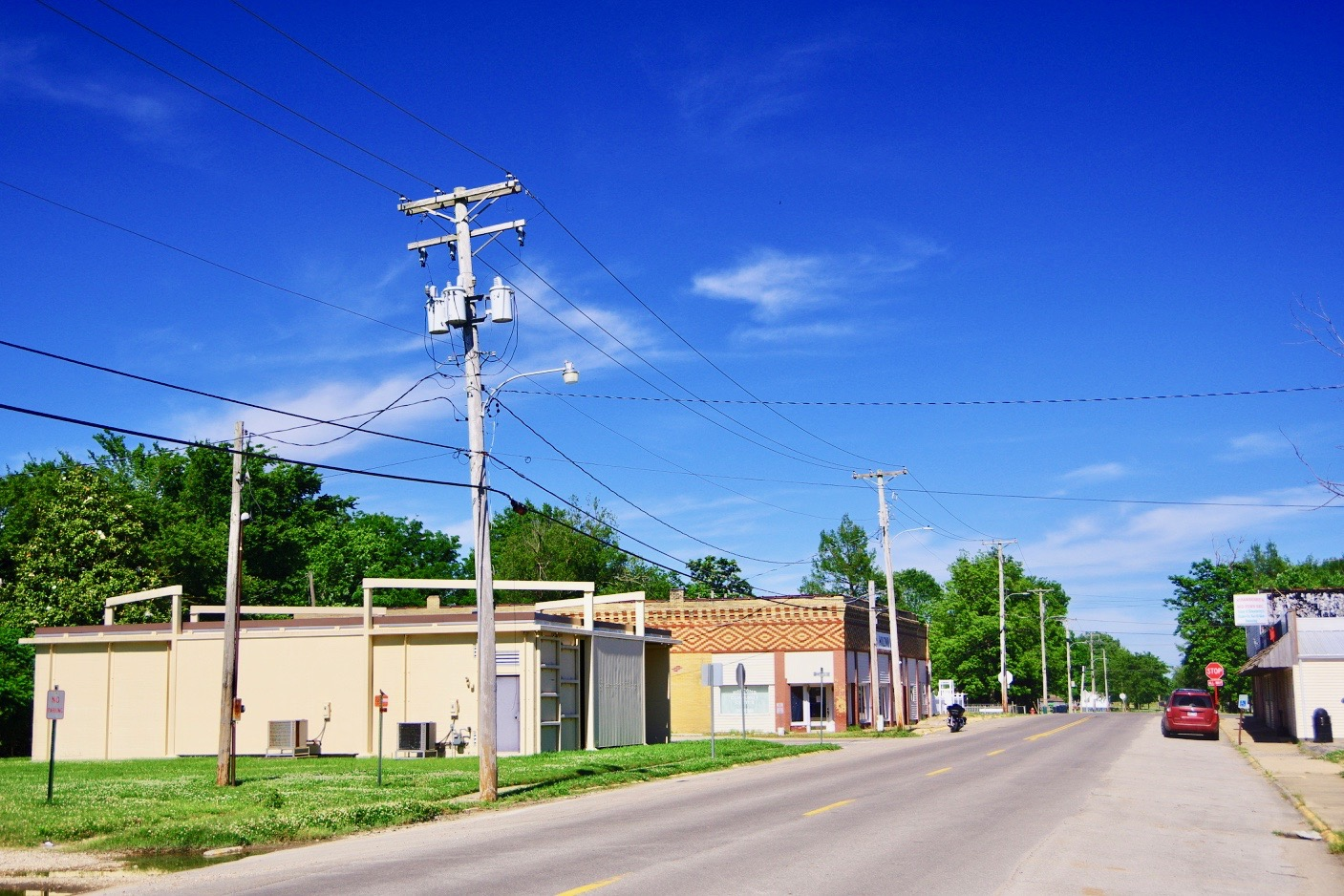
- Main Street

- Location of Holcomb, Missouri
- Coordinates: 36°24′5″N 90°1′29″W
- Country: United States
- State: Missouri
- County: Dunklin

Area
  - Total: 0.58 sq mi (1.51 km^{2})
  - Land: 0.58 sq mi (1.51 km^{2})
  - Water: 0 sq mi (0.00 km^{2})
- Elevation: 276 ft (84 m)

Population (2020)
  - Total: 642
  - Density: 1,101.3/sq mi (425.21/km^{2})
- Time zone: UTC-6 (Central (CST))
  - Summer (DST): UTC-5 (CDT)
- ZIP code: 63852
- Area code: 573
- FIPS code: 29-32536
- GNIS feature ID: 2394396

Holcomb /ˈhɔːkəm/ HAW-kəm is a city in Dunklin County, Missouri, United States. The population was 642 at the 2020 census.

== History ==
A post office called Holcomb has been in operation since 1882. The community has the name of Lewis Holcomb, a county sheriff.

== Geography ==
Holcomb is located at 36°24′05″N 90°01′29″W (36.4013424, -90.0248383). The city lies at the intersection of Missouri Route 25 and Missouri Route 53 in the western Bootheel. The St. Francis River and the Missouri-Arkansas state line pass just to the west.

According to the United States Census Bureau, the city has a total area of 0.58 square miles (1.50 km^{2}), all land.

== Demographics ==
Historical population
Census	Pop.	Note	%±
1900	189		—
1910	279		47.6%
1920	358		28.3%
1930	347		−3.1%
1940	388		11.8%
1950	505		30.2%
1960	436		−13.7%
1970	593		36.0%
1980	632		6.6%
1990	531		−16.0%
2000	696		31.1%
2010	635		−8.8%
2020	642		1.1%
U.S. Decennial Census

=== 2010 census ===
As of the census of 2010, there were 635 people, 248 households, and 173 families living in the city. The population density was 1,094.8 inhabitants per square mile (422.7/km^{2}). There were 279 housing units at an average density of 481.0 per square mile (185.7/km^{2}). The racial makeup of the city was 95.59% White, 1.73% Black or African American, 2.20% from other races, and 0.47% from two or more races. Hispanic or Latino of any race were 4.09% of the population.

There were 248 households, of which 40.3% had children under the age of 18 living with them, 50.0% were married couples living together, 16.1% had a female householder with no husband present, 3.6% had a male householder with no wife present, and 30.2% were non-families. 27.4% of all households were made up of individuals, and 13.7% had someone living alone who was 65 years of age or older. The average household size was 2.56 and the average family size was 3.10.

The median age in the city was 35.5 years. 29.8% of residents were under the age of 18; 6.8% were between the ages of 18 and 24; 22.9% were from 25 to 44; 25.1% were from 45 to 64; and 15.4% were 65 years of age or older. The gender makeup of the city was 47.7% male and 52.3% female.

=== 2000 census ===
As of the census of 2000, there were 696 people, 280 households, and 194 families living in the city. The population density was 1,140.1 inhabitants per square mile (440.2/km^{2}). There were 302 housing units at an average density of 494.7 per square mile (191.0/km^{2}). The racial makeup of the city was 96.26% White, 0.43% African American, 0.43% Native American, 1.01% from other races, and 1.87% from two or more races. Hispanic or Latino of any race were 1.15% of the population.

There were 280 households, out of which 34.3% had children under the age of 18 living with them, 55.7% were married couples living together, 10.0% had a female householder with no husband present, and 30.4% were non-families. 26.8% of all households were made up of individuals, and 15.0% had someone living alone who was 65 years of age or older. The average household size was 2.49 and the average family size was 2.97.

In the city the population was spread out, with 27.2% under the age of 18, 8.3% from 18 to 24, 26.7% from 25 to 44, 21.8% from 45 to 64, and 15.9% who were 65 years of age or older. The median age was 38 years. For every 100 females, there were 93.9 males. For every 100 females age 18 and over, there were 88.5 males.

The median household income was $25,163, and the median income for a family was $29,219. Males had a median income of $24,479 versus $18,462 for females. The per capita income for the city was $11,699. About 14.6% of families and 20.1% of the population were below the poverty line, including 24.1% of those under age 18 and 12.3% of those age 65 or over.

== Education ==
Holcomb R-III School District, which covers the municipality, operates one elementary school and Holcomb High School.

Holcomb has a public library, a branch of the Dunklin County Library.

== Notable people ==
- Tommy Lynn Sells, American Serial Killer
- Jack Powell, American baseball player
