= Dry Branch (Cypress Creek tributary) =

Stream in the American state of Missouri

Coordinates: 36.6347797°N 90.6840068°W

Dry Branch is a stream in Ripley County in the U.S. state of Missouri. It is a tributary of Cypress Creek.

Dry Branch was named for the fact it often runs dry.

== See also ==
- List of rivers of Missouri
