= Cope Branch =

Stream in Missouri, US

Coordinates: 36.6325570°N 90.5784481°W

Cope Branch is a stream in the U.S. state of Missouri. It is a tributary of the Little Black River.

Cope Branch has the name of Sandy Cope, an early settler.

== See also ==
- List of rivers of Missouri
