= Ash Hill, California =

Unincorporated community in California, United States

Ash Hill
- Ghost Town
- Location in California
- Coordinates: 34°42′25″N 116°3′18″W
- Country: United States
- State: California
- County: San Bernardino
- Elevation: 1,942 ft (592 m)
- Time zone: UTC−8 (Pacific Time Zone)
  - Summer (DST): UTC−7 (PDT)
- Area codes: 442/760
- GNIS feature ID: 1660273

Ash Hill is a ghost town in San Bernardino County, in the U.S. state of California. Afton, Amboy, Bagdad, Cadiz, Cadiz Summit, Lavic, Glasgow and Kelso are the nearby communities. Ash Hill is named for Southern Pacific surveyor Benjamin Ash who died in the area from dehydration, it is also possible it could be named for the surrounding dark brown and grey hills. Ash Hill is a part of a chain of ghost towns in San Bernardino County along Interstate 40 and Route 66, the area includes Daggett, Lavic, Klondike, Argos and Ludlow.
