= Coon Island Township, Butler County, Missouri =

Township in the US state of Missouri

Coon Island Township
- Township
- Coordinates: 36°33′04″N 090°23′56″W
- Country: United States
- State: Missouri
- County: Butler

Area
  - Total: 38.19 sq mi (98.91 km^{2})
  - Land: 38.17 sq mi (98.87 km^{2})
  - Water: 0.012 sq mi (0.03 km^{2}) 0.03%
- Elevation: 299 ft (91 m)

Population (2010)
  - Total: 187
  - Density: 5.7/sq mi (2.2/km^{2})
- FIPS code: 29-16264
- GNIS feature ID: 0766352

Coon Island Township is one of ten townships in Butler County, Missouri, USA. As of the 2010 census, its population was 187.

== Geography ==
Coon Island Township covers an area of 38.19 square miles (98.9 km^{2}) and contains no incorporated settlements. It contains one cemetery, Coon Island.

Allred Lake is within this township. The streams of Big Hunting Slough, Caney Slough and Little Hunting Slough run through this township.
