= Junland, Missouri =

- Unincorporated community
- Location within Missouri Location within the United States
- Coordinates: 36°46′07″N 90°16′51″W
- Country: United States
- State: Missouri
- County: Butler
- Elevation: 325 ft (99 m)
- Time zone: UTC-6 (Central (CST))
  - Summer (DST): UTC-5 (CDT)
- Area code: 573
- GNIS feature ID: 750553

Junland is an unincorporated community in Butler County in the U.S. state of Missouri.

Junland is located at the junction of Missouri routes B (old Route 60) and Z, five miles east of Poplar Bluff. It was a station on the Missouri Pacific Railroad.

The name Junland is a shortened alteration of "jungleland," descriptive of the condition of the original town site.

On January 29, 2013, an EF2 tornado struck Junland. The storm leveled a small, older, poorly constructed home, destroyed a mobile home, and blew over several small structures. Many trees were also snapped along the path.
