= Gillis Bluff Township, Butler County, Missouri =

Township in the US state of Missouri

Gillis Bluff Township
- Township
- Coordinates: 36°33′14″N 090°16′21″W
- Country: United States
- State: Missouri
- County: Butler

Area
  - Total: 54.69 sq mi (141.65 km^{2})
  - Land: 54.55 sq mi (141.29 km^{2})
  - Water: 0.14 sq mi (0.36 km^{2}) 0.25%
- Elevation: 299 ft (91 m)

Population (2010)
  - Total: 683
  - Density: 14/sq mi (5.4/km^{2})
- FIPS code: 29-27046
- GNIS feature ID: 0766354

Gillis Bluff Township is one of ten townships in Butler County, Missouri, USA. As of the 2010 census, its population was 683.

== Geography ==
Gillis Bluff Township covers an area of 54.69 square miles (141.6 km^{2}) and contains no incorporated settlements. It contains one cemetery, Carola.
