= Fagus, Missouri =

- Unincorporated community
- Position in Missouri Fagus, Missouri (the United States)
- Coordinates: 36°30′40″N 90°16′01″W
- Country: United States
- State: Missouri
- County: Butler
- Elevation: 308 ft (94 m)
- Time zone: UTC-6 (Central (CST))
  - Summer (DST): UTC-5 (CDT)
- Zip code: 63938
- GNIS feature ID: 735609

Fagus is an unincorporated community in southeastern Butler County, Missouri, United States.

== History ==
A post office called Fagus was established in 1913 and remained in operation until 1973. The community was founded by lumberman William N. Barron and named after the Latin word for "beech tree".

The Big Inch had a station in Fagus.

== Geography ==
Fagus is located on Missouri Route 51, approximately 18 miles southeast of Poplar Bluff and one mile north of the Arkansas state line.
