= Taft, Missouri =

- Unincorporated community
- Location within Missouri Location within the United States
- Coordinates: 36°38′06″N 90°32′16″W
- Country: United States
- State: Missouri
- County: Butler
- Elevation: 312 ft (95 m)
- Time zone: UTC-6 (Central (CST))
  - Summer (DST): UTC-5 (CDT)
- Area code: 573
- GNIS feature ID: 741311

Taft is an unincorporated community in Butler County, in the U.S. state of Missouri.

== History ==
A post office called Taft was established in 1904 and remained in operation until 1927. The community was named after William Howard Taft.
