= Kinzer, Missouri =

- Unincorporated community
- Location within Missouri Location within the United States
- Coordinates: 36°45′37″N 90°20′02″W
- Country: United States
- State: Missouri
- County: Butler
- Elevation: 331 ft (101 m)
- Time zone: UTC-6 (Central (CST))
  - Summer (DST): UTC-5 (CDT)
- Area code: 573
- GNIS feature ID: 739860

Kinzer is an unincorporated community in Butler County, in the U.S. state of Missouri.

The community was just south of Missouri Route B (old Route 60) three miles east of Poplar Bluff and was a station on the Missouri Pacific Railroad.

Kinzer was named after Isaac Kinzer, a businessperson in the local lumber industry.
