= Qulin, Missouri =

- City
- Interactive map of Qulin, Missouri
- Coordinates: 36°35′45″N 90°14′48″W
- Country: United States
- State: Missouri
- County: Butler

Area
  - Total: 0.45 sq mi (1.17 km^{2})
  - Land: 0.45 sq mi (1.17 km^{2})
  - Water: 0 sq mi (0.00 km^{2})
- Elevation: 315 ft (96 m)

Population (2020)
  - Total: 460
  - Density: 1,020.7/sq mi (394.09/km^{2})
- Time zone: UTC-6 (Central (CST))
  - Summer (DST): UTC-5 (CDT)
- ZIP codes: 63938, 63961
- Area code: 573
- FIPS code: 29-60428
- GNIS feature ID: 2396303

Qulin /ˈkjuːlɪn/ KEW-lin is a city located in Butler County in Southeast Missouri, United States. The population was 460 at the 2020 census.

Qulin is included within the Poplar Bluff Metropolitan Statistical Area.

== History ==
A post office called Qulin has been in operation since 1881. The origin of the name Qulin is obscure. Qulin has been declared the "most difficult to pronounce" place name in the state of Missouri by Reader's Digest.

== Geography ==
Qulin is located in southeastern Butler County at the intersection of Missouri Route 51 and Missouri Route 53. It is 13 miles southeast of Poplar Bluff. It is in the flatlands of southeast Missouri with the Black River two miles to the west and the St. Francis River two miles to the east. The Missouri-Arkansas border is six miles south.

According to the United States Census Bureau, the city has a total area of 0.45 square miles (1.17 km^{2}), all land.

== Demographics ==
Historical population
Census	Pop.	Note	%±
1930	236		—
1940	357		51.3%
1950	426		19.3%
1960	587		37.8%
1970	496		−15.5%
1980	545		9.9%
1990	384		−29.5%
2000	467		21.6%
2010	458		−1.9%
2020	460		0.4%
U.S. Decennial Census

=== 2010 census ===
As of the census of 2010, there were 458 people, 202 households, and 113 families residing in the city. The population density was 1,017.8 inhabitants per square mile (393.0/km^{2}). There were 244 housing units at an average density of 542.2 units per square mile (209.3 units/km^{2}). The racial makeup of the city was 97.16% White, 0.66% Native American, 0.22% from other races, and 1.97% from two or more races. Hispanic or Latino of any race were 1.09% of the population.

There were 202 households, of which 26.2% had children under the age of 18 living with them, 35.1% were married couples living together, 16.8% had a female householder with no husband present, 4.0% had a male householder with no wife present, and 44.1% were non-families. 37.6% of all households were made up of individuals, and 18.3% had someone living alone who was 65 years of age or older. The average household size was 2.24 and the average family size was 3.01.

The median age in the city was 44 years. 22.9% of residents were under the age of 18; 6.7% were between the ages of 18 and 24; 22.3% were from 25 to 44; 31.1% were from 45 to 64; and 17.2% were 65 years of age or older. The gender makeup of the city was 46.7% male and 53.3% female.

=== 2000 census ===
As of the census of 2000, there were 467 people, 210 households, and 120 families residing in the city. The population density was 1,047.2 inhabitants per square mile (404.3/km^{2}). There were 232 housing units at an average density of 520.3 units per square mile (200.9 units/km^{2}). The racial makeup of the city was 98.50% White, 0.43% African American, and 1.07% from two or more races. Hispanic or Latino of any race were 0.21% of the population.

There were 210 households, out of which 25.2% had children under the age of 18 living with them, 41.9% were married couples living together, 13.3% had a female householder with no husband present, and 42.4% were non-families. 40.5% of all households were made up of individuals, and 23.3% had someone living alone who was 65 years of age or older. The average household size was 2.20 and the average family size was 2.98.

In the city the population was spread out, with 25.1% under the age of 18, 5.1% from 18 to 24, 25.3% from 25 to 44, 23.8% from 45 to 64, and 20.8% who were 65 years of age or older. The median age was 40 years. For every 100 females, there were 91.4 males. For every 100 females age 18 and over, there were 85.2 males.

The median income for a household in the city was $15,714, and the median income for a family was $19,250. Males had a median income of $21,000 versus $15,481 for females. The per capita income for the city was $9,594. About 24.8% of families and 28.1% of the population were below the poverty line, including 30.3% of those under age 18 and 34.2% of those age 65 or over.

== Climate ==
Climate is characterized by relatively high temperatures and evenly distributed precipitation throughout the year. The Köppen Climate Classification subtype for this climate is "Cfa" (Humid Subtropical Climate).

== Education ==
Twin Rivers R-X School District serves the community and operates the Qulin School as well as Twin Rivers High School in Broseley.
