= Broseley, Missouri =

- Census-Designated Place
- Interactive map of Broseley, Missouri
- Coordinates: 36°40′31″N 90°14′39″W
- Country: United States
- State: Missouri
- County: Butler

Area
  - Total: 0.52 sq mi (1.34 km^{2})
  - Land: 0.52 sq mi (1.34 km^{2})
  - Water: 0 sq mi (0.00 km^{2})
- Elevation: 318 ft (97 m)

Population (2020)
  - Total: 163
  - Density: 314.6/sq mi (121.46/km^{2})
- FIPS code: 29-08812
- GNIS feature ID: 2806385

Broseley is an unincorporated community in eastern Butler County, Missouri, United States. As of the 2020 census, Broseley had a population of 163. It is located on Missouri Route 51, approximately ten miles southeast of Poplar Bluff. Nyssa is two miles to the south and Batesville is two miles to the north.

The community was founded in 1915 by William N. Barron and is named after his wife's hometown of Broseley in England.

Twin Rivers R-X School District serves the community and operates Twin Rivers High School in Broseley.

== Demographics ==
Historical population
Census	Pop.	Note	%±
2020	163		—
U.S. Decennial Census

Broseley first appeared as a census designated place in the 2020 U.S. census.
