= Missouri Route 51 =

State highway in Missouri, U.S.

Route 51

Route information
- Maintained by MoDOT
- Length: 120.811 mi (194.426 km)
- Existed: 1922–present

Major junctions
- South end: AR 139 at the Arkansas state line in Fagus
- Future I-57 / US 60 at Fisk; I-55 at Perryville; US 61 at Perryville
- North end: IL 150 / Great River Road at the Illinois state line in Chester, IL

Location
- Country: United States
- State: Missouri

Highway system
- Missouri State Highway System; Interstate; US; State; Supplemental
← US 50	→ Route 52

Route 51 is a highway in southeastern Missouri. Its northern terminus is the Illinois state line near Chester, Illinois; its southern terminus is at the Arkansas state line northwest of Piggott, Arkansas. It continues into Illinois as Illinois Route 150 and it continues into Arkansas as Highway 139.

Route 51 is one of the original 1922 state highways and ran from the Mississippi River to Advance.

Route 51A, a branch route, formerly connected Route 51 with Puxico when Route 51 ended at Advance (at Route 25). Route 51A would become part of the main highway when it was re-routed and extended.

== Major intersections ==
County	Location	mi	km	Destinations	Notes
Butler	Gillis Bluff Township	0.000	0.000	AR 139 south – Pollard	Continuation into Arkansas
Butler	Qulin	7.354	11.835	Route 53 south – Campbell	Southern end of Route 53 overlap
Butler	Ash Hill Township	10.318	16.605	Route 53 north – Poplar Bluff	Northern end of Route 53 overlap
Stoddard	Duck Creek Township	25.713	41.381	US 60 (Future I-57) – Poplar Bluff, Sikeston	
Bollinger	Liberty Township	61.820	99.490	Route 91 south – Advance	
Bollinger	Marble Hill	71.679	115.356	Route 34 west (First Street)	Western end of Route 34 overlap
Bollinger	Marble Hill	72.179	116.161	Route 34 east – Jackson	Eastern end of Route 34 overlap
Bollinger	Union Township	90.011	144.859	Route 72 – Millersville, Fredericktown	
Perry	Perryville	106.127	170.795	I-55 – Cape Girardeau, St. Louis	
Perry	Perryville	108.829	175.143	US 61 (Kingshighway) – Longtown, St. Mary	
Mississippi River		120.811	194.426	Chester Bridge; Missouri–Illinois state line	
Mississippi River		120.811	194.426	IL 150 east – Chester	Continuation into Illinois
1.000 mi = 1.609 km; 1.000 km = 0.621 mi: Concurrency terminus
