= Fisk, Missouri =

City in Butler County, Missouri, United States

- City
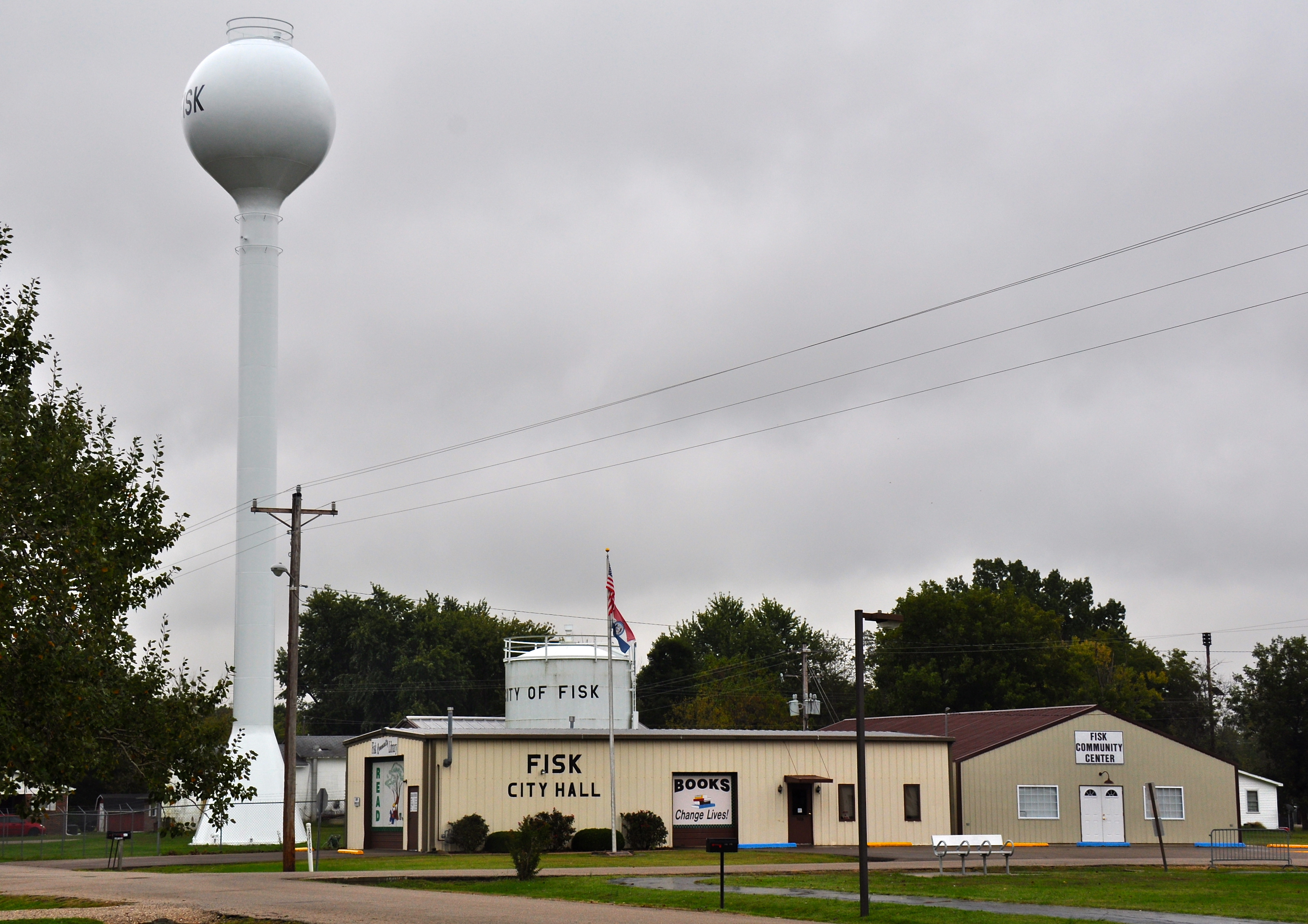
- City Hall of Fisk, October 2014.
- Interactive map of Fisk, Missouri
- Coordinates: 36°46′58″N 90°12′27″W
- Country: United States
- State: Missouri
- County: Butler

Government
  - Mayor: John B. Murray

Area
  - Total: 0.33 sq mi (0.85 km^{2})
  - Land: 0.32 sq mi (0.84 km^{2})
  - Water: 0.0039 sq mi (0.01 km^{2})
- Elevation: 328 ft (100 m)

Population (2020)
  - Total: 312
  - Density: 963.9/sq mi (372.15/km^{2})
- Time zone: UTC-6 (Central (CST))
  - Summer (DST): UTC-5 (CDT)
- ZIP code: 63940
- Area code: 573
- FIPS code: 29-24328
- GNIS feature ID: 2394768

Fisk is a small city in Butler County, Missouri, United States. It is located right along the Butler-Stoddard County line on U.S. Route 60, along the St. Francis River. The population was 312 at the 2020 census.

Fisk is included within the Poplar Bluff Micropolitan Statistical Area.

== History ==
A post office called Fisk has been in operation since 1899. The community was named after Samuel J. Fisk, the proprietor of a local sawmill.

== Demographics ==
Historical population
Census	Pop.	Note	%±
1920	466		—
1930	387		−17.0%
1940	386		−0.3%
1950	542		40.4%
1960	498		−8.1%
1970	503		1.0%
1980	450		−10.5%
1990	422		−6.2%
2000	363		−14.0%
2010	342		−5.8%
2020	312		−8.8%
U.S. Decennial Census

=== 2010 census ===
As of the census of 2010, there were 342 people, 163 households, and 88 families residing in the city. The population density was 1,068.8 inhabitants per square mile (412.7/km^{2}). There were 180 housing units at an average density of 562.5 per square mile (217.2/km^{2}). The racial makeup of the city was 99.42% White and 0.58% from two or more races. Hispanic or Latino of any race were 0.29% of the population.

There were 163 households, of which 25.8% had children under the age of 18 living with them, 36.8% were married couples living together, 14.1% had a female householder with no husband present, 3.1% had a male householder with no wife present, and 46.0% were non-families. 40.5% of all households were made up of individuals, and 17.2% had someone living alone who was 65 years of age or older. The average household size was 2.10 and the average family size was 2.80.

The median age in the city was 46 years. 19.9% of residents were under the age of 18; 6.6% were between the ages of 18 and 24; 21.9% were from 25 to 44; 32.7% were from 45 to 64; and 18.7% were 65 years of age or older. The gender makeup of the city was 47.1% male and 52.9% female.

=== 2000 census ===
As of the census of 2000, there were 363 people, 169 households, and 102 families residing in the city. The population density was 1,099.8 inhabitants per square mile (424.6/km^{2}). There were 189 housing units at an average density of 572.6 per square mile (221.1/km^{2}). The racial makeup of the city was 98.35% White, 0.83% African American, 0.55% Native American, and 0.28% from two or more races. Hispanic or Latino of any race were 0.83% of the population.

There were 169 households, out of which 25.4% had children under the age of 18 living with them, 42.0% were married couples living together, 14.8% had a female householder with no husband present, and 39.6% were non-families. 35.5% of all households were made up of individuals, and 18.3% had someone living alone who was 65 years of age or older. The average household size was 2.15 and the average family size was 2.80.

In the city, the population was spread out, with 23.7% under the age of 18, 6.1% from 18 to 24, 24.8% from 25 to 44, 24.8% from 45 to 64, and 20.7% who were 65 years of age or older. The median age was 42 years. For every 100 females, there were 80.6 males. For every 100 females age 18 and over, there were 75.3 males.

The median income for a household in the city was $19,886, and the median income for a family was $27,000. Males had a median income of $20,500 versus $16,250 for females. The per capita income for the city was $11,577. About 17.0% of families and 30.7% of the population were below the poverty line, including 53.3% of those under age 18 and 18.6% of those age 65 or over.

== Geography ==
Fisk is located in the flatlands of southeast Missouri on the west bank of the St. Francis River approximately midway between Poplar Bluff and Dexter.

According to the United States Census Bureau, the city has a total area of 0.33 square miles (0.85 km^{2}), of which 0.32 square miles (0.83 km^{2}) is land and 0.01 square miles (0.03 km^{2}) is water.

=== Climate ===
Climate is characterized by relatively high temperatures and evenly distributed precipitation throughout the year. The Köppen Climate Classification subtype for this climate is "Cfa" (Humid Subtropical Climate).

Climate data for Fisk, Missouri
Month	Jan	Feb	Mar	Apr	May	Jun	Jul	Aug	Sep	Oct	Nov	Dec	Year
Mean daily maximum °C (°F)	21 (70)	7 (45)	10 (50)	16 (60)	22 (71)	26 (79)	31 (88)	33 (91)	32 (90)	29 (84)	23 (73)	15 (59)	22 (72)
Mean daily minimum °C (°F)	−4 (25)	−2 (29)	3 (37)	8 (47)	13 (56)	18 (64)	20 (68)	19 (66)	15 (59)	8 (47)	2 (36)	−2 (28)	8 (47)
Average precipitation mm (inches)	91 (3.6)	79 (3.1)	120 (4.7)	120 (4.6)	120 (4.7)	100 (4)	91 (3.6)	89 (3.5)	91 (3.6)	84 (3.3)	100 (4)	99 (3.9)	1,184 (46.6)
Average precipitation days	8	7	9	10	10	8	7	7	7	7	8	8	96
Source: Weatherbase

== Education ==
Twin Rivers R-X School District serves the community and operates the Fisk School as well as Twin Rivers High School in Broseley.

Fisk has a lending library, the Fisk Community Library.

== See also ==
- List of cities in Missouri
