= Neelyville, Missouri =

- City
- Interactive map of Neelyville, Missouri
- Coordinates: 36°33′23″N 90°30′49″W
- Country: United States
- State: Missouri
- County: Butler

Area
  - Total: 1.15 sq mi (2.98 km^{2})
  - Land: 1.15 sq mi (2.98 km^{2})
  - Water: 0 sq mi (0.00 km^{2})
- Elevation: 302 ft (92 m)

Population (2020)
  - Total: 318
  - Density: 277/sq mi (106.8/km^{2})
- Time zone: UTC-6 (Central (CST))
  - Summer (DST): UTC-5 (CDT)
- ZIP code: 63954
- Area code: 573
- FIPS code: 29-51446
- GNIS feature ID: 2395164

Neelyville is a city in Butler County in Southeast Missouri, United States. The population was 318 at the 2020 census.

Neelyville is included within the Poplar Bluff Micropolitan Statistical Area.

== History ==
Neelyville was laid out in 1870. It was situated along the St. Louis, Iron Mountain and Southern Railway. The community was named after Obadiah Neely, an early citizen. A post office called Neelyville has been in operation since 1873.

== Geography ==
Neelyville lies along U.S. Route 67 along with the future I-57 corridor

According to the United States Census Bureau, the city has a total area of 1.15 square miles (2.98 km^{2}), all land.

== Demographics ==
Historical population
Census	Pop.	Note	%±
1900	114		—
1910	241		111.4%
1920	237		−1.7%
1930	199		−16.0%
1940	280		40.7%
1950	457		63.2%
1960	385		−15.8%
1970	381		−1.0%
1980	474		24.4%
1990	381		−19.6%
2000	487		27.8%
2010	483		−0.8%
2020	318		−34.2%
U.S. Decennial Census

=== 2020 census ===
As of the 2020 United States census, there were 318 people and 98 households within the city. There were 155 housing units within the city, with an employment rate of 26.1% and a median income of $18,750 and a median age of 50.

=== 2010 census ===
As of the census of 2010, there were 483 people, 181 households, and 120 families living in the city. The population density was 420.0 inhabitants per square mile (162.2/km^{2}). There were 213 housing units at an average density of 185.2 per square mile (71.5/km^{2}). The racial makeup of the city was 82.82% White, 12.42% Black or African American, 0.83% Native American, 0.41% Asian, and 3.52% from two or more races. Hispanic or Latino of any race were 0.41% of the population.

There were 181 households, of which 42.5% had children under the age of 18 living with them, 40.3% were married couples living together, 17.7% had a female householder with no husband present, 8.3% had a male householder with no wife present, and 33.7% were non-families. 28.2% of all households were made up of individuals, and 14.3% had someone living alone who was 65 years of age or older. The average household size was 2.67 and the average family size was 3.22.

The median age in the city was 33.9 years. 32.3% of residents were under the age of 18; 6.8% were between the ages of 18 and 24; 26.2% were from 25 to 44; 21.5% were from 45 to 64; and 13.3% were 65 years of age or older. The gender makeup of the city was 52.0% male and 48.0% female.

=== 2000 census ===
As of the census of 2000, there were 487 people, 194 households, and 127 families living in the city. The population density was 419.3 inhabitants per square mile (161.9/km^{2}). There were 215 housing units at an average density of 185.1 per square mile (71.5/km^{2}). The racial makeup of the city was 79.26% White, 16.22% African American, 1.44% Native American, 0.82% Asian, 0.41% from other races, and 1.85% from two or more races.

There were 194 households, out of which 34.5% had children under the age of 18 living with them, 42.3% were married couples living together, 17.0% had a female householder with no husband present, and 34.5% were non-families. 30.9% of all households were made up of individuals, and 12.9% had someone living alone who was 65 years of age or older. The average household size was 2.51 and the average family size was 3.12.

In the city the population was spread out, with 30.0% under the age of 18, 10.3% from 18 to 24, 30.4% from 25 to 44, 19.5% from 45 to 64, and 9.9% who were 65 years of age or older. The median age was 32 years. For every 100 females, there were 91.7 males. For every 100 females age 18 and over, there were 78.5 males.

The median income for a household in the city was $21,719, and the median income for a family was $25,000. Males had a median income of $22,250 versus $15,735 for females. The per capita income for the city was $10,598. About 19.9% of families and 25.7% of the population were below the poverty line, including 32.3% of those under age 18 and 31.3% of those age 65 or over.
