= Butler County, Missouri =

County in Missouri, United States

- County
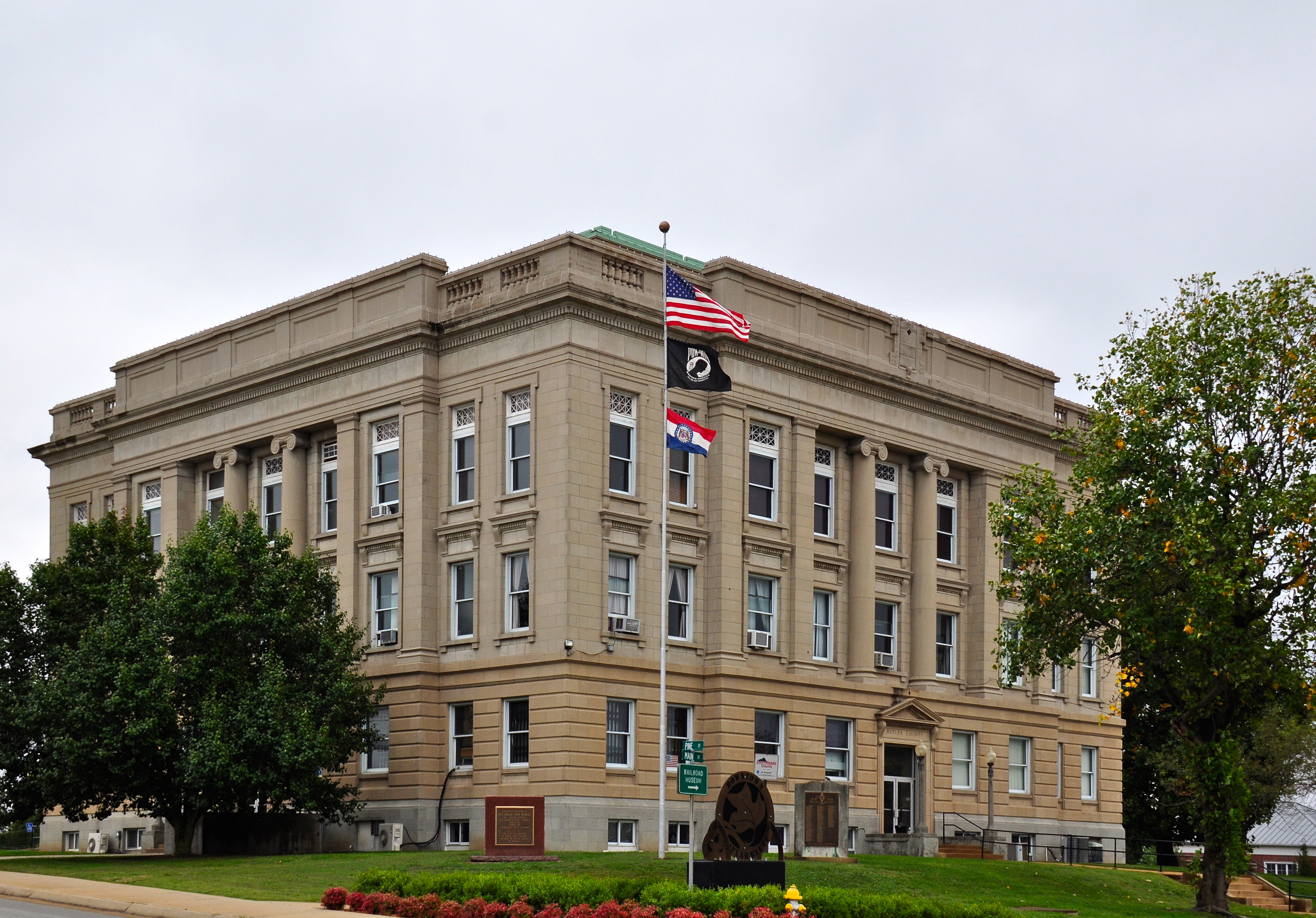
- Butler County Courthouse in Poplar Bluff

- Location within the U.S. state of Missouri
- Coordinates: 36°43′N 90°24′W
- Country: United States
- State: Missouri
- Founded: February 27, 1849
- Named for: William Orlando Butler
- Seat: Poplar Bluff
- Largest city: Poplar Bluff

Area
  - Total: 699 sq mi (1,810 km^{2})
  - Land: 695 sq mi (1,800 km^{2})
  - Water: 4.3 sq mi (11 km^{2}) 0.6%

Population (2020)
  - Total: 42,130
  - Estimate (2025): 41,904 ▼
  - Density: 60.6/sq mi (23.4/km^{2})
- Time zone: UTC−6 (Central)
  - Summer (DST): UTC−5 (CDT)
- Congressional district: 8th
- Website: butlercountymo.com

Butler County is a county located in the southeast Ozark Foothills Region in the U.S. state of Missouri. As of the 2020 Census, the county's population was 42,130. The largest city and county seat is Poplar Bluff. The county was officially organized from Wayne County on February 27, 1849, and is named after former U.S. Representative William O. Butler (D-Kentucky), who was also an unsuccessful candidate for Vice President of the United States. The first meeting in the Butler County Courthouse was held on June 18, 1849.

Butler County comprises the Poplar Bluff, MO Micropolitan Statistical Area.

== Geography ==
According to the U.S. Census Bureau, the county has a total area of 699 square miles (1,810 km^{2}), of which 695 square miles (1,800 km^{2}) is land and 4.3 square miles (11 km^{2}) (0.6%) is water.

=== Adjacent counties ===
- Wayne County (north)
- Stoddard County (northeast)
- Dunklin County (southeast)
- Clay County, Arkansas (south)
- Ripley County (west)
- Carter County (northwest)

=== Major highways ===
- Future I-57
- US 60
  - US 60 Bus. (Poplar Bluff)
- US 67
  - US 67 Bus. (Poplar Bluff)
- US 160
- Route 51
- Route 53
- Route 142
- Route 158

=== National protected area ===
- Mark Twain National Forest (part)

== Demographics ==
Historical population
Census	Pop.	Note	%±
1850	1,616		—
1860	2,891		78.9%
1870	4,298		48.7%
1880	6,011		39.9%
1890	10,164		69.1%
1900	16,769		65.0%
1910	20,624		23.0%
1920	24,106		16.9%
1930	23,697		−1.7%
1940	34,276		44.6%
1950	37,707		10.0%
1960	34,656		−8.1%
1970	33,529		−3.3%
1980	37,693		12.4%
1990	38,765		2.8%
2000	40,867		5.4%
2010	42,794		4.7%
2020	42,130		−1.6%
2025 (est.)	41,904	▼	−0.5%
U.S. Decennial Census; 1790-1960 1900-1990; 1990-2000 2010-2020

=== 2020 census ===
As of the 2020 census, the county had a population of 42,130 and a median age of 40.5 years. 23.3% of residents were under the age of 18 and 18.9% of residents were 65 years of age or older. For every 100 females there were 94.4 males, and for every 100 females age 18 and over there were 91.4 males age 18 and over. 48.5% of residents lived in urban areas, while 51.5% lived in rural areas.

The racial makeup of the county was 85.5% White, 5.9% Black or African American, 0.5% American Indian and Alaska Native, 0.7% Asian, 0.0% Native Hawaiian and Pacific Islander, 0.8% from some other race, and 6.5% from two or more races. Hispanic or Latino residents of any race comprised 2.1% of the population; the detailed racial breakdown appears in the table below.

There were 17,116 households in the county, of which 29.7% had children under the age of 18 living with them and 30.2% had a female householder with no spouse or partner present. About 30.6% of all households were made up of individuals and 13.9% had someone living alone who was 65 years of age or older.

There were 19,287 housing units, of which 11.3% were vacant. Among occupied housing units, 64.0% were owner-occupied and 36.0% were renter-occupied. The homeowner vacancy rate was 2.4% and the rental vacancy rate was 8.9%.

Butler County, Missouri – Racial and ethnic composition Note: the US Census treats Hispanic/Latino as an ethnic category. This table excludes Latinos from the racial categories and assigns them to a separate category. Hispanics/Latinos may be of any race.
Race / Ethnicity (NH = Non-Hispanic)	Pop 1980	Pop 1990	Pop 2000	Pop 2010	Pop 2020	% 1980	% 1990	% 2000	% 2010	% 2020
White alone (NH)	35,386	36,329	37,435	38,504	35,745	93.88%	93.72%	91.60%	89.98%	84.84%
Black or African American alone (NH)	1,875	1,971	2,105	2,235	2,463	4.97%	5.08%	5.15%	5.22%	5.85%
Native American or Alaska Native alone (NH)	82	130	215	215	198	0.22%	0.34%	0.53%	0.50%	0.47%
Asian alone (NH)	100	116	176	283	304	0.27%	0.30%	0.43%	0.66%	0.72%
Native Hawaiian or Pacific Islander alone (NH)	x	x	4	15	12	x	x	0.01%	0.04%	0.03%
Other race alone (NH)	35	2	25	35	100	0.09%	0.01%	0.06%	0.08%	0.24%
Mixed race or Multiracial (NH)	x	x	495	841	2,407	x	x	1.21%	1.97%	5.71%
Hispanic or Latino (any race)	215	217	412	666	901	0.57%	0.56%	1.01%	1.56%	2.14%
Total	37,693	38,765	40,867	42,794	42,130	100.00%	100.00%	100.00%	100.00%	100.00%

=== 2000 census ===
As of the 2000 census, there were 40,867 people, 16,718 households, and 11,318 families residing in the county. The population density was 59 people per square mile (23 people/km^{2}). There were 18,707 housing units at an average density of 27 units per square mile (10/km^{2}). The racial makeup of the county was 92.16% White, 5.22% Black or African American, 0.56% Native American, 0.44% Asian, 0.01% Pacific Islander, 0.26% from other races, and 1.36% from two or more races. Approximately 1.01% of the population were Hispanic or Latino of any race.

Among the major first ancestries reported in Butler County were 31.7% American, 13.8% German, 11.6% Irish and 10.5% English.

There were 16,718 households, out of which 29.70% had children under the age of 18 living with them, 52.50% were married couples living together, 11.60% had a female householder with no husband present, and 32.30% were non-families. 28.00% of all households were made up of individuals, and 12.70% had someone living alone who was 65 years of age or older. The average household size was 2.39 and the average family size was 2.91.

In the county, the population was spread out, with 24.20% under the age of 18, 8.40% from 18 to 24, 26.60% from 25 to 44, 24.10% from 45 to 64, and 16.70% who were 65 years of age or older. The median age was 39 years. For every 100 females there were 92.00 males. For every 100 females age 18 and over, there were 87.10 males.

The median income for a household in the county was $34,422, and the median income for a family was $42,713. Males had a median income of $27,449 versus $19,374 for females. The per capita income for the county was $20,282. About 14.00% of families and 18.60% of the population were below the poverty line, including 25.90% of those under age 18 and 16.90% of those age 65 or over.

=== Religion ===
According to the Association of Religion Data Archives County Membership Report (2010), Butler County is part of the Bible Belt, with evangelical Protestantism being the most predominant religion. The most predominant denominations among residents in Butler County who adhere to a religion are Southern Baptists (36.39%), nondenominational evangelical groups (14.64%), and Roman Catholics (11.92%).

== Education ==
Of adults 25 years of age and older in Butler County, 83.5% possesses a high school diploma or higher while 13.9% holds a bachelor's degree or higher as their highest educational attainment.

=== Public Schools ===
- Neelyville R-IV School District - Neelyville
  - Hillview Elementary School - Harviell - (PK-02)
  - Neelyville Elementary School - (03-06)
  - Neelyville High School - (07-12)
- Poplar Bluff R-I School District - Poplar Bluff
  - Eugene Field Elementary School - (01-03)
  - Mark Twain Early Childhood Center - (PK/Daycare)
  - Lake Road Elementary School - (01-04)
  - Poplar Bluff Kindergarten Center - (K)
  - O'Neal Elementary School - (01-03)
  - Oak Grove Elementary School - (01-03)
  - Poplar Bluff Middle School - (04-06)
  - Poplar Bluff Jr. High School (07-08)
  - Poplar Bluff High School (09-12)
- Twin Rivers R-X School District - Broseley
  - Fisk Elementary School - Fisk - (K-08)
  - Qulin Elementary School - Qulin - (K-08)
  - Twin Rivers High School - Broseley - (09-12)

=== Private schools ===
- Sacred Heart Elementary School - Poplar Bluff - (PK-08) - Roman Catholic
- Westwood Baptist Academy - Poplar Bluff - (PK-12) - Baptist
- Zion Lutheran School - Poplar Bluff - Lutheran Church–Missouri Synod

=== Special education/other schools ===
- Hentz Alternative Learning Center - Poplar Bluff
- Shady Grove State School - Poplar Bluff
- Sierra-Osage Treatment Center - Poplar Bluff
- W.E. Sears Youth Center - Poplar Bluff

=== Post-secondary ===
- Three Rivers College - Poplar Bluff - A public, two-year community college.

=== Public libraries ===
- Fisk Community Library
- Poplar Bluff Public Library

== Politics ==
=== Local ===
Butler County, Missouri

Elected countywide officials
Assessor	Chris Rickman	Republican
Circuit Clerk	Cindi Bowman	Republican
County Clerk	Donna Hillis	Republican
Collector	Emily Parks	Republican
Commissioner (presiding)	Vince Lampe	Republican
Commissioner (district 1)	Don Anderson	Republican
Commissioner (district 2)	Dennis LeGrand	Republican
Coroner	Jim Akers	Republican
Prosecuting Attorney	Kacey Proctor	Republican
Public Administrator	Jeff Darnell	Republican
Recorder	Debby Lundstrom	Republican
Sheriff	Mark Dobbs	Republican
Treasurer	Tammy Marler	Republican

The Republican Party completely controls all politics at the local level in Butler County.

=== State ===
Past gubernatorial election results
Year	Republican	Democratic	Third parties
2024	82.17% 14,510	16.23% 2,866	1.60% 282
2020	79.63% 14,337	18.60% 3,349	1.77% 318
2016	73.78% 12,598	23.65% 4,039	2.57% 438
2012	55.46% 9,251	42.18% 7,036	2.36% 393
2008	54.12% 9,205	43.86% 7,459	2.02% 343
2004	66.12% 10,796	32.85% 5,364	1.03% 168
2000	58.40% 8,301	39.80% 5,657	1.80% 257
1996	47.71% 6,793	50.63% 7,208	1.66% 237
1992	49.18% 7,335	50.82% 7,581	0.00% 0
1988	66.86% 9,060	33.12% 4,488	0.02% 3
1984	59.67% 7,875	40.33% 5,323	0.00% 0
1980	53.17% 7,471	46.75% 6,569	0.07% 10
1976	52.91% 6,489	46.82% 5,742	0.27% 33
1972	54.67% 6,972	45.23% 5,768	0.09% 12
1968	41.44% 5,393	58.56% 7,621	0.00% 0
1964	38.67% 5,021	61.33% 7,964	0.00% 0
1960	49.56% 6,772	50.44% 6,891	0.00% 0

Butler County is split between two legislative districts in the Missouri House of Representatives, both of which are represented by Republicans.

- District 152 is currently represented by Hardy Billington (R-Poplar Bluff). It consists of all of the cities of Neelyville, Qulin, and Poplar Bluff; all of the census-designated place of Harviell; and the unincorporated communities of Angus, Batesville, Belcher, Booser, Broseley, Fagus, Hubbel, Kremlin, Loma Linda, Nyssa, Oglesville, Platanus, Resnik, Roxie, Taft, and Vastus.

Missouri House of Representatives — District 152 — Butler County (2020)
Party	Candidate	Votes	%	±%
Republican	Hardy Billington	9,595	100.00%	+30.81

Missouri House of Representatives — District 152 — Butler County (2018)
Party	Candidate	Votes	%	±%
Republican	Hardy Billington	5,890	69.19%	−30.81
Democratic	Robert L. Smith	2,623	30.81%	+30.81

- District 153 is currently represented by Darrell Atchison (R-Williamsville). It consists of all of the city of Fisk and the unincorporated communities of Ash Hill, Barron, Empire, Halloran, Hamtown, Hendrickson, Hilliard, Keener, Kinzer, Morocco, Rombauer, and Wilby.

Missouri House of Representatives — District 153 — Butler County (2020)
Party	Candidate	Votes	%	±%
Republican	Darrell Atchison	6,147	100.00%	+18.87

Missouri House of Representatives — District 153 — Butler County (2018)
Party	Candidate	Votes	%	±%
Republican	Jeff Shawan	4,249	81.13%	+0.04
Democratic	Matt Michel	988	18.87%	−0.05

All of Butler County is included in Missouri's 25th Senatorial District and is represented by Republican Jason Bean (R-Holcomb) in the Missouri Senate.

Missouri Senate — District 25 — Butler County (2020)
Party	Candidate	Votes	%	±%
Republican	Jason Bean	16,168	100.00%	+23.84

Missouri Senate — District 25 — Butler County (2016)
Party	Candidate	Votes	%	±%
Republican	Doug Libla	12,741	76.16%	+6.54
Democratic	Bill Burlison	3,989	23.84%	−6.54

=== Federal ===
All of Butler County is included in Missouri's 8th Congressional District and is currently represented by Jason Smith (R-Salem) in the U.S. House of Representatives. Smith was elected to a fifth term in 2020 over Democratic challenger Kathy Ellis.

U.S. House of Representatives – Missouri’s 8th Congressional District – Butler County (2020)
Party	Candidate	Votes	%	±%
Republican	Jason Smith	14,372	80.67%	+1.02
Democratic	Kathy Ellis	3,154	17.70%	−1.14
Libertarian	Tom Schmitz	289	1.62%	+0.11

U.S. House of Representatives – Missouri's 8th Congressional District – Butler County (2018)
Party	Candidate	Votes	%	±%
Republican	Jason Smith	11,060	79.65%	+0.24
Democratic	Kathy Ellis	2,616	18.84%	+0.79
Libertarian	Jonathan L. Shell	210	1.51%	−1.04

Butler County, along with the rest of the state of Missouri, is represented in the U.S. Senate by Josh Hawley (R-Columbia) and Roy Blunt (R-Strafford).

U.S. Senate – Class I – Butler County (2018)
Party	Candidate	Votes	%	±%
Republican	Josh Hawley	10,727	76.47%	+22.14
Democratic	Claire McCaskill	2,961	21.11%	−19.48
Independent	Craig O'Dear	147	1.05%	
Libertarian	Japheth Campbell	115	0.82%	−4.26
Green	Jo Crain	77	0.55%	+0.55
	Write-Ins	1	0.01%	

Blunt was elected to a second term in 2016 over then-Missouri Secretary of State Jason Kander.

U.S. Senate - Class III - Butler County (2016)
Party	Candidate	Votes	%	±%
Republican	Roy Blunt	11,764	69.22%	
Democratic	Jason Kander	4,543	26.73%	
Libertarian	Jonathan Dine	371	2.18%	
Green	Johnathan McFarland	185	1.09%	
Constitution	Fred Ryman	132	0.78%	

==== Political culture ====
United States presidential election results for Butler County, Missouri
Year	Republican		Democratic		Third party(ies)	
Year	No.	%	No.	%	No.	%
1888	857	41.02%	1,189	56.92%	43	2.06%
1892	1,052	42.30%	1,233	49.58%	202	8.12%
1896	1,635	48.19%	1,743	51.37%	15	0.44%
1900	1,888	51.77%	1,670	45.79%	89	2.44%
1904	1,960	54.93%	1,369	38.37%	239	6.70%
1908	2,186	51.22%	1,893	44.35%	189	4.43%
1912	1,851	39.68%	1,946	41.71%	868	18.61%
1916	2,717	53.76%	2,135	42.24%	202	4.00%
1920	4,601	61.82%	2,662	35.77%	179	2.41%
1924	4,489	55.98%	2,953	36.83%	577	7.20%
1928	5,591	62.48%	3,320	37.10%	38	0.42%
1932	4,155	40.33%	6,058	58.80%	90	0.87%
1936	6,355	50.31%	6,234	49.35%	42	0.33%
1940	8,024	56.21%	6,213	43.52%	38	0.27%
1944	6,375	59.99%	4,219	39.70%	32	0.30%
1948	4,276	44.40%	5,319	55.23%	35	0.36%
1952	7,843	54.90%	6,426	44.98%	16	0.11%
1956	7,216	55.15%	5,869	44.85%	0	0.00%
1960	8,751	61.81%	5,406	38.19%	0	0.00%
1964	5,616	42.14%	7,710	57.86%	0	0.00%
1968	6,326	46.98%	4,379	32.52%	2,759	20.49%
1972	9,198	72.63%	3,466	27.37%	0	0.00%
1976	5,669	45.41%	6,759	54.14%	57	0.46%
1980	8,342	58.83%	5,605	39.52%	234	1.65%
1984	8,712	64.96%	4,699	35.04%	0	0.00%
1988	7,968	58.00%	5,751	41.86%	19	0.14%
1992	6,450	42.23%	6,602	43.23%	2,220	14.54%
1996	6,996	48.78%	5,780	40.30%	1,567	10.93%
2000	9,111	63.28%	4,996	34.70%	290	2.01%
2004	11,696	71.14%	4,666	28.38%	79	0.48%
2008	11,805	68.09%	5,316	30.66%	217	1.25%
2012	12,248	72.52%	4,363	25.83%	278	1.65%
2016	13,650	79.09%	3,036	17.59%	573	3.32%
2020	14,602	80.49%	3,301	18.20%	238	1.31%
2024	14,549	81.46%	3,160	17.69%	151	0.85%

At the presidential level, Butler County is solidly Republican. Butler County strongly favored Donald Trump in both 2016 and 2020. Bill Clinton was the last Democratic presidential nominee to carry Butler County in 1992 with a plurality of the vote, and a Democrat hasn't won majority support from the county's voters in a presidential election since Jimmy Carter in 1976.

Like most rural areas throughout Missouri, voters in Butler County generally adhere to socially and culturally conservative principles which tend to influence their Republican leanings. Despite Butler County's longstanding tradition of supporting socially conservative platforms, voters in the county have a penchant for advancing populist causes. In 2018, Missourians voted on a proposition (Proposition A) concerning right to work, the outcome of which ultimately reversed the right to work legislation passed in the state the previous year. 54.47% of Butler County voters cast their ballots to overturn the law.

=== Missouri presidential preference primaries ===
==== 2020 ====
The 2020 presidential primaries for both the Democratic and Republican parties were held in Missouri on March 10. On the Democratic side, former Vice President Joe Biden (D-Delaware) both won statewide and carried Butler County by a wide margin. Biden went on to defeat President Donald Trump in the general election.

Missouri Democratic Presidential Primary – Butler County (2020)
Party	Candidate	Votes	%	±%
Democratic	Joe Biden	997	60.72	
Democratic	Bernie Sanders	564	34.35	
Democratic	Tulsi Gabbard	10	0.61	
Democratic	Others/Uncommitted	71	4.32	

Incumbent President Donald Trump (R-Florida) faced a primary challenge from former Massachusetts Governor Bill Weld, but won both Butler County and statewide by overwhelming margins.

Missouri Republican Presidential Primary – Butler County (2020)
Party	Candidate	Votes	%	±%
Republican	Donald Trump	2,999	98.65	
Republican	Bill Weld	7	0.23	
Republican	Others/Uncommitted	34	1.12	

==== 2016 ====
The 2016 presidential primaries for both the Republican and Democratic parties were held in Missouri on March 15. Businessman Donald Trump (R-New York) narrowly won the state overall, but carried a majority of the vote in Butler County. He went on to win the presidency.

Missouri Republican Presidential Primary – Butler County (2016)
Party	Candidate	Votes	%	±%
Republican	Donald Trump	3,652	50.47	
Republican	Ted Cruz	2,676	36.98	
Republican	John Kasich	427	5.90	
Republican	Marco Rubio	324	4.48	
Republican	Others/Uncommitted	157	2.17	

On the Democratic side, former Secretary of State Hillary Clinton (D-New York) narrowly won statewide and carried a majority in Butler County.

Missouri Democratic Presidential Primary – Butler County (2016)
Party	Candidate	Votes	%	±%
Democratic	Hillary Clinton	889	52.76	
Democratic	Bernie Sanders	766	45.46	
Democratic	Others/Uncommitted	30	1.78	

==== 2012 ====
The 2012 Missouri Republican Presidential Primary's results were nonbinding on the state's national convention delegates. Voters in Butler County supported former U.S. Senator Rick Santorum (R-Pennsylvania), who finished first in the state at large, but eventually lost the nomination to former Governor Mitt Romney (R-Massachusetts). Delegates to the congressional district and state conventions were chosen at a county caucus, which selected a delegation favoring Santorum. Incumbent President Barack Obama easily won the Missouri Democratic Primary and renomination. He defeated Romney in the general election.

==== 2008 ====
In 2008, the Missouri Republican Presidential Primary was closely contested, with Senator John McCain (R-Arizona) prevailing and eventually winning the nomination. However, former Governor Mike Huckabee (R-Arkansas) won a plurality in Butler County.

Missouri Republican Presidential Primary – Butler County (2008)
Party	Candidate	Votes	%	±%
Republican	Mike Huckabee	2,215	48.85	
Republican	John McCain	1,117	24.64	
Republican	Mitt Romney	1,007	22.21	
Republican	Ron Paul	134	2.96	
Republican	Others/Uncommitted	61	1.35	

Then-Senator Hillary Clinton (D-New York) received more votes than any candidate from either party in Butler County during the 2008 presidential primary. Despite initial reports that Clinton had won Missouri, Barack Obama (D-Illinois), also a Senator at the time, narrowly defeated her statewide and later became that year's Democratic nominee, going on to win the presidency.

Missouri Democratic Presidential Primary – Butler County (2008)
Party	Candidate	Votes	%	±%
Democratic	Hillary Clinton	2,490	69.87	
Democratic	Barack Obama	960	26.94	
Democratic	Others/Uncommitted	114	3.20	

== Communities ==
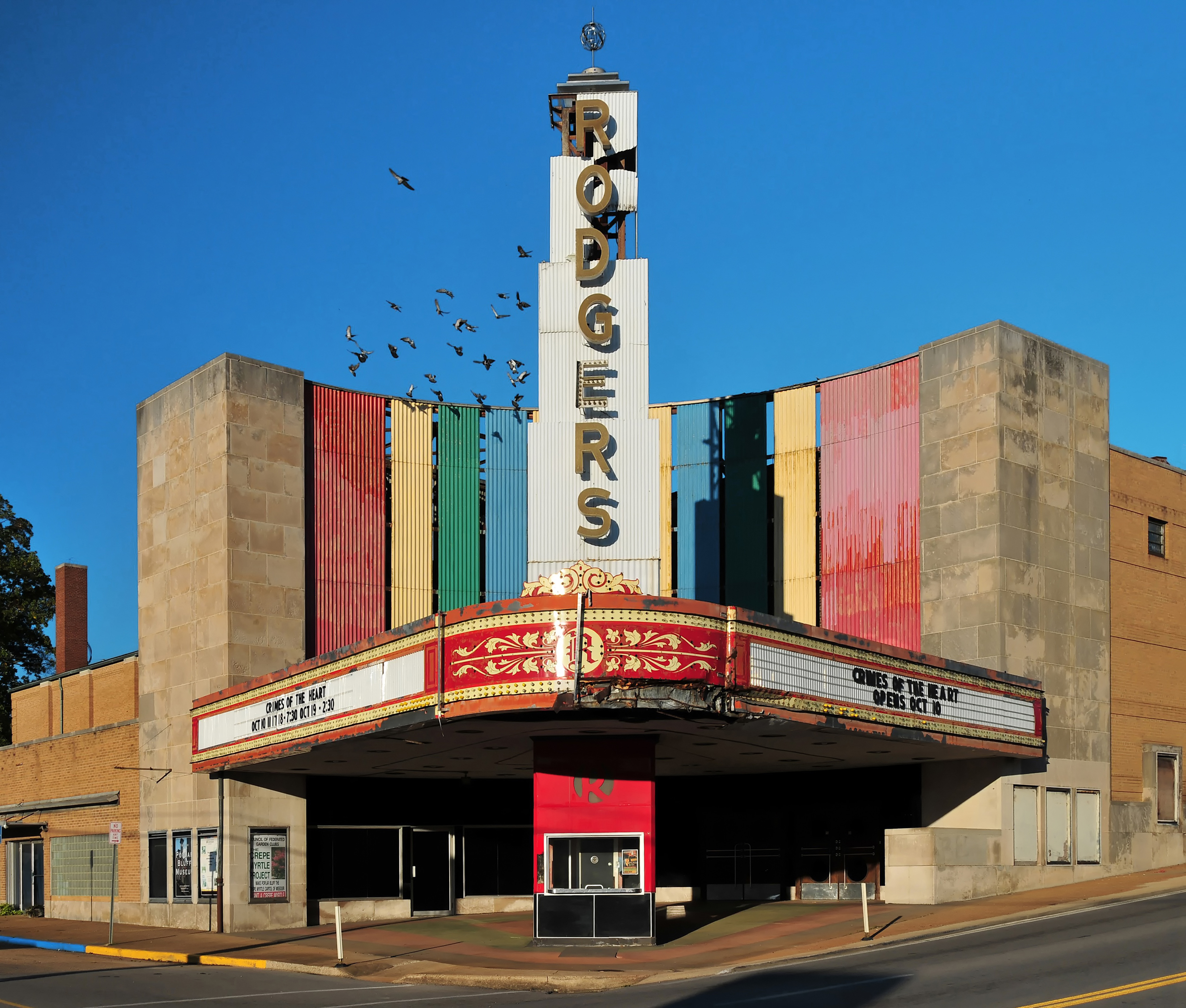
The Art Deco-style Rodgers Theatre opened in Poplar Bluff on June 1, 1949.

=== Cities ===
- Fisk
- Neelyville
- Poplar Bluff (county seat and largest municipality)
- Qulin

=== Census-designated places ===
- Broseley
- Fairdealing (part)
- Harviell

=== Other unincorporated communities ===
- Ash Hill
- Batesville
- Carola
- Empire
- Fagus
- Halloran
- Hendrickson
- Hilliard
- Hubbells
- Junland
- Keeners
- Kinzer
- Kremlin Mill
- Milltown
- Nyssa
- Oglesville
- Parks
- Rombauer
- Rossville
- Stringtown
- Taft
- Vastus
- Wilby

=== Townships ===
Butler County is divided into ten townships:

- Ash Hill
- Beaver Dam
- Black River
- Cane Creek
- Coon Island
- Epps
- Gillis Bluff
- Neely
- Poplar Bluff
- St. Francois

== Notable people ==
- Linda Bloodworth-Thomason, television producer (Designing Women)
- Christian Boeving, fitness model, bodybuilder and actor
- Sean Fister, 1995, 2001 and 2005 World Long Drive Champion, inducted to 3 Hall of Fames
- Leroy Griffith, burlesque theater owner and film producer
- Tyler Hansbrough, NBA basketball player for the Toronto Raptors, Indiana Pacers and the Charlotte Hornets
- Scott Innes, radio broadcaster and voice actor for Scooby-Doo
- Charles Jaco, CNN reporter
- Billie G. Kanell, Medal of Honor recipient, United States Army
- Tim Lollar, professional baseball pitcher
- Matt Lucas, singer, drummer and songwriter
- Julie McCullough, actress-model (Growing Pains and Playboy Playmate)
- Derland Moore, professional football player
- Mikel Rouse, composer

== See also ==
- National Register of Historic Places listings in Butler County, Missouri
- List of counties in Missouri
