= National Register of Historic Places listings in Butler County, Missouri =

Location of Butler County in Missouri

This is a list of the National Register of Historic Places listings in Butler County, Missouri.

This is intended to be a complete list of the properties and districts on the National Register of Historic Places in Butler County, Missouri, United States. Latitude and longitude coordinates are provided for many National Register properties and districts; these locations may be seen together in a map.

There are 25 properties and districts listed on the National Register in the county.

This National Park Service list is complete through NPS recent listings posted March 14, 2025.

== Current listings ==
	Name on the Register	Image	Date listed	Location	City or town	Description
1	Butler County Courthouse	Butler County Courthouse	December 1, 1994 (#94001400)	Public Sq. 36°45′23″N 90°23′32″W	Poplar Bluff	
2	Cynthia-Kinzer Historic District		July 21, 2015 (#15000441)	900-1000 blocks of Cynthia & Kinzer, 918-924 Maud & 838-842 Kinzer Sts. 36°45′40″N 90°24′16″W	Poplar Bluff	
3	Garfield Historic District	Garfield Historic District	October 2, 2017 (#100001686)	914-916, 915, 921 Garfield St. 36°45′53″N 90°23′50″W	Poplar Bluff	Includes historic Negro school, a church, and a grocery store/house
4	Alfred W. Greer House	Alfred W. Greer House	February 12, 1998 (#98000029)	955 Kinzer St. 36°45′39″N 90°24′10″W	Poplar Bluff	
5	Hargrove Pivot Bridge	Hargrove Pivot Bridge	October 15, 1985 (#85003234)	Carries CR 159 over the Black River; 36°38′50″N 90°18′00″W	Poplar Bluff	
6	Koehler Fortified Archeological Site		December 18, 1970 (#70000323)	Southeastern quarter of Section 36, Township 23 North, Range 4 East; 36°35′39″N 90°34′48″W	Naylor	Also known as Powers Fort; a cultural center during Mississippian times
7	Little Black River Archeological District		April 21, 1975 (#75001064)	Sharecropper, Harris, and Mackintosh Ridges; 36°33′20″N 90°32′40″W	Naylor	Hundreds of Mississippian archaeological sites, many of them small
8	Mark Twain School	Mark Twain School	February 5, 1998 (#98000031)	1012 N. Main St. 36°45′58″N 90°24′04″W	Poplar Bluff	
9	J. Herbert Moore House	J. Herbert Moore House	February 12, 1998 (#98000032)	445 N. Eleventh St. 36°45′40″N 90°22′20″W	Poplar Bluff	
10	Thomas Moore House	Thomas Moore House	February 12, 1998 (#98000033)	435 Lester St. 36°45′35″N 90°23′39″W	Poplar Bluff	
11	Moore-Dalton House	Moore-Dalton House	December 1, 1994 (#94001398)	421 N. Main St. 36°45′35″N 90°23′38″W	Poplar Bluff	
12	North Main Street Historic District	North Main Street Historic District	July 14, 2011 (#11000440)	400 block of N. Main St. 36°45′38″N 90°23′40″W	Poplar Bluff	
13	John Archibald Phillips House	John Archibald Phillips House	February 12, 1998 (#98000034)	522 Cherry St. 36°45′14″N 90°23′50″W	Poplar Bluff	
14	Poplar Bluff Commercial Historic District		December 1, 1994 (#94001401)	Roughly, S. Broadway from Cedar St. to Vine St. and Vine from Fifth St. to S. Broadway; 36°45′21″N 90°23′40″W	Poplar Bluff	
15	Poplar Bluff Public Library	Poplar Bluff Public Library	December 1, 1994 (#94001399)	318 N. Main St. 36°45′29″N 90°23′32″W	Poplar Bluff	
16	Rodgers Theatre Building	Rodgers Theatre Building	July 19, 2001 (#01000750)	204, 214, 216, 218, 220, 222 and 224 N. Broadway; 36°45′26″N 90°23′36″W	Poplar Bluff	
17	South Sixth Street Historic District		February 12, 1998 (#98000035)	205-225-303 S. Sixth St. 36°45′21″N 90°23′50″W	Poplar Bluff	
18	St. Louis, Iron Mountain and Southern Railroad Depot	St. Louis, Iron Mountain and Southern Railroad Depot	December 1, 1994 (#94001397)	400 S. Main St. 36°45′13″N 90°23′36″W	Poplar Bluff	
19	St. Louis-San Francisco Railroad Depot	St. Louis-San Francisco Railroad Depot	December 1, 1994 (#94001396)	303 Moran St. 36°45′15″N 90°23′43″W	Poplar Bluff	
20	Wheatley Public School	Wheatley Public School	February 13, 1998 (#98000037)	921 Garfield St. 36°45′53″N 90°23′49″W	Poplar Bluff	Historic school for Negro children during Jim Crow era
21	Wilborn-Steinberg Site		November 9, 1972 (#72000706)	Northwestern quarter of the southeastern quarter of Section 9, Township 22 North, Range 5 East; 36°34′03″N 90°31′42″W	Neelyville	
22	Williams-Gierth House	Williams-Gierth House	November 6, 2012 (#12000909)	848 Vine St. 36°45′27″N 90°24′04″W	Poplar Bluff	
23	Williamson-Kennedy School	Williamson-Kennedy School	February 12, 1998 (#98000036)	614 Lindsay St. 36°45′38″N 90°23′30″W	Poplar Bluff	
24	Wright-Dalton-Bell-Anchor Department Store Building	Wright-Dalton-Bell-Anchor Department Store Building	April 12, 2006 (#06000247)	201-205 S. Main; 36°45′19″N 90°23′36″W	Poplar Bluff	
25	Zehe Building	Zehe Building	December 1, 1994 (#94001402)	203 Poplar St. 36°45′20″N 90°23′32″W	Poplar Bluff	

== See also ==
- List of National Historic Landmarks in Missouri
- National Register of Historic Places listings in Missouri
