= Garfield Historic District (Poplar Bluff, Missouri) =

Historic district in Missouri, United States

- U.S. National Register of Historic Places
- U.S. Historic district
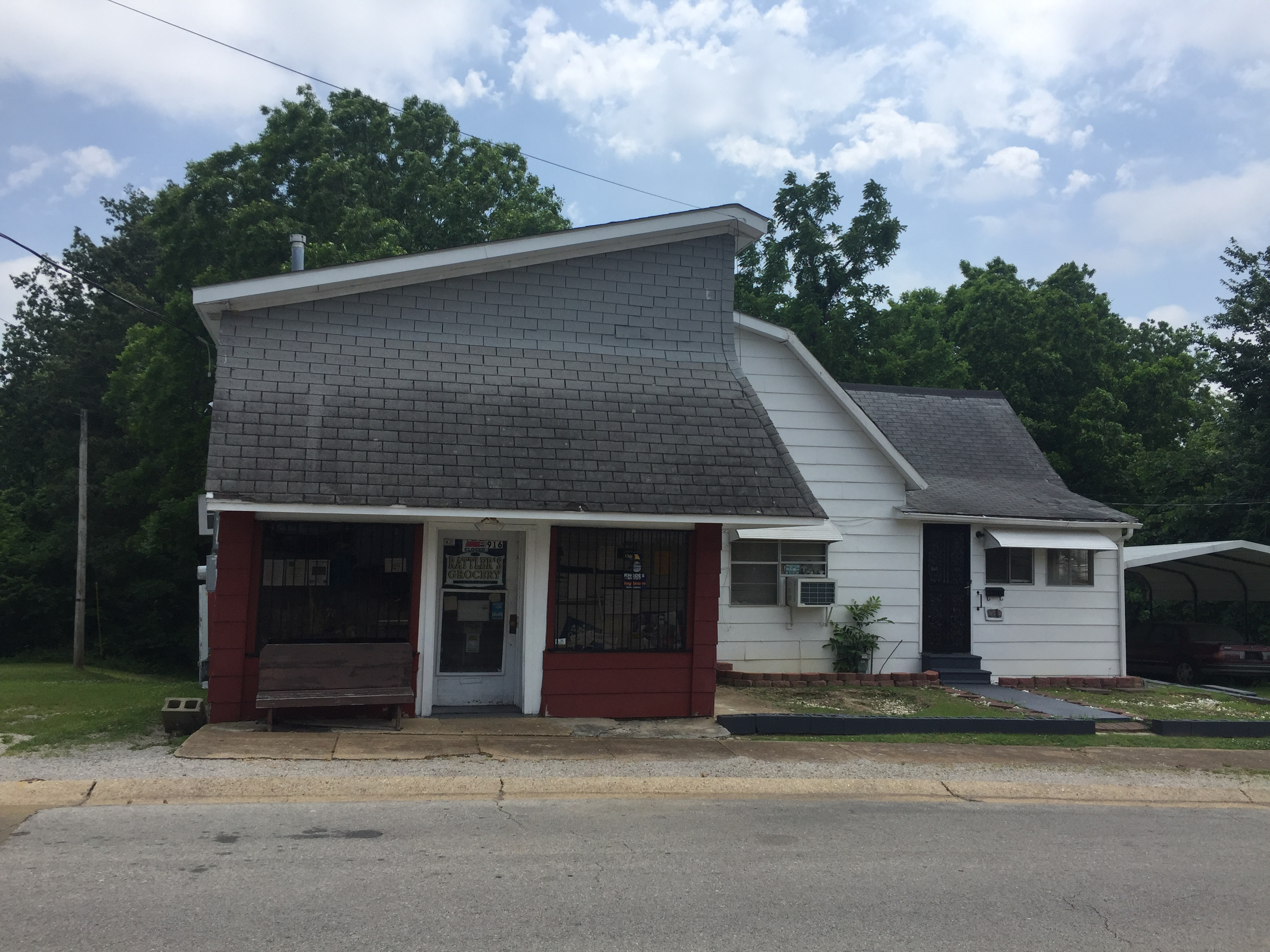
- Gatlin Grocery Store - Frank and Lutie Jordan House, in 2022

- Location within Missouri Location within the United States
- Location: 914-916, 915, 921 Garfield St., Poplar Bluff, Missouri
- Coordinates: 36.76486°N 90.39718°W
- Area: 1.3 acres (0.53 ha)
- Built by: J. J. Miller; A. W. Greer
- Architect: Bonsack and Pearce, Inc
- Architectural style: Colonial Revival (school)
- NRHP reference No.: 100001686
- Added to NRHP: October 2, 2017

The Garfield Historic District in Poplar Bluff, Missouri is a historic district which was listed on the National Register of Historic Places in 2017. It encompasses three contributing buildings (a school, a church, and a grocery store/house) and one contributing object (a sign) in a predominantly residential section of Poplar Bluff.

Wheatley Public School was a segregated school for Negro children during the Jim Crow era, which was built in 1928 in Colonial Revival style. It was previously separately listed on the National Register, in 1998. The school building is now a museum, the Wheatley School Museum. As of 2017 the museum could be visited upon appointment made at the Rattler's Grocery, operated by Rex Rattler Sr.

The District also includes the Gatlin Grocery Store - Frank and Lutie Jordan House, built in 1908, and Pleasant Hill Baptist Church at 915 Garfield St. The church was completed in 1919. The church's sign, from 1963, is a contributing object.

The district "is in a section of Poplar Bluff that represents the area where African Americans settled and formed a community within Poplar Bluff." It was deemed significant as an "intact cohesive collection" of early twentieth-century commercial, educational and religious buildings "that interrelate to express a history of development, commerce, education, and social history spanning the district’s period of significance 1908 - 1968."

The district was added to the National Register of Historic Places in 2017.

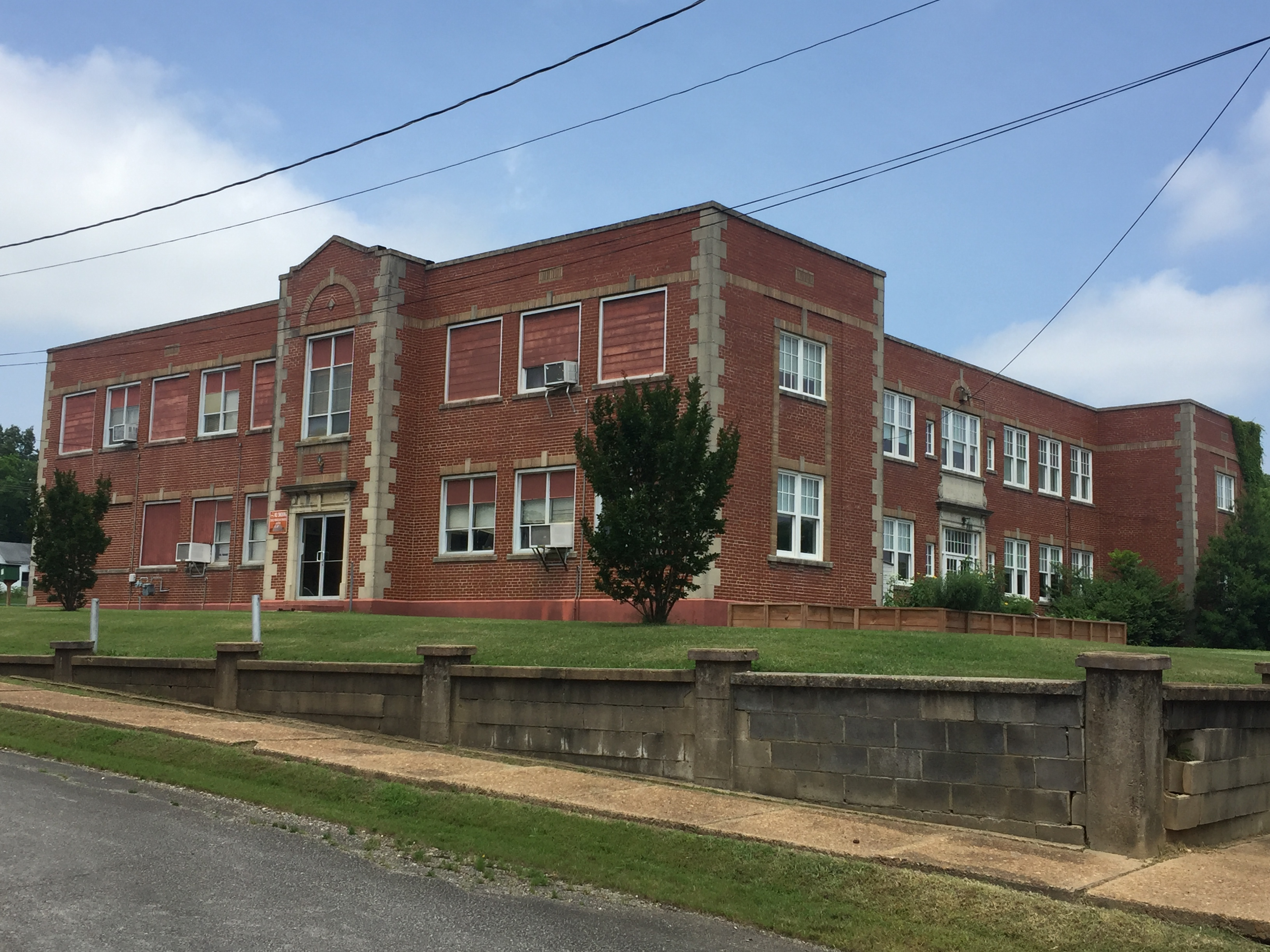
Wheatley Public School, in 2022

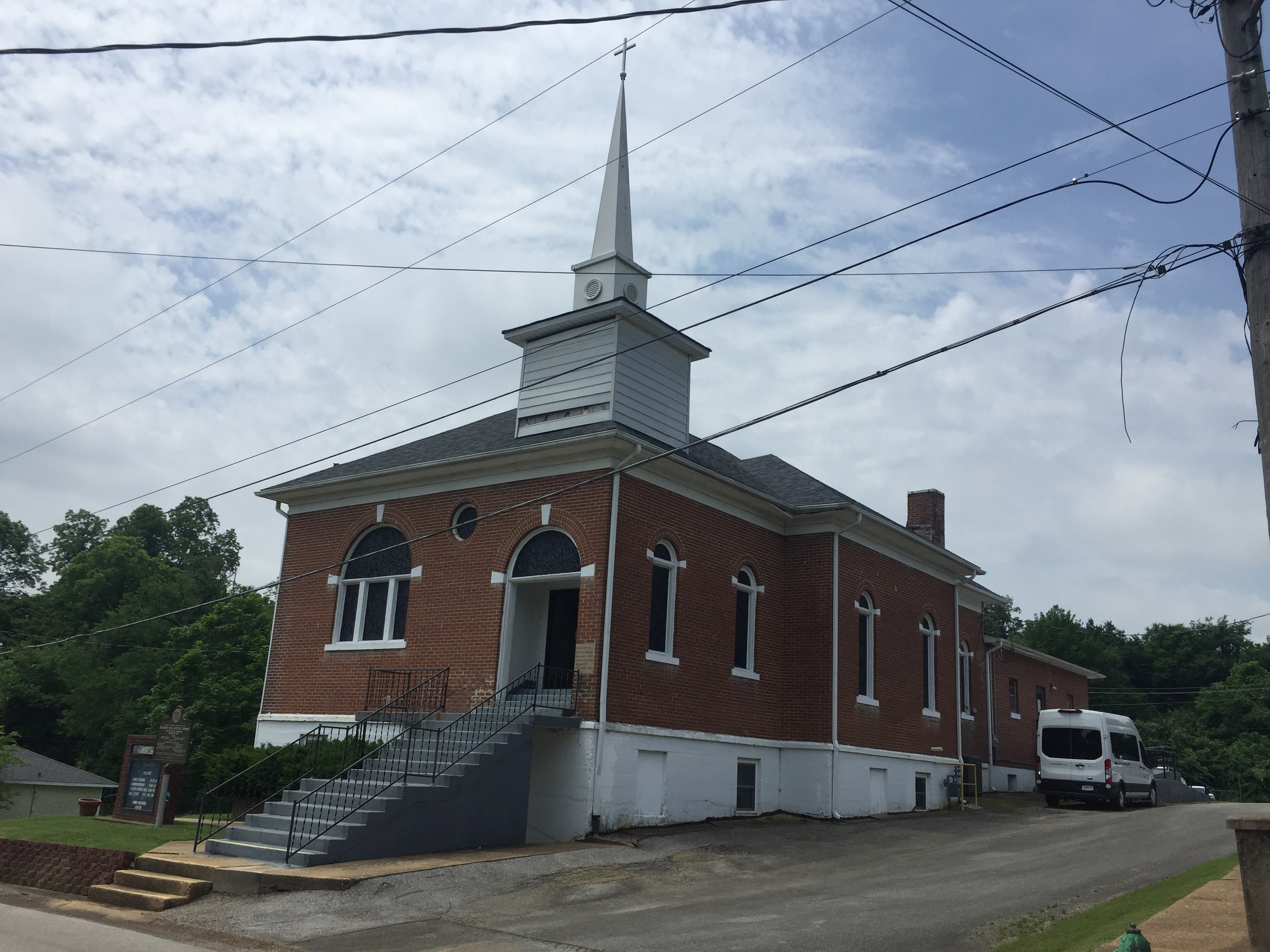
Pleasant Hill Baptist Church, in 2022
