= Hargrove Pivot Bridge =

- U.S. National Register of Historic Places
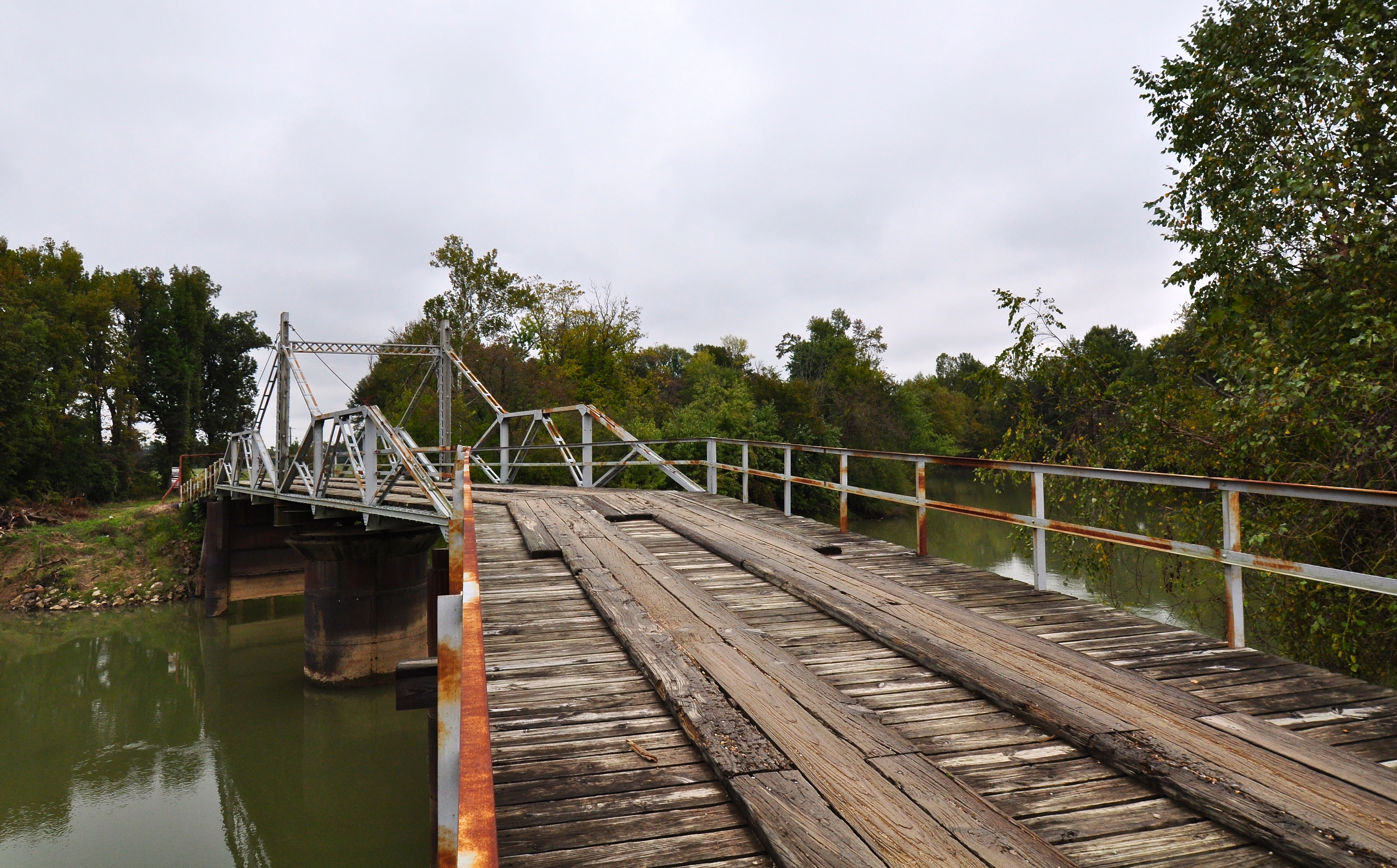
- Hargrove Pivot Bridge, October 2014

- Location within Missouri Location within the United States
- Location: Carries CR 159 over the Black River, Poplar Bluff, Missouri
- Coordinates: 36°38′50″N 90°18′0″W
- Area: less than one acre
- Built: 1917
- Built by: Miller and Bocherding
- Architectural style: Wichert and Warren Truss
- NRHP reference No.: 85003234
- Added to NRHP: October 15, 1985

Hargrove Pivot Bridge, also known as Old Hargrove Bridge , is a historic swing bridge located at Poplar Bluff, Butler County, Missouri in the United States. It crosses the Black River. It was built in 1917, and is 220 feet (67 m) long with a turning span of 100 feet (30 m). This bridge has a modified Wichert truss as its center span and a modified Warren pony truss extending on each side of the center truss. The bridge has not been turned since 1942 due to the lack of river traffic in the area.

It was added to the National Register of Historic Places in 1985.

== See also ==
- National Register of Historic Places listings in Butler County, Missouri
