= Wheatley Public School =

- U.S. National Register of Historic Places
- U.S. Historic district – Contributing property
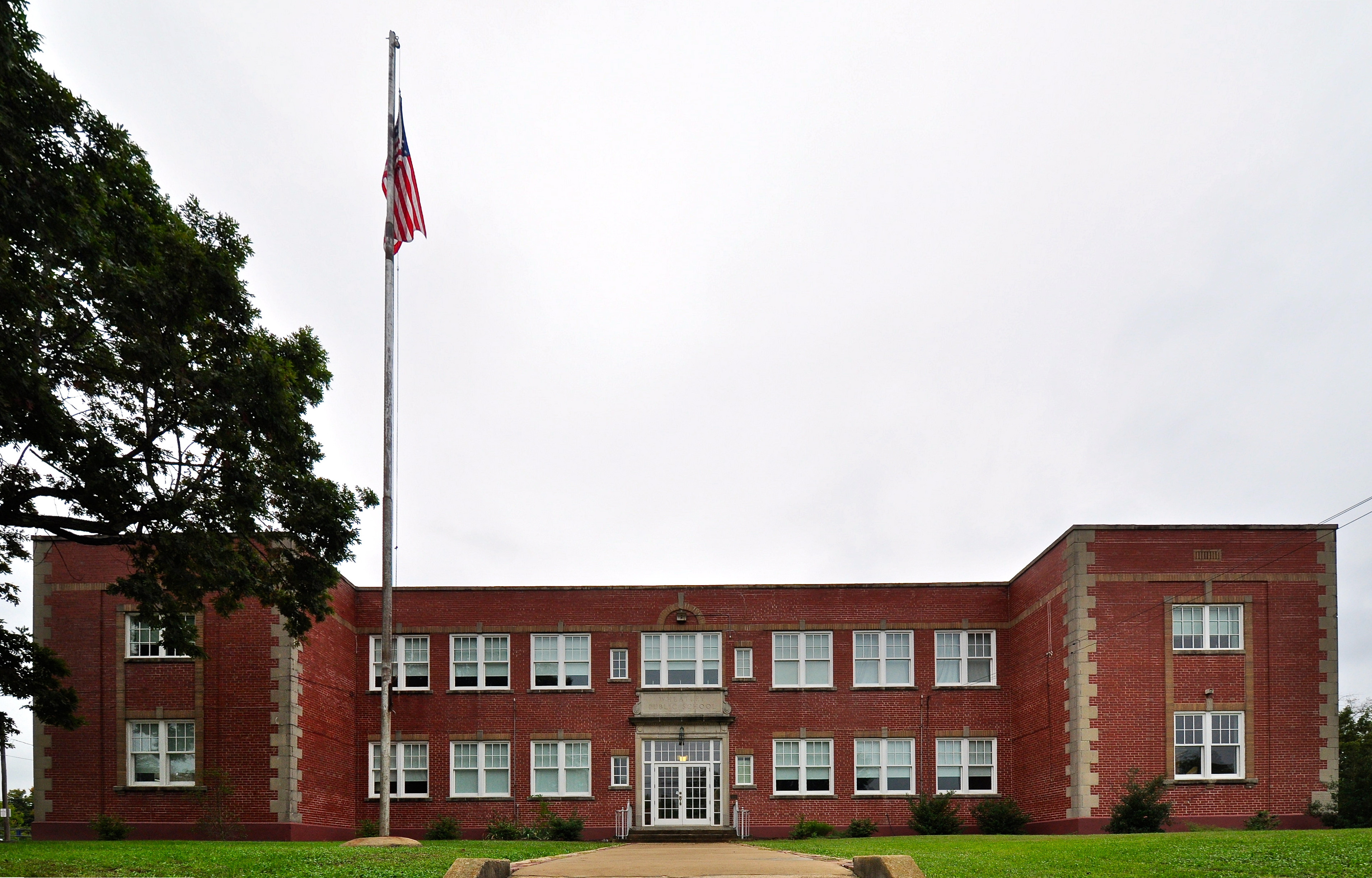
- Wheatley Public School, October 2014

- Location within Missouri Location within the United States
- Location: 921 Garfield St., Poplar Bluff, Missouri
- Coordinates: 36°45′53″N 90°23′49″W
- Area: less than one acre
- Built: 1928
- Architect: Bonsack and Pearce Inc.; Miller, J.J.
- Architectural style: Colonial Revival
- Part of: Garfield Historic District (ID100001686)
- MPS: Poplar Bluff MPS
- NRHP reference No.: 98000037

Significant dates
- Added to NRHP: February 13, 1998
- Designated CP: October 2, 2017

Wheatley Public School is a historic school building located at Poplar Bluff, Butler County, Missouri. It was built in 1928 population and remained so until the end of segregation in 1958. It is a two-story, "U"-plan, Colonial Revival style brick building with a central gymnasium. The building sits on a cast concrete foundation and has a flat roof. It was constructed to serve the African-American student It was listed on the National Register of Historic Places in 1998.

Along with two other contributing buildings, it is part of the Garfield Historic District, listed on the National Register in 2017.
