= Little Black River Archeological District =

Historic district in Missouri, United States

- U.S. National Register of Historic Places
- Nearest city: Naylor, Missouri
- Area: 362 acres (1.46 km^{2})
- NRHP reference No.: 75001064
- Added to NRHP: April 21, 1975

The Little Black River Archeological District, in Butler County, Missouri near Naylor, Missouri, is a 362-acre (1.46 km^{2}) historic district that was listed on the National Register of Historic Places in 1975. The listing included three contributing buildings, five contributing structures, and 260 contributing sites.

It includes the McCarty-Moore Site and is listed for its potential to yield information in the future.

It is located on Sharecropper, Harris, and Mackintosh Ridges. It includes hundreds of Mississippian archaeological sites, many of them small.
