= Poplar Bluff station (St. Louis and San Francisco Railroad) =

- St. Louis-San Francisco Railroad Depot
- U.S. National Register of Historic Places
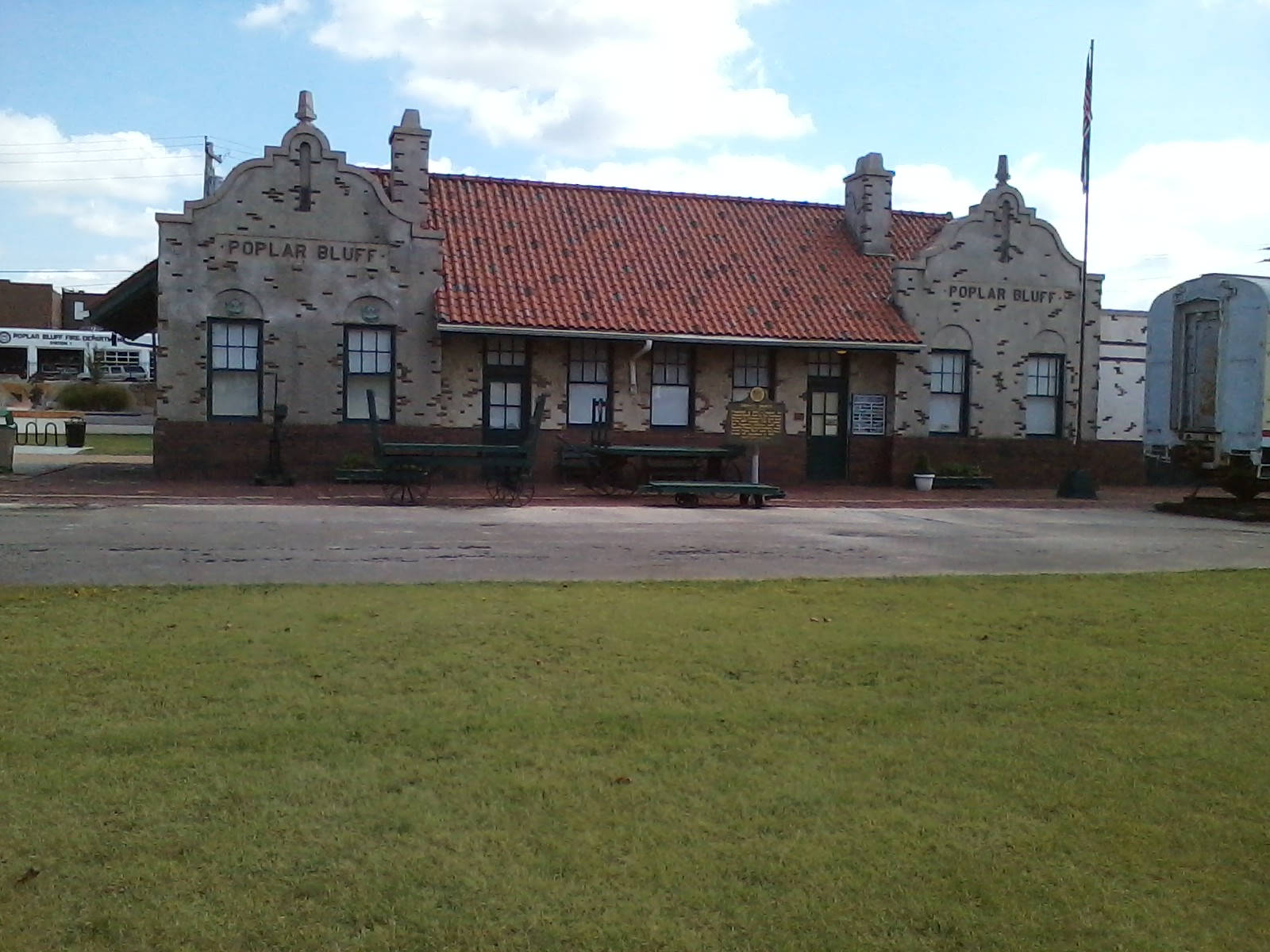
- St. Louis-San Francisco Railroad Depot, September 2013

- Location within Missouri Location within the United States
- Location: 303 Moran St., Poplar Bluff, Missouri
- Coordinates: 36°45′15″N 90°23′43″W
- Area: less than one acre
- Built: 1928
- Built by: Gephart Construction Co.
- Architectural style: Mission/spanish Revival
- MPS: Poplar Bluff MPS
- NRHP reference No.: 94001396
- Added to NRHP: December 1, 1994

St. Louis-San Francisco Railroad Depot is a historic train station located at Poplar Bluff, Butler County, Missouri. The station was built in 1928 by the St. Louis–San Francisco Railway. It is a one-story, Mission Revival style brick building sheathed in textured stucco. It sits on a concrete foundation, has a gable and hipped Spanish tile roof, and features two interior brick and stucco chimneys. The building is presently occupied as a railroad museum.

It was added to the National Register of Historic Places in 1994.

Preceding station	St. Louis–San Francisco Railway	Following station
Harviell toward Hoxie	Hoxie – Cape Girardeau	Calvin toward Cape Girardeau
