= Williams-Gierth House =

Historic house in Missouri, United States

- U.S. National Register of Historic Places
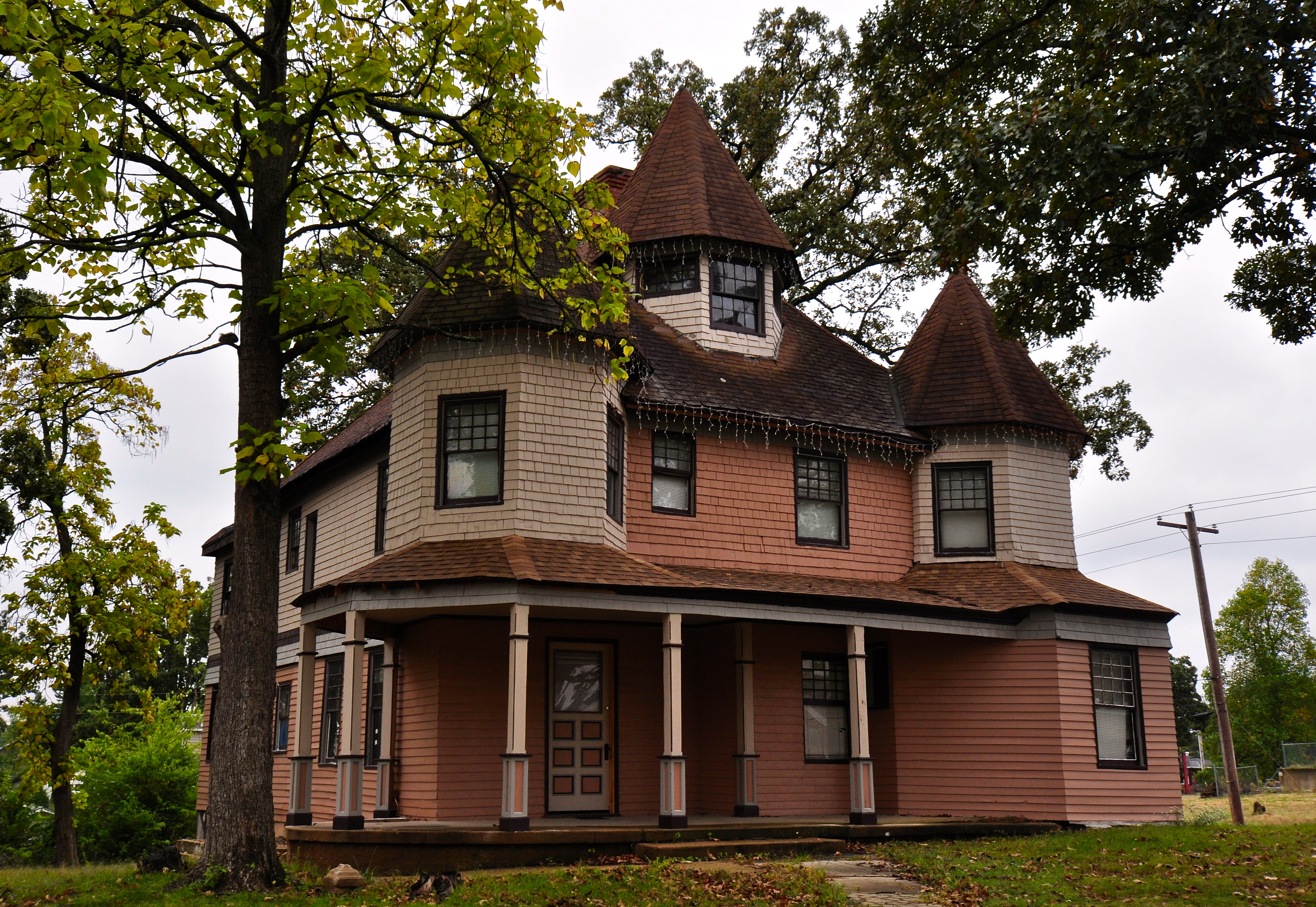
- Williams-Gierth House, October 2014

- Location within Missouri Location within the United States
- Location: 848 Vine St., Poplar Bluff, Missouri
- Coordinates: 36°45′27″N 90°24′04″W
- Area: Less than 1 acre (0.40 ha)
- Built: 1892
- Architectural style: Shingle Style
- MPS: Poplar Bluff MPS
- NRHP reference No.: 12000909
- Added to NRHP: November 6, 2012

Williams-Gierth House, also known as The Castle House, is a historic home located at Poplar Bluff, Butler County, Missouri. It was built in 1892, and is a large 2 1/2-story, irregular plan, Shingle Style dwelling. It features a reconstructed wraparound porch, two turrets, and a hipped roof with polygonal dormer.

It was added to the National Register of Historic Places in 2012.
