= Mark Twain School =

- U.S. National Register of Historic Places
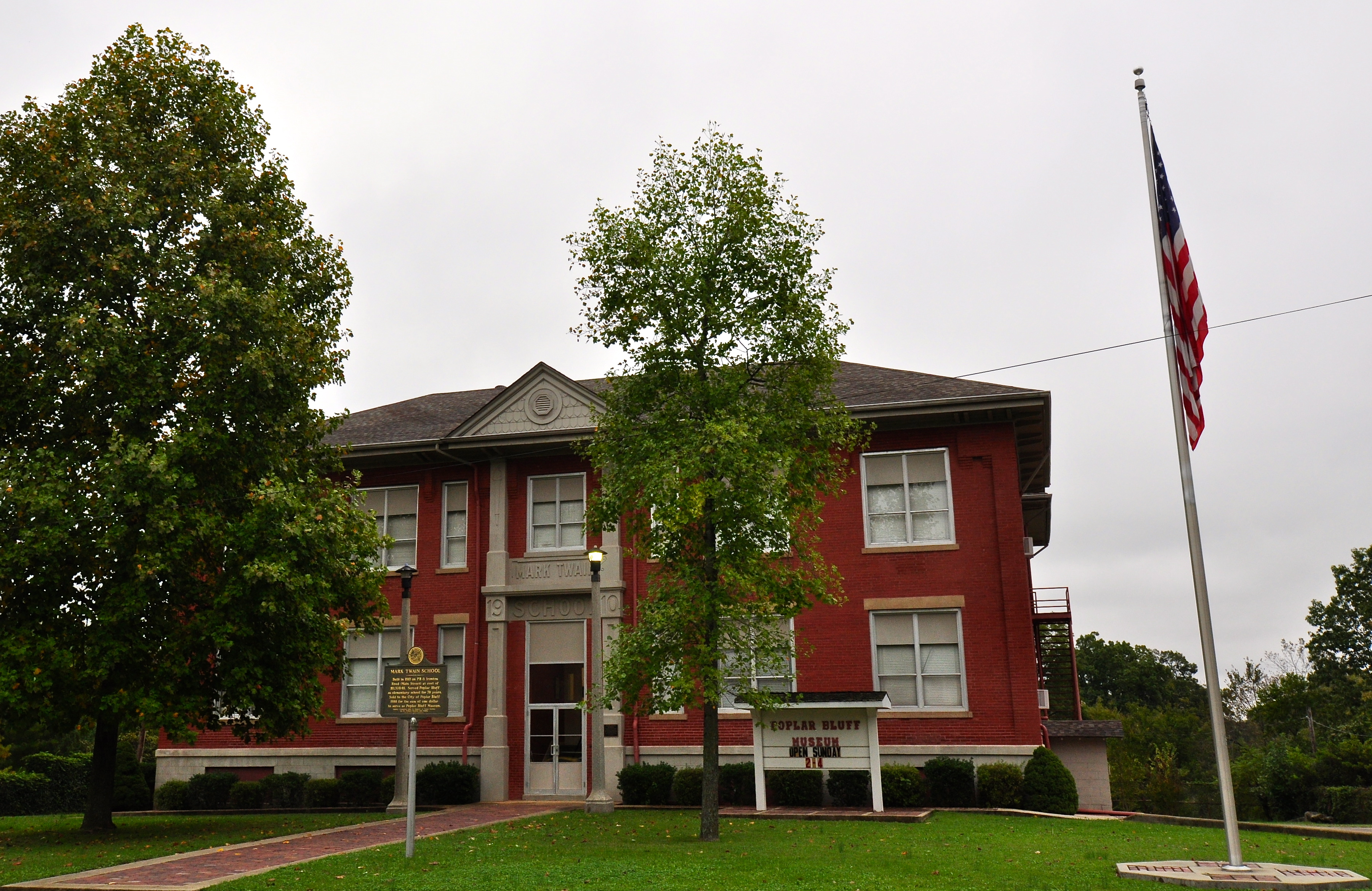
- Mark Twain School, October 2014

- Location within Missouri Location within the United States
- Location: 1012 N. Main St., Poplar Bluff, Missouri
- Coordinates: 36°45′58″N 90°24′4″W
- Area: less than one acre
- Built: 1910
- Architect: Walker, L.B.; Litton, J.W.
- Architectural style: Classical Revival
- MPS: Poplar Bluff MPS
- NRHP reference No.: 98000031
- Added to NRHP: February 5, 1998

Mark Twain School, also known as the Poplar Bluff Museum, is a historic school building located at Poplar Bluff, Butler County, Missouri. It was built in 1910, and is a two-story, "H"-plan, Classical Revival style brick building. The building consists of two, parallel, rectangular-plan, hipped roof blocks joined by an enclosed two-story flat roof corridor. It remained in use as an elementary school until 1988.

It was listed on the National Register of Historic Places in 1998.
