= North Main Street Historic District (Poplar Bluff, Missouri) =

Historic district in Missouri, United States

- U.S. National Register of Historic Places
- U.S. Historic district
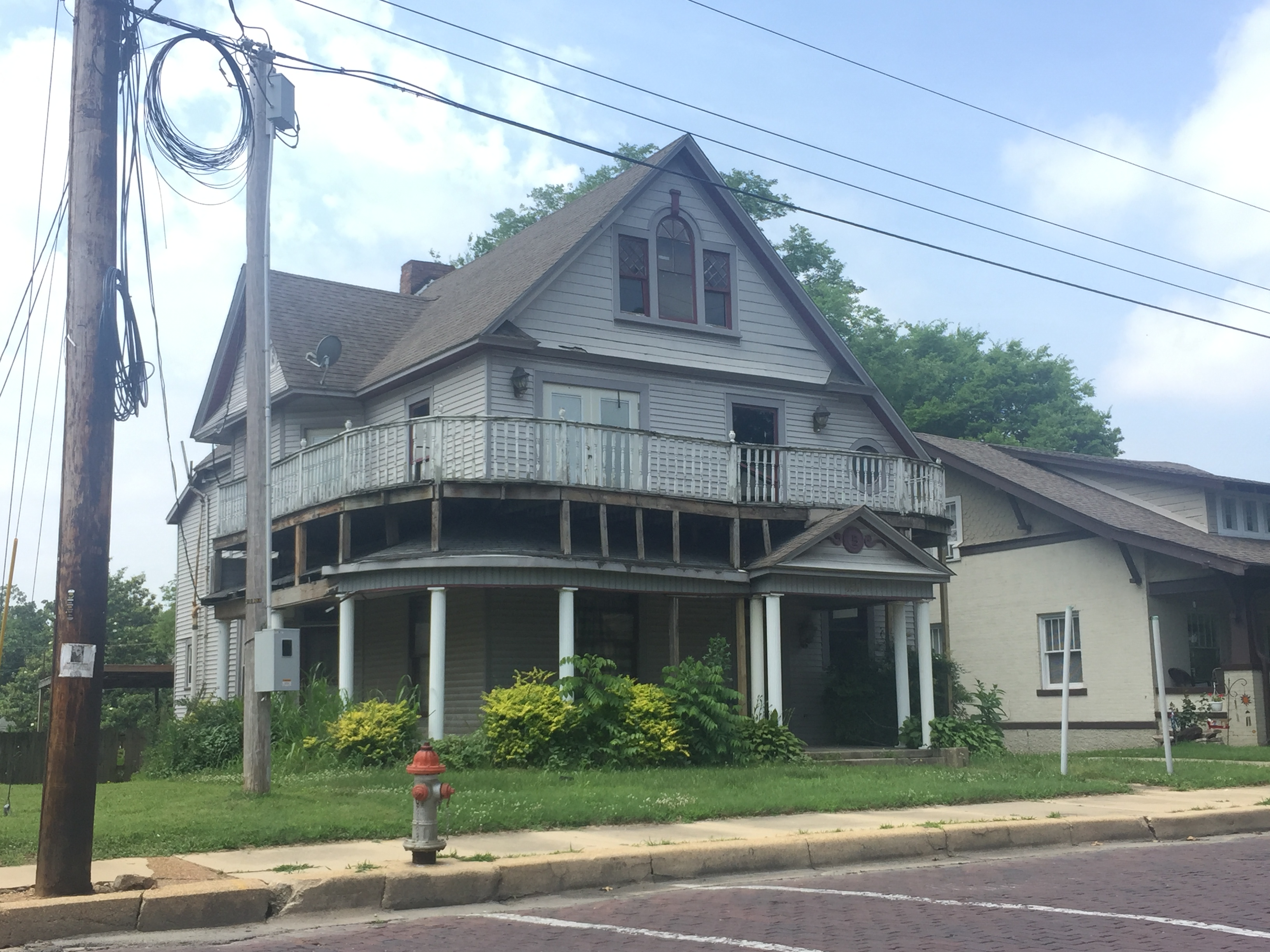
- 451 N. Main St.

- Location within Missouri Location within the United States
- Location: 400 block of N. Main St., Poplar Bluff, Missouri
- Coordinates: 36°45′38″N 90°23′40″W
- Area: 7.5 acres (3.0 ha)
- Built: 1880
- Built by: McKowan Brothers, Williams, Roy L.; Rohwer, Henry
- Architectural style: Queen Anne, Neo-Classical Revival, Colonial Revival, Late Gothic Revival, Bungalow/Craftsman
- NRHP reference No.: 11000440
- Added to NRHP: July 14, 2011

North Main Street Historic District is a national historic district located at Poplar Bluff, Butler County, Missouri. It encompasses 19 contributing buildings and 1 contributing structure in a predominantly residential section of Poplar Bluff. The district developed between about 1880 and 1954, and includes representative examples of Queen Anne, Neo-Classical Revival, Colonial Revival, Late Gothic Revival, and Bungalow / American Craftsman style architecture. Located in the district is the separately listed Moore-Dalton House. Other notable buildings include the Holy Cross Episcopal Church (c. 1902) and the Zion Lutheran Church (c. 1947).

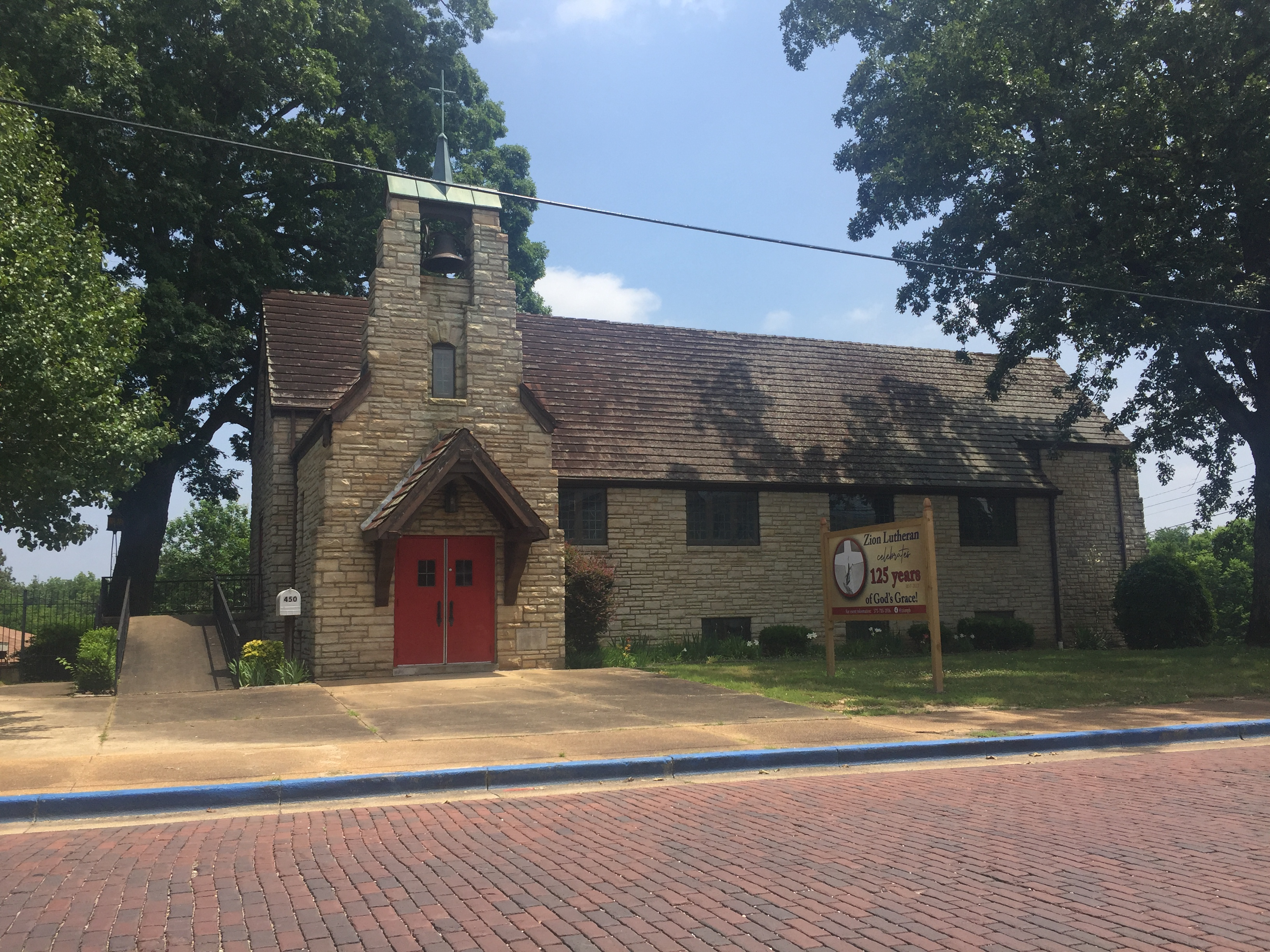
Zion Lutheran Church

It was added to the National Register of Historic Places in 2011.
