= J. Herbert Moore House =

Historic house in Missouri, United States

- U.S. National Register of Historic Places
- U.S. Historic district – Contributing property
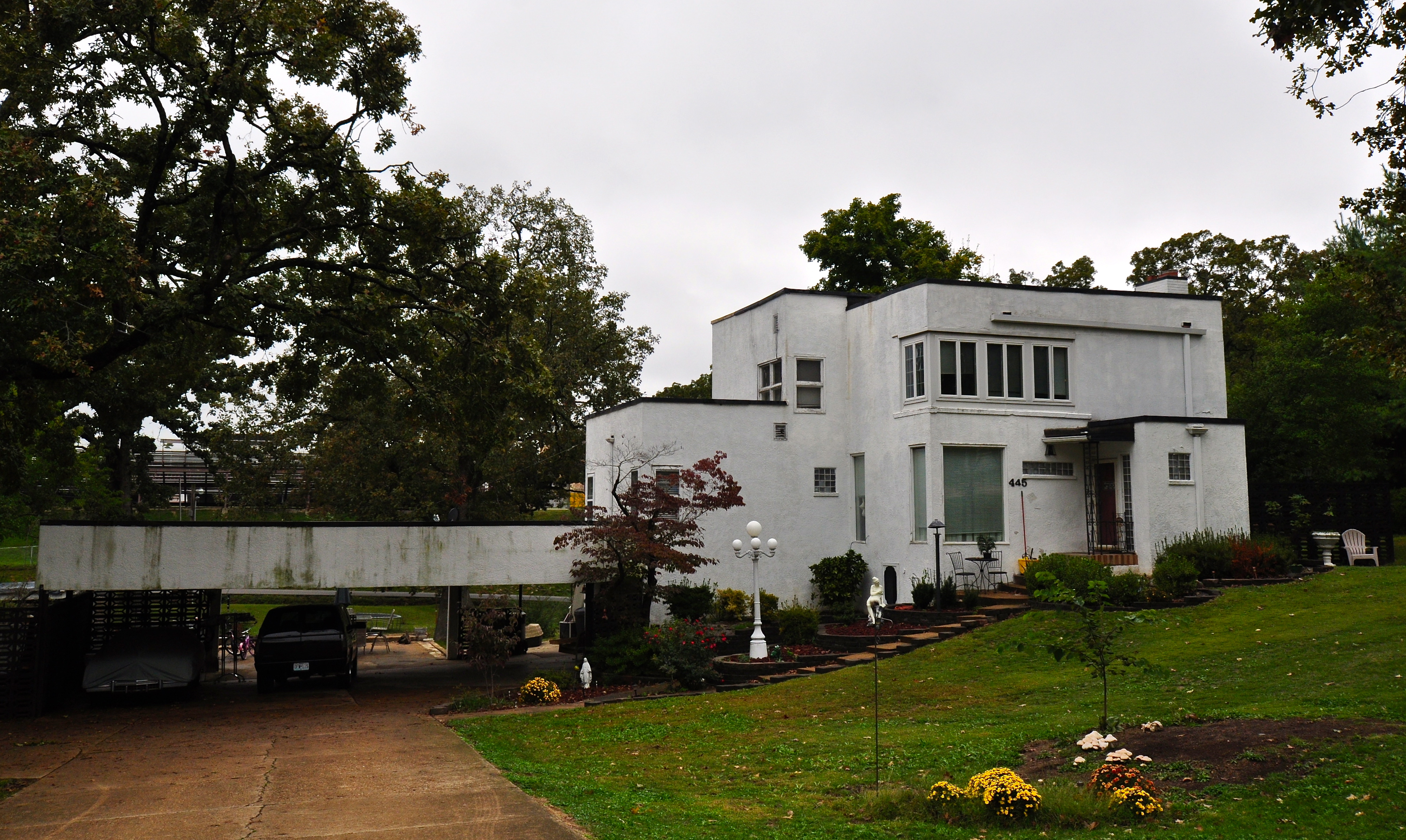
- J. Herbert Moore House, October 2014

- Location within Missouri Location within the United States
- Location: 445 N. Eleventh St., Poplar Bluff, Missouri
- Coordinates: 36°45′40″N 90°22′20″W
- Area: less than one acre
- Built: 1938
- Built by: Moore, J. Herbert
- Architectural style: International Style
- MPS: Poplar Bluff MPS
- NRHP reference No.: 98000032
- Added to NRHP: February 12, 1998

J. Herbert Moore House is a historic home located at Poplar Bluff, Butler County, Missouri. It was built in 1938, and is a two-story, irregular plan, International Style dwelling of wood and concrete construction with a stuccoed exterior. It has an attached garage and carport. It features original multi-light steel casement windows and original structural glass blocks.

It was listed on the National Register of Historic Places in 1998. It is located in the Cynthia-Kinzer Historic District.
