= Wright-Dalton-Bell-Anchor Department Store Building =

- U.S. National Register of Historic Places
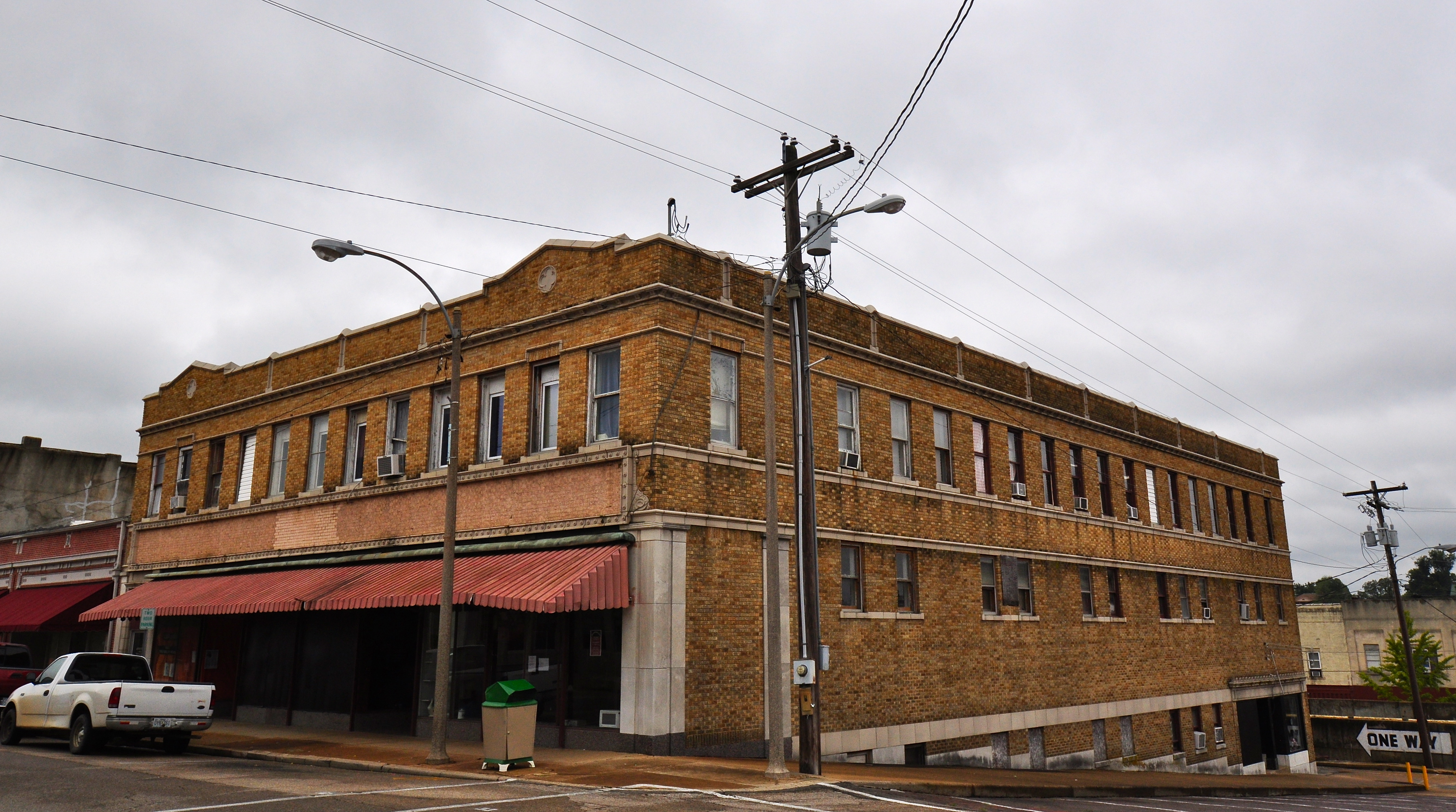
- Wright-Dalton-Bell-Anchor Department Store Building, October 2014

- Location within Missouri Location within the United States
- Location: 201–205 S. Main, Poplar Bluff, Missouri
- Coordinates: 36°45′19″N 90°23′37″W
- Area: less than one acre
- Built: 1927–1928
- Architect: Campen, C.A.
- Architectural style: Early Commercial, Two-part commercial block
- MPS: Poplar Bluff MPS
- NRHP reference No.: 06000247
- Added to NRHP: April 12, 2006

Wright-Dalton-Bell-Anchor Department Store Building, also known as the Dalton Store and F.W. Woolworth Store, is a historic commercial building located at Poplar Bluff, Butler County, Missouri. It was built in 1927–1928, and is a two-to three-story, rectangular brick building with terracotta embellishments. It features shaped parapets with terracotta coping and quatrefoil insets and a decorative terracotta signboard and storefront surround. An F.W. Woolworth store occupied the building from 1947 to about 1987.

It was added to the National Register of Historic Places in 2006.
