= Poplar Bluff Commercial Historic District =

Historic district in Missouri, United States

- U.S. National Register of Historic Places
- U.S. Historic district
- Location within Missouri Location within the United States
- Location: Roughly, S. Broadway from Cedar St. to Vine St. and Vine from Fifth St. to S. Broadway, Poplar Bluff, Missouri
- Coordinates: 36°45′21″N 90°23′40″W
- Area: 7.1 acres (2.9 ha)
- Architectural style: Italianate, Colonial Revival
- MPS: Poplar Bluff MPS
- NRHP reference No.: 94001401
- Added to NRHP: December 1, 1994

Poplar Bluff Commercial Historic District is a national historic district located at Poplar Bluff, Butler County, Missouri. It encompasses 14 contributing commercial buildings in the central business district of Poplar Bluff. The district developed between about 1880 and 1930s, and includes representative examples of Italianate and Colonial Revival style architecture. Notable buildings include the Fraternal Building (1928) and Begley Building (1908).

It was added to the National Register of Historic Places in 1994.
