= Butler County Courthouse (Missouri) =

- U.S. National Register of Historic Places
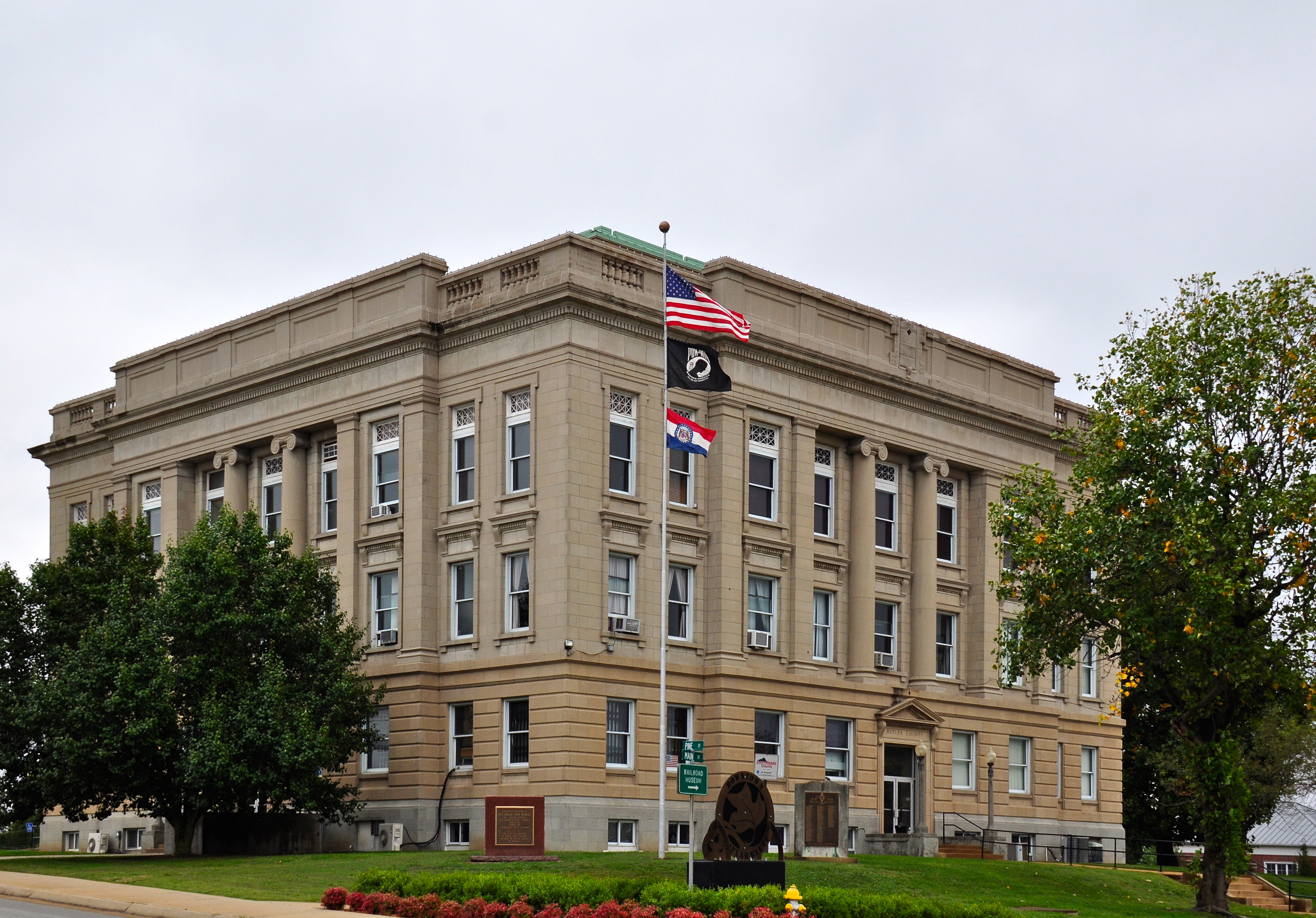
- Butler County Courthouse, October 2014

- Location within Missouri Location within the United States
- Location: Public Sq., Poplar Bluff, Missouri
- Coordinates: 36°45′23″N 90°23′32″W
- Area: less than one acre
- Built: 1928
- Built by: Gassman Construction Co.
- Architect: N.S. Spencer and Son
- Architectural style: Classical Revival
- MPS: Poplar Bluff MPS
- NRHP reference No.: 94001400
- Added to NRHP: December 1, 1994

Butler County Courthouse is a historic courthouse located at Poplar Bluff, Butler County, Missouri. It was built in 1928, and is a three-story, Classical Revival style brick building of cast concrete construction. Each side is nine bays wide, with the central five bays having two-story engaged Doric order columns and pilasters on the top two floors.

It was added to the National Register of Historic Places in 1994.
