= Moore-Dalton House =

Historic house in Missouri, United States

- U.S. National Register of Historic Places
- U.S. Historic district – Contributing property
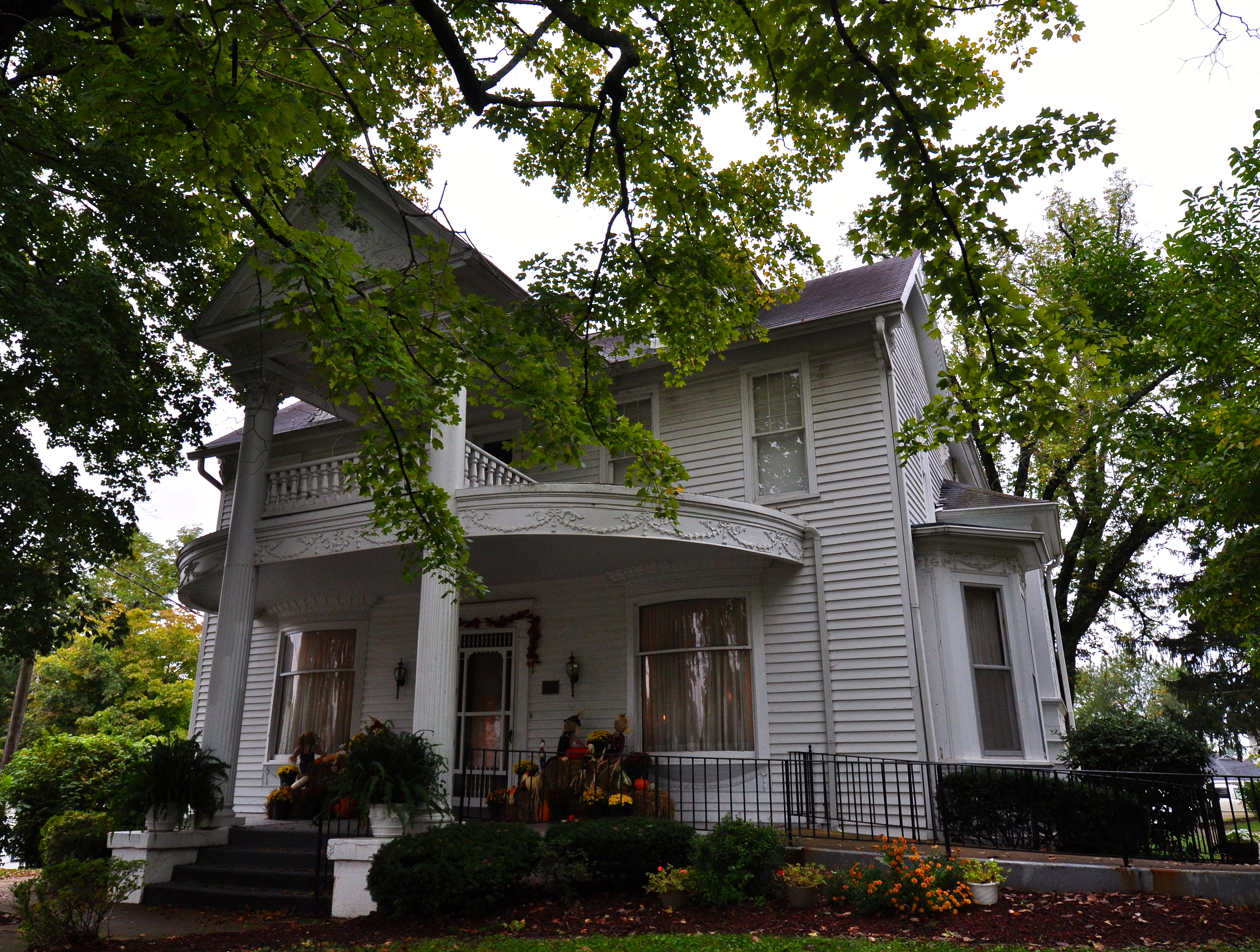
- Moore-Dalton House, October 2014

- Location within Missouri Location within the United States
- Location: 421 N. Main St., Poplar Bluff, Missouri
- Coordinates: 36°45′35″N 90°23′38″W
- Area: less than one acre
- Built: 1896
- Architectural style: Classical Revival
- MPS: Poplar Bluff MPS
- NRHP reference No.: 94001398
- Added to NRHP: December 1, 1994

Moore-Dalton House, also known as the Margaret Harwell Art Museum, is a historic home located at Poplar Bluff, Butler County, Missouri. It was originally built in 1883, and remodeled to its present form in 1896. It is a two-story, frame dwelling on a brick and stone foundation. It features a Classical Revival style semi-circular front portico with fluted Ionic columns and a second story balcony. The house was converted to an art museum by the city of Poplar Bluff in 1979.

It was listed on the National Register of Historic Places in 1994. It is located in the North Main Street Historic District.
