= Cynthia–Kinzer Historic District =

Historic district in Missouri, United States

- U.S. National Register of Historic Places
- U.S. Historic district
- Location within Missouri Location within the United States
- Location: 900–1000 blocks of Cynthia & Kinzer, 918–924 Maud & 838–842 Kinzer Sts., Poplar Bluff, Missouri
- Coordinates: 36°45′40″N 90°24′16″W
- Area: 24 acres (9.7 ha)
- Built: c. 1907
- Built by: Tetwiler, Charles; Mopps, Homer
- Architectural style: Colonial Revival, Tudor Revival, Bungalow/Craftsman, International Style
- NRHP reference No.: 15000441
- Added to NRHP: July 21, 2015

Cynthia–Kinzer Historic District is a national historic district located around Cynthia and Kinzer Streets, Poplar Bluff, Missouri. It encompasses 55 contributing buildings 1 contributing site, and 17 contributing structures in a predominantly residential section of Poplar Bluff. The district developed between about 1907 and 1961, and includes representative examples of Colonial Revival, Tudor Revival, Bungalow / American Craftsman, and International style architecture. Located in the district are the separately listed Alfred W. Greer House and J. Herbert Moore House. Other notable buildings include the Fred Anderson House (c. 1908), Hubert C. Roland House (c. 1922), Lyle Kutchback House (c. 1915), Lawrence and Alma Tedrick House (c. 1915), C.P. Schultz House (c. 1925), J. Truman and Lena Carter House (c. 1944), Carl Capps House (c. 1958), and James and Nelda McPheeters House (c. 1961).

It was added to the National Register of Historic Places in 2015.
