= Alfred W. Greer House =

Historic house in Missouri, United States

- U.S. National Register of Historic Places
- U.S. Historic district – Contributing property
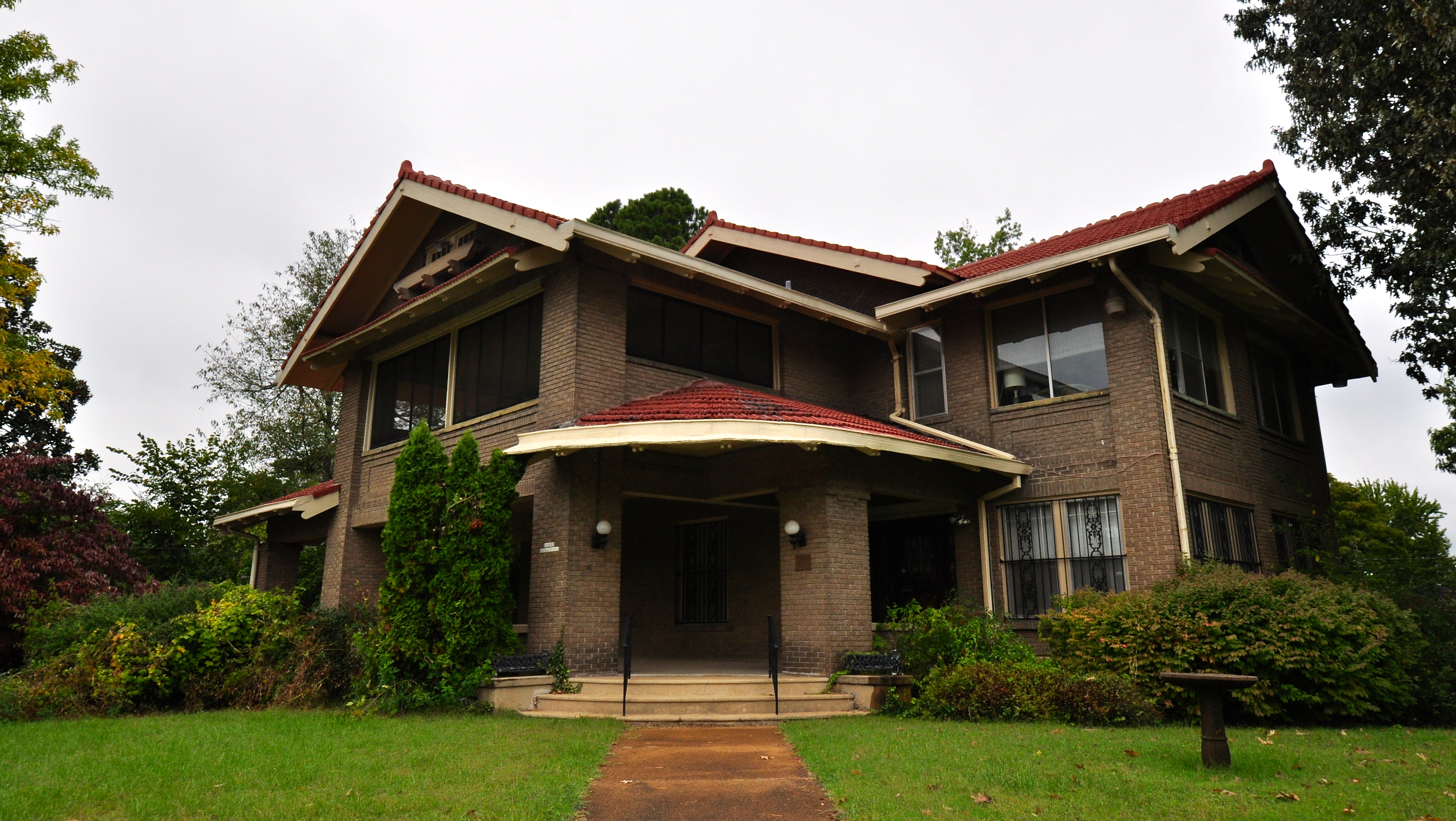
- Alfred W. Greer House, October 2014

- Location within Missouri Location within the United States
- Location: 955 Kinzer St., Poplar Bluff, Missouri
- Coordinates: 36°45′39″N 90°24′10″W
- Area: less than one acre
- Built: 1915
- Architectural style: Late 19th And 20th Century Revivals, Bungalow/craftsman
- MPS: Poplar Bluff MPS
- NRHP reference No.: 98000029
- Added to NRHP: February 12, 1998

Alfred W. Greer House is a historic home located at Poplar Bluff, Butler County, Missouri. It was built in 1915, and is a 2 1/2-story, rectangular plan, American Craftsman style brick dwelling with a 2 1/2-story side wing. It has a gable roof with wide eaves and exposed rafters and features large brick porch piers on the main facade.

It was listed on the National Register of Historic Places in 1998. It is located in the Cynthia-Kinzer Historic District.
