= Poplar Bluff Public Library =

- U.S. National Register of Historic Places
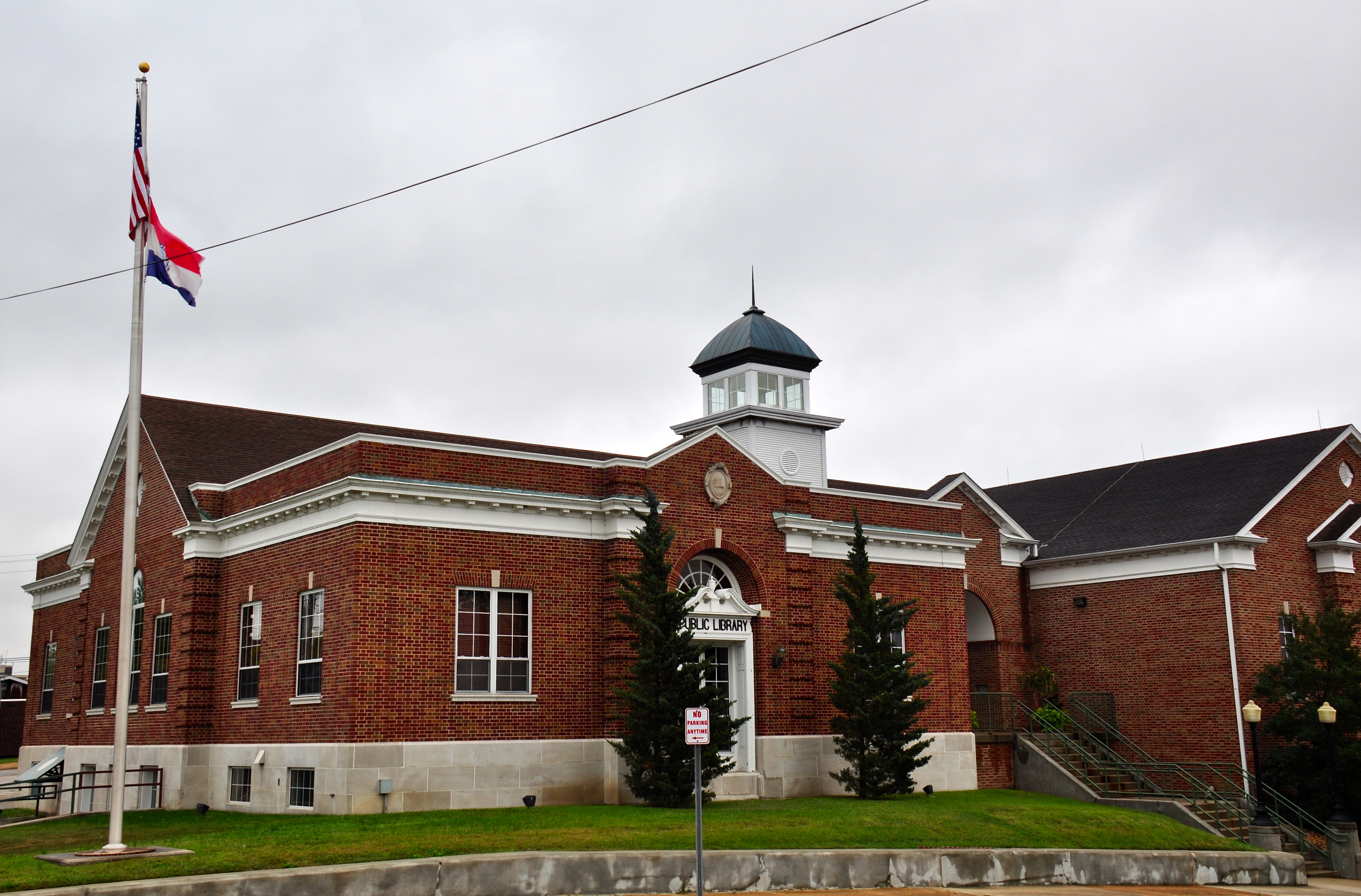
- Poplar Bluff Public Library, October 2014

- Location within Missouri Location within the United States
- Location: 318 N. Main St., Poplar Bluff, Missouri
- Coordinates: 36°45′29″N 90°23′32″W
- Area: less than one acre
- Built: 1936
- Built by: Rhinehart Construction Co.
- Architect: Pleitsch and Price
- Architectural style: Colonial Revival
- MPS: Poplar Bluff MPS
- NRHP reference No.: 94001399
- Added to NRHP: December 1, 1994

Poplar Bluff Municipal Library (Poplar Bluff Public Library) is a historic library building located at Poplar Bluff, Butler County, Missouri. It was built in 1936, and is a one-story, Colonial Revival style brick building. It sits on a full basement and has a gable roof.

It was added to the National Register of Historic Places in 1994.

The Poplar Bluff Municipal Library District can trace its beginnings back to Mrs. M. C. Horton, president of the Poplar Bluff Bay View Reading Club, who held a meeting in her home in 1915 to discuss the possibility of a free public library to serve Poplar Bluff and its citizens. A year later, on April 25, 1916, a membership library opened in the basement of the Criterion Theater staffed with 14 volunteers. Members paid $1 per year for access to this collection. The hours at first were from two to five p.m. on Tuesdays, Thursdays, and Saturdays.

This library proved so popular that in 1917, a library mill tax was passed and Poplar Bluff had its first public library. After beginning in the basement of the Criterion Theater, the library moved locations several times before landing in its permanent home on Main Street. The building at 318 North Main Street was constructed in 1936 at a cost of $50,000 using a combination of federal and local monies for the purpose of housing a free public library. The Missouri Library Association held its annual statewide conference at the Poplar Bluff Library when it opened its doors in Oct.1936. At the time, the library was touted as being state of the art with electric lights and a three hundred seat auditorium.

In 1998 and 2008, the library’s home was expanded and renovated, respectively, doubling the size of the original 1936 building and more than tripling the size of the 1967 Children’s Library. The building now sits at 21,000 square feet and offers a collection of more than 70,000 volumes, access to public computers, and free and unlimited Wi-Fi.

In June 2012, ninety-five years after the community first dedicated funding for the purpose of a library, Poplar Bluff placed its values on a democratic society that has access to free and open information when they passed a quarter-cent sales tax to ensure the future of the Poplar Bluff Library. This revenue tripled the library’s budget and provides greater access to the library’s services and collections.

In November 2019, the library purchased a 4,000 square foot building at 3398 Kanell Blvd to serve as a branch library. In November 2020, the library named this branch The Dr. Gus T. Ridgel Branch Library in honor of a prominent Poplar Bluff native, Dr. Gus T. Ridgel.

== A History of Library Locations ==
1. April 25, 1916 - July 1919: Basement of the Criterion Theater (northwest corner of Pine Blvd and Main Street)
2. July 1919 - April 1930: Corner of Pine & Broadway (currently the site of Rodgers Theater)
3. April 1930 - December 1935 - The Elk's Home on the corner of Poplar and 2nd Streets (210 Poplar - currently the site of the Daily American Republic newspaper)
4. December 1935 - August 1936: The Fraternal Opera Building (northwest corner of Broadway and Poplar streets across from the Downtown Free Parking Garage)
5. September 11, 1936 - Present Day: 318 North Main Street
6. November 2019 - Present - Dr. Gus T. Ridgel Branch at 3398 Kanell Blvd

== Librarians ==
1. Miss Lucy Horton (1916-1918)
2. Mrs. J. L. Lindsay (1918-1935)
3. Mrs. Agnes Maske (1935-1936)
4. Mrs. Helen Cain (1936-1964)
5. Mr. Dewayne Beckemeir (1976-1998)
6. Mrs. Jackie Thomas (1998-2012)
7. Mrs. Sue Crites Szostak (2013-Present)
