= Thomas Moore House (Poplar Bluff, Missouri) =

Historic house in Missouri, United States

- U.S. National Register of Historic Places
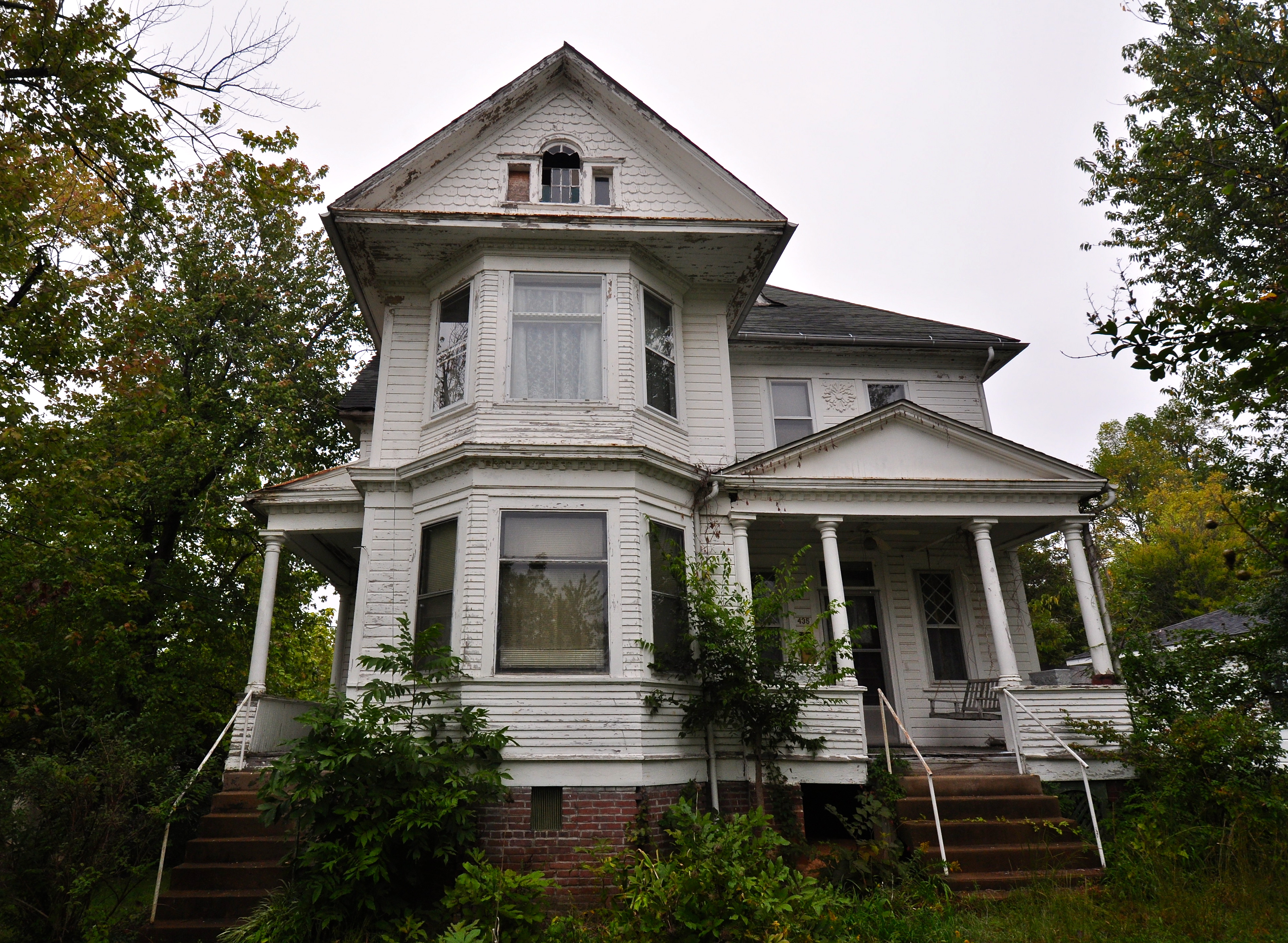
- Thomas Moore House, October 2014.

- Location within Missouri Location within the United States
- Location: 435 Lester St., Poplar Bluff, Missouri
- Coordinates: 36°45′35″N 90°23′39″W
- Area: less than one acre
- Built: 1896
- Architectural style: Queen Anne, Colonial Revival
- MPS: Poplar Bluff MPS
- NRHP reference No.: 98000033
- Added to NRHP: February 12, 1998

Thomas Moore House is a historic home located at Poplar Bluff, Butler County, Missouri. It was built in 1896, and is a 2 1/2-story, irregular plan, Queen Anne style frame dwelling with Colonial Revival influenced detailing. It has a hipped and gable roof and features a projecting polygonal, two-story bay.

It was listed on the National Register of Historic Places in 1998.
