= Zehe Building =

- U.S. National Register of Historic Places
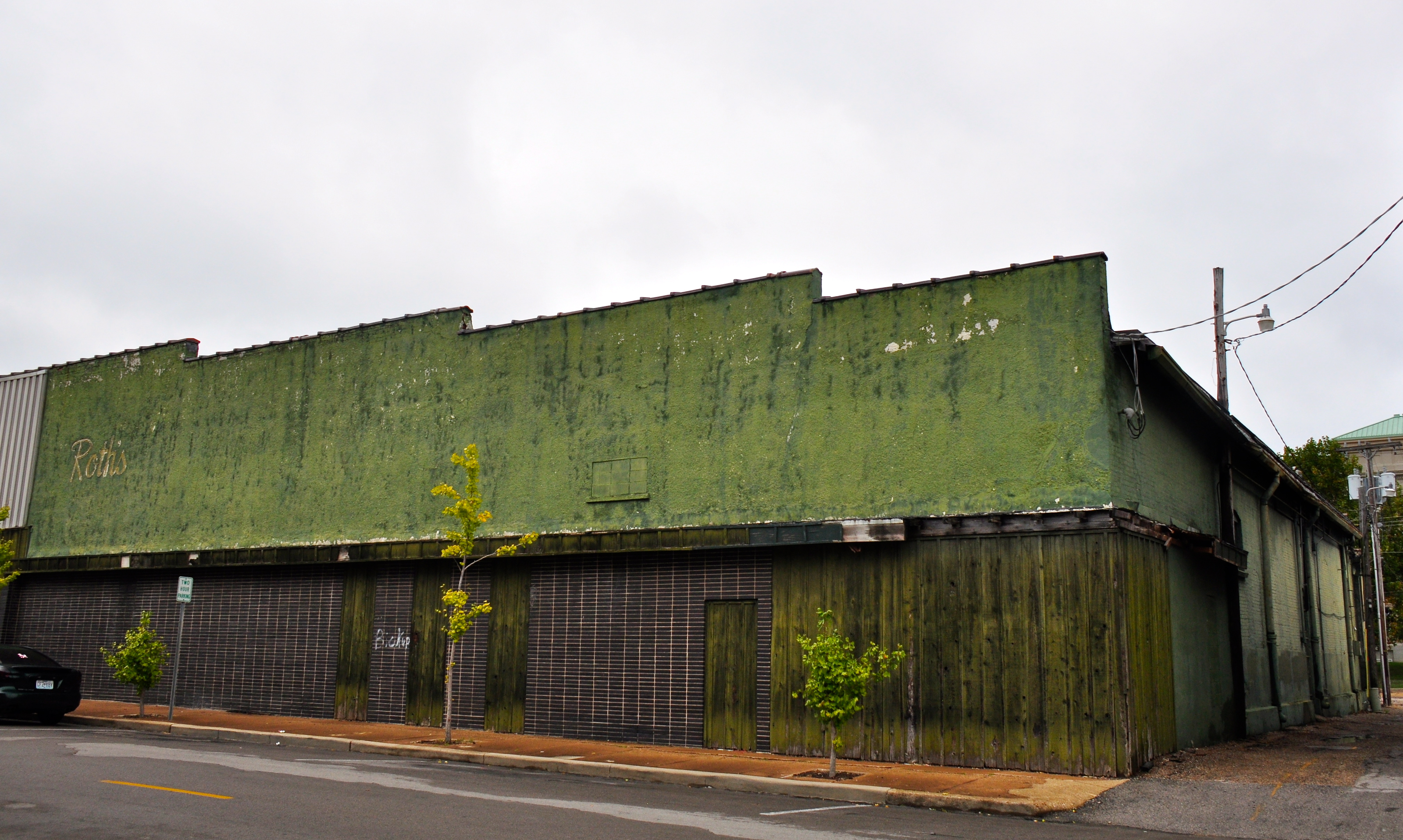
- Zehe Building, October 2014

- Location within Missouri Location within the United States
- Location: 203 Poplar St., Poplar Bluff, Missouri
- Coordinates: 36°45′20″N 90°23′32″W
- Area: less than one acre
- Built: 1911
- Architectural style: Colonial Revival
- MPS: Poplar Bluff MPS
- NRHP reference No.: 94001402
- Added to NRHP: December 1, 1994

Zehe Building, also known as the Ozark Hotel, was a historic commercial building located at Poplar Bluff, Butler County, Missouri. It was built in 1911, and is a three-story, rectangular brick building with Colonial Revival style design influences. It had a hipped roof and sits on a stone and concrete foundation. The central bay of the front facade features concrete balconies on both upper floors. The building contained a hotel and other businesses until the 1980s. As of 1/2018 it no longer exists.

It was added to the National Register of Historic Places in 1994.
