= John Archibald Phillips House =

Historic house in Missouri, United States

- U.S. National Register of Historic Places
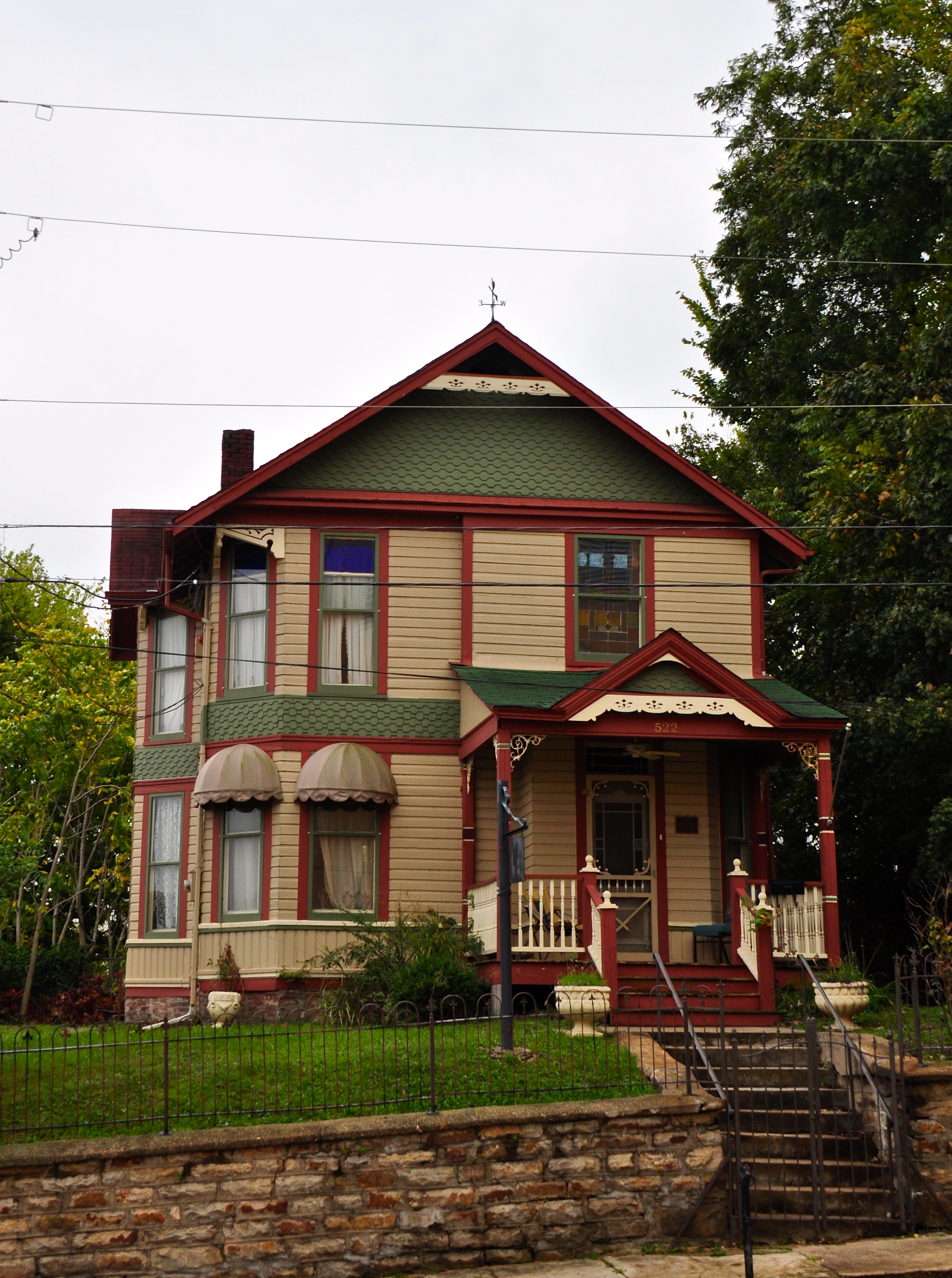
- John Archibald Phillips House, October 2014

- Location within Missouri Location within the United States
- Location: 522 Cherry St., Poplar Bluff, Missouri
- Coordinates: 36°45′14″N 90°23′50″W
- Area: less than one acre
- Built: 1891
- Architectural style: Queen Anne
- MPS: Poplar Bluff MPS
- NRHP reference No.: 98000034
- Added to NRHP: February 12, 1998

John Archibald Phillips House is an historic home located at Poplar Bluff, Butler County, Missouri. It was built in 1891, and is a 2 1/2-story, irregular plan, Queen Anne style frame dwelling. It has a gable roof with fishscale shingles on the gable end and features a one-story, shed roof entry porch with milled and chamfered columns. Surrounding the house is an original cast-iron fence. The house was acquired by the Butler County Historical Society in 1985 to serve as a house museum and meeting space.

It was listed on the National Register of Historic Places in 1998.
