= South Sixth Street Historic District =

Historic district in Missouri, United States

- U.S. National Register of Historic Places
- U.S. Historic district
- Location within Missouri Location within the United States
- Location: 205-225-303 S. Sixth St., Poplar Bluff, Missouri
- Coordinates: 36°45′21″N 90°23′50″W
- Area: 1.4 acres (0.57 ha)
- Built: 1884
- Architectural style: Italianate, Colonial Revival
- MPS: Poplar Bluff MPS
- NRHP reference No.: 98000035
- Added to NRHP: February 12, 1998

South Sixth Street Historic District is a national historic district located at Poplar Bluff, Butler County, Missouri. It encompasses four contributing buildings and two contributing structures in a residential section of Poplar Bluff. The district developed between about 1880 and 1917, and includes representative examples of Italianate and Colonial Revival style architecture. Notable buildings include the Luke F. Quinn House (1884), the Warren S. Randall House (1889), and John C. Corrigan House (1917).

It was added to the National Register of Historic Places in 1998.
