= Williamson-Kennedy School =

- U.S. National Register of Historic Places
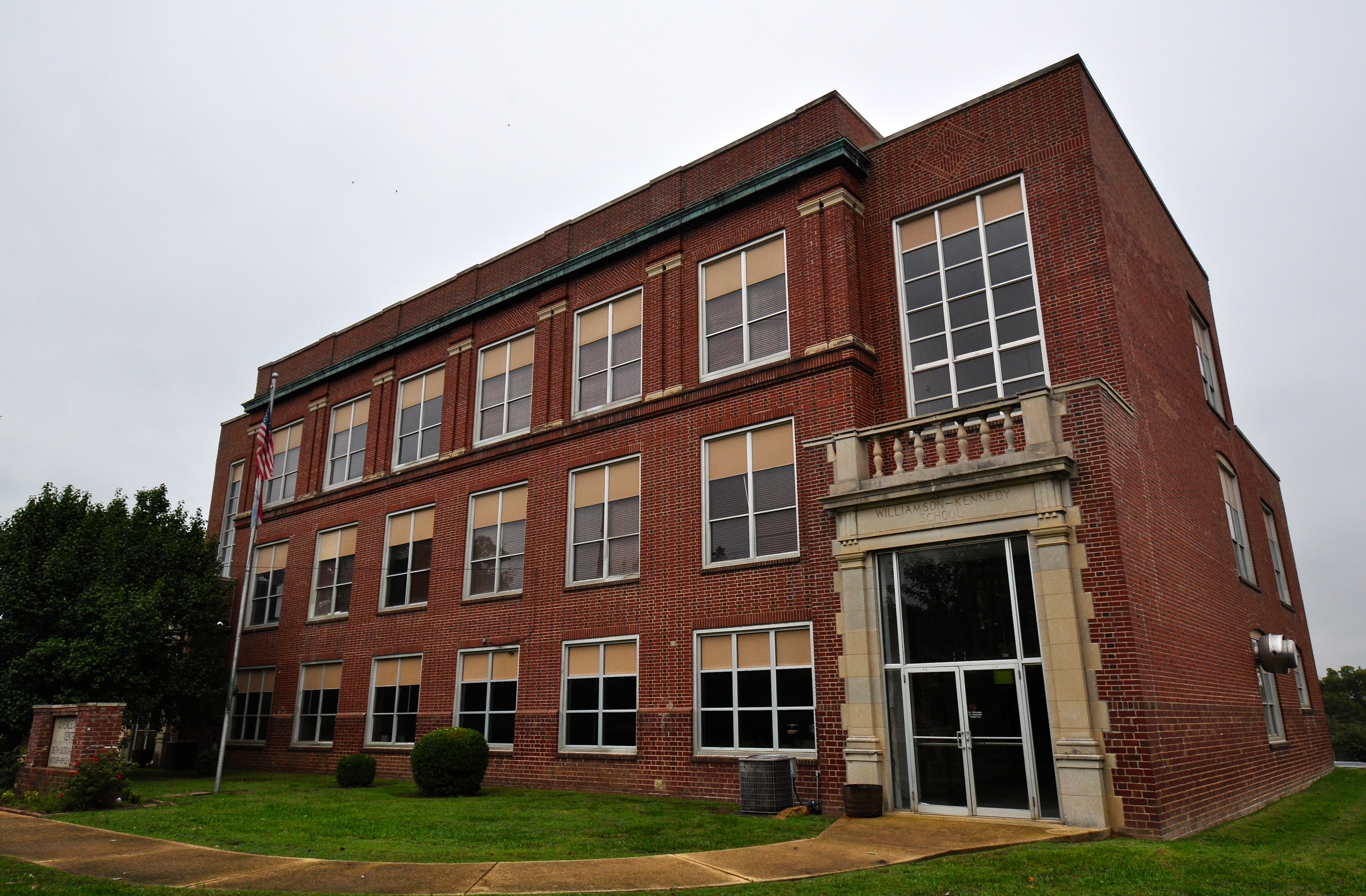
- Williamson-Kennedy School, October 2014

- Location within Missouri Location within the United States
- Location: 614 Lindsay St., Poplar Bluff, Missouri
- Coordinates: 36°45′38″N 90°23′30″W
- Area: 2 acres (0.81 ha)
- Built: 1922
- Architectural style: Colonial Revival
- MPS: Poplar Bluff MPS
- NRHP reference No.: 98000036
- Added to NRHP: February 12, 1998

Williamson-Kennedy School is a historic school building located at Poplar Bluff, Butler County, Missouri. It was built in 1922, and is a three-story, rectangular plan, Colonial Revival style brick building. It sits on a cast concrete foundation and has a flat roof. The two primary entrances located in one-story projecting wings at the corners of the building and features cast concrete Doric orderpilasters.

It was listed on the National Register of Historic Places in 1998.
