= Poplar Bluff, Missouri =

City in Missouri, U.S.

- City
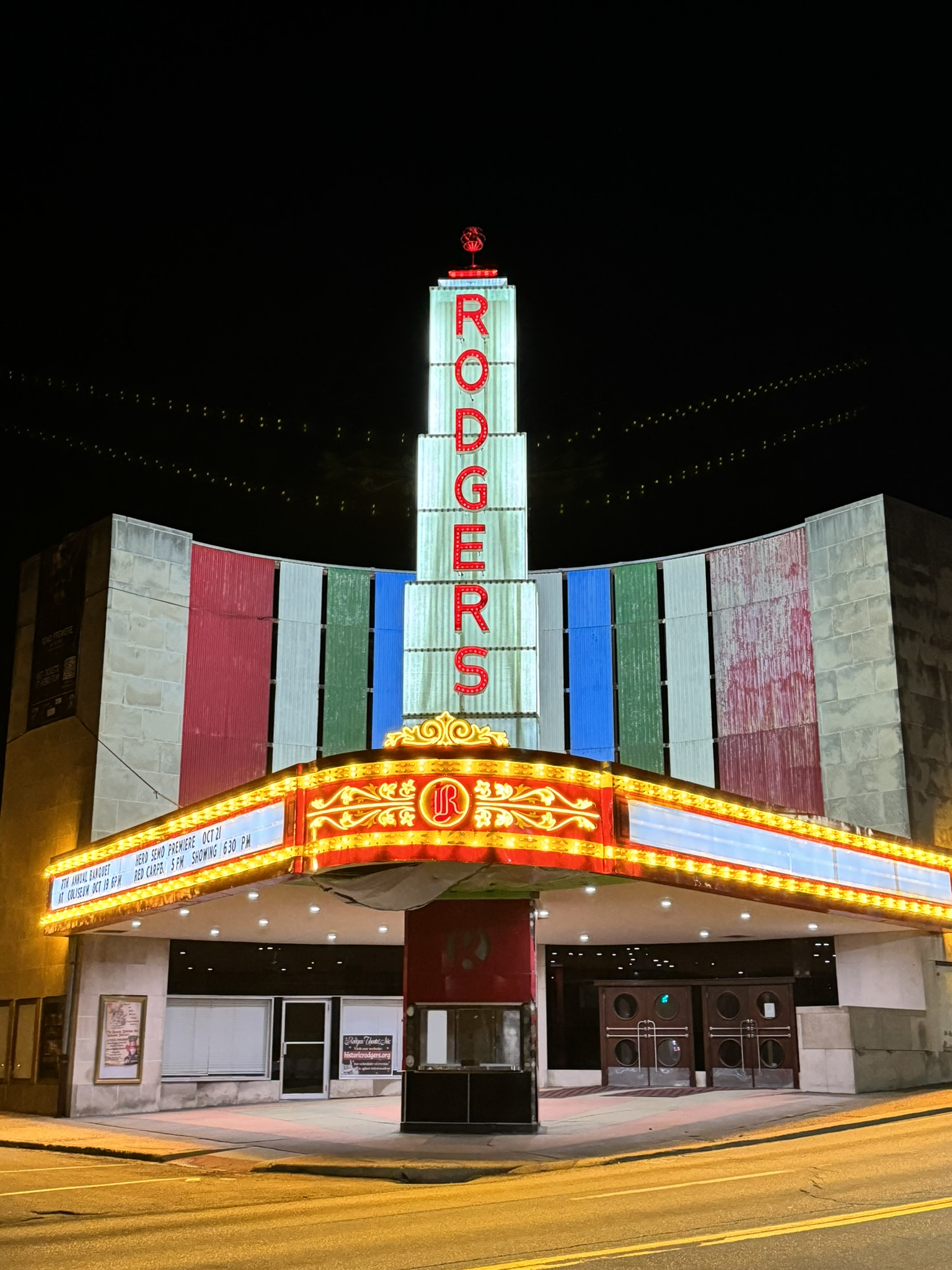
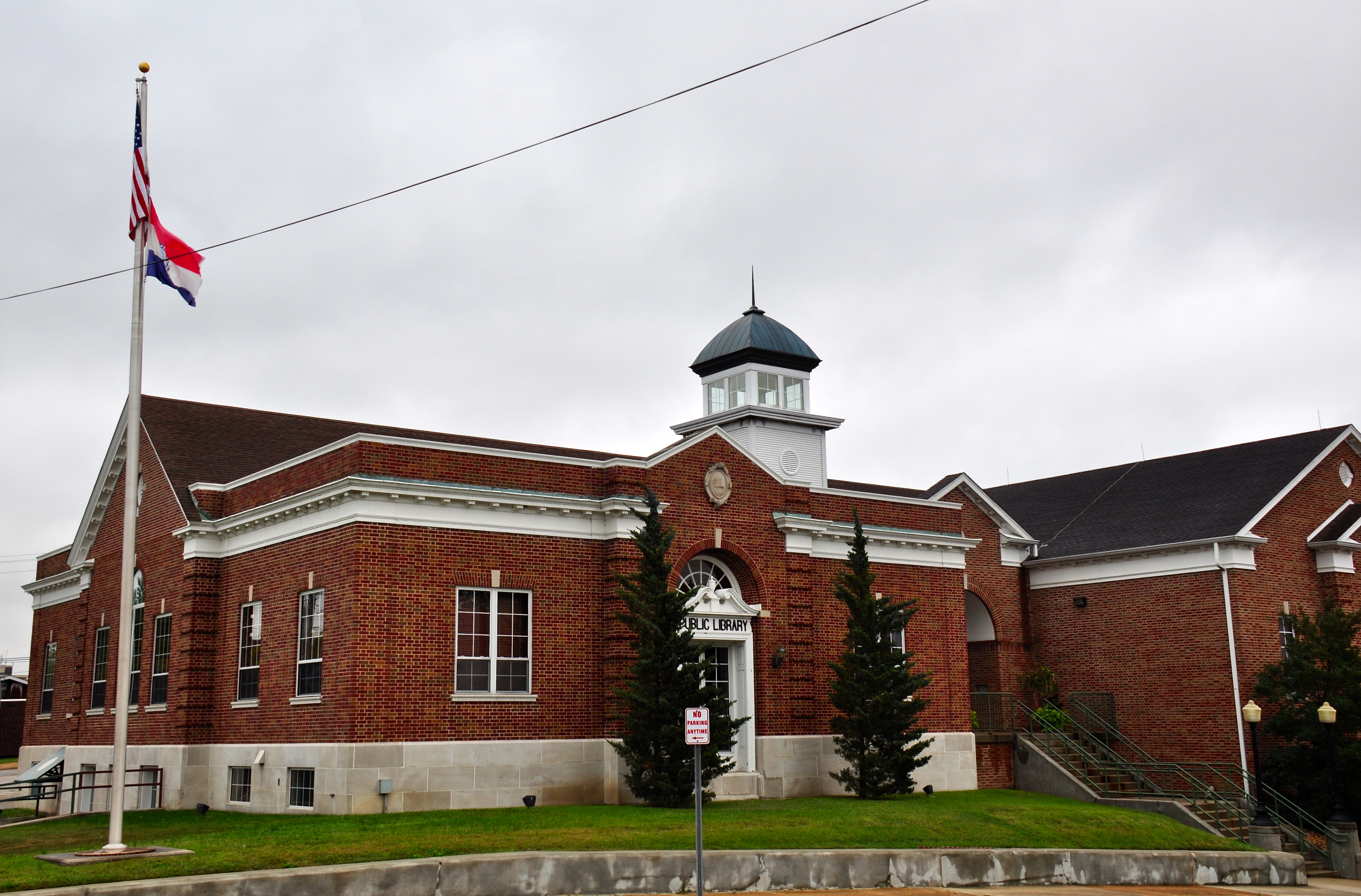
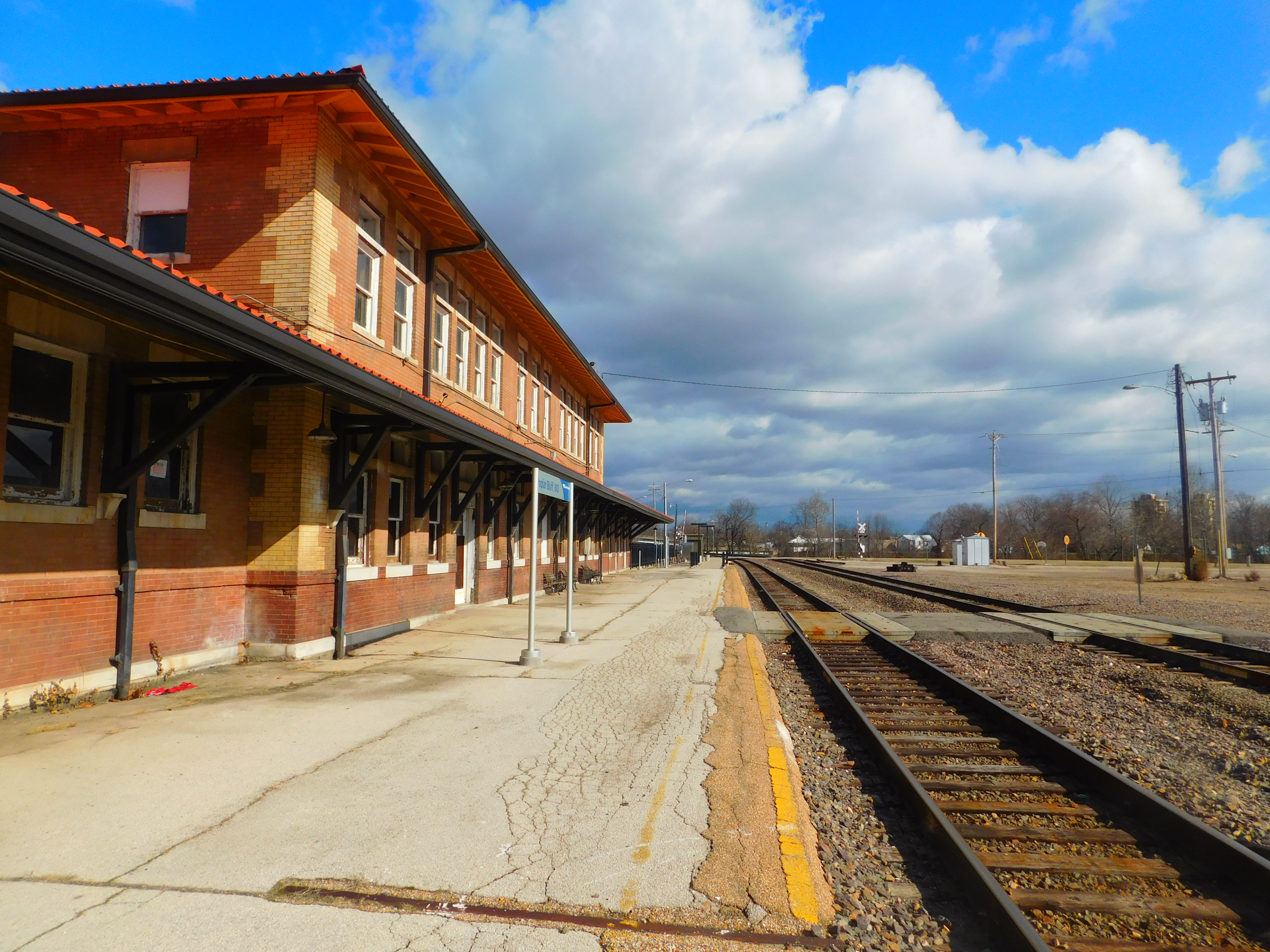
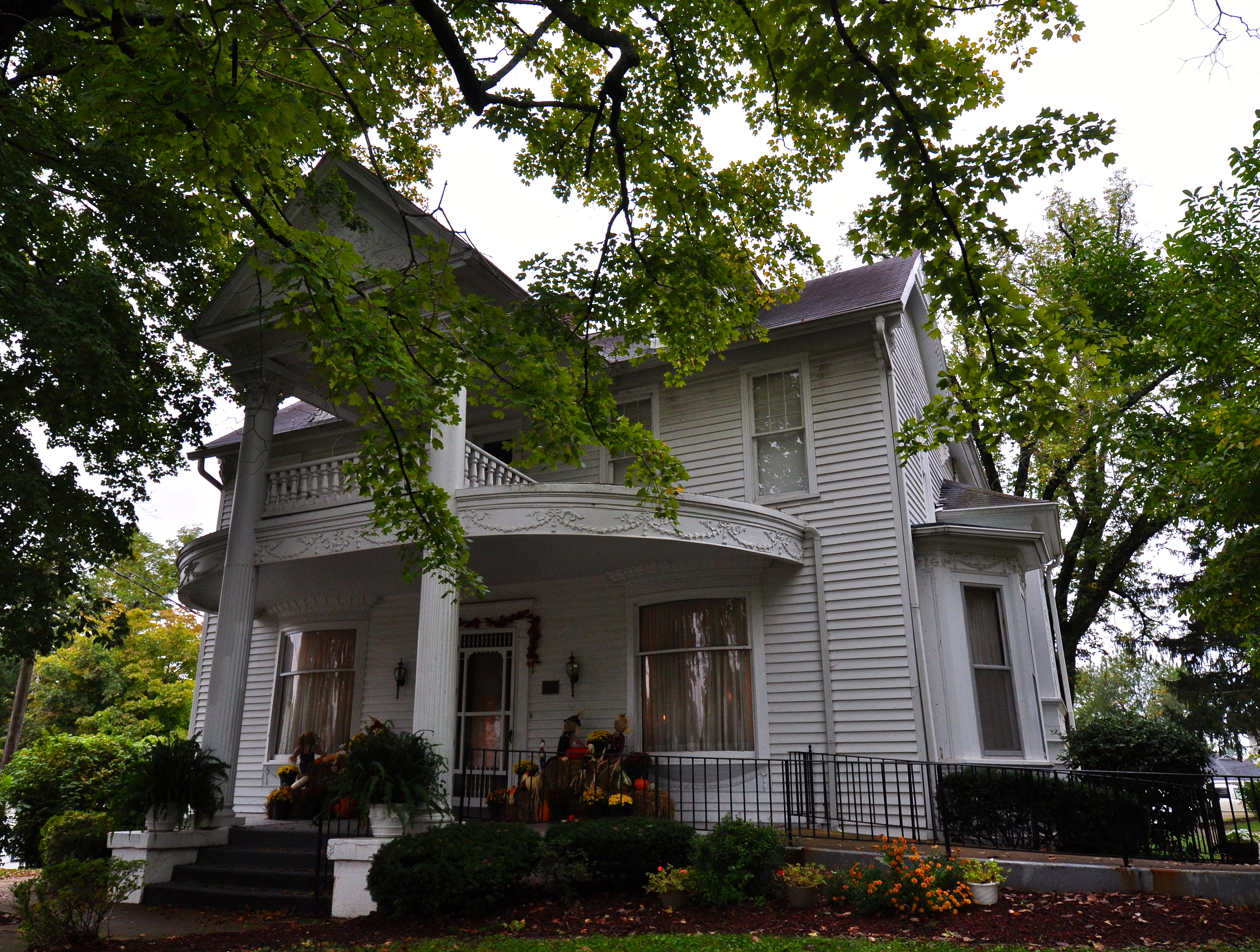
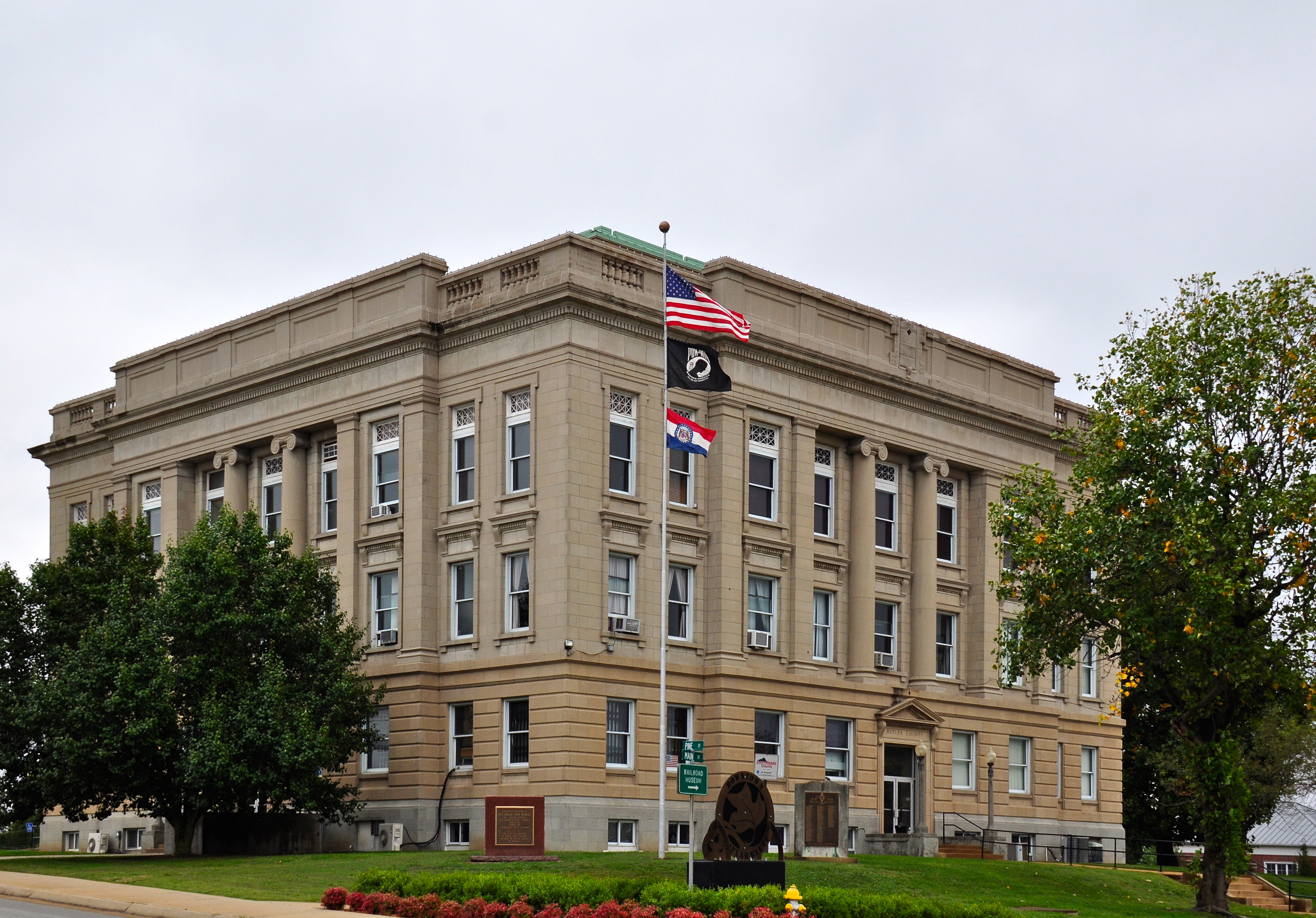
- Rodgers Theatre Poplar Bluff Public Library Poplar Bluff Station Moore-Dalton House Butler County Courthouse
- Nicknames: Gateway to the Ozarks, The Bluff, PB
- Motto: A Community of Opportunity
- Location in Missouri Location in the United States
- Coordinates: 36°45′17″N 90°23′45″W
- Country: United States
- State: Missouri
- County: Butler

Government
  - Type: Council-Manager
  - Mayor: Shane Cornman
  - Mayor Pro tem: Lisa Armes-Parson
  - City Manager: Matt Winters

Area
  - Total: 13.21 sq mi (34.22 km^{2})
  - Land: 13.14 sq mi (34.03 km^{2})
  - Water: 0.073 sq mi (0.19 km^{2})
- Elevation: 348 ft (106 m)

Population (2020)
  - Total: 16,225
  - Density: 1,234.9/sq mi (476.78/km^{2})
- Time zone: UTC−6 (Central (CST))
  - Summer (DST): UTC−5 (CDT)
- ZIP Codes: 63901–63902
- Area code: 573
- FIPS code: 29-59096
- GNIS feature ID: 2396252
- Website: www.poplarbluff-mo.gov

Poplar Bluff is a city in and the county seat of Butler County, Missouri, United States; it is known as the "Gateway to the Ozarks", among other names. Its population was 16,225 at the 2020 census. The Poplar Bluff micropolitan statistical area consists of all of Butler County. The city is at the crossroads of U.S. Routes 60 and 67.

== History ==
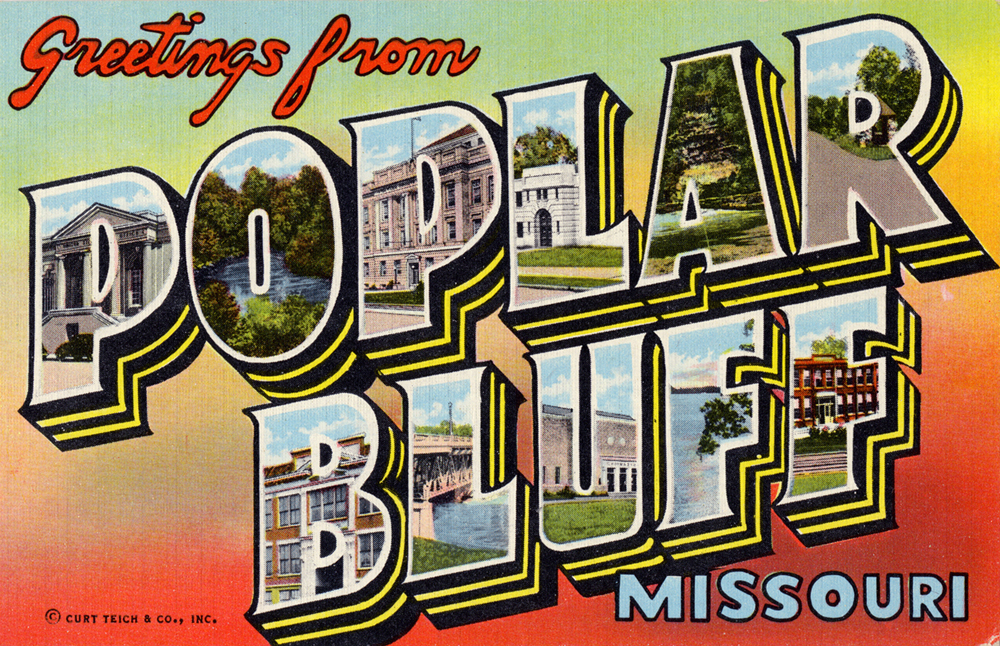
Postcard featuring Poplar Bluff, produced in 1946

The French were the first Europeans to assert any territorial rights over the Poplar Bluff area. They held the area until 1771, when it was ceded by treaty to Spain. Spain held the area until 1802, when it was returned to France. The area that would become Poplar Bluff and Butler County had no permanent European settlement until 1819, when the first white family moved into the area. About 300 Native Americans resided in the area at that time.

The earliest permanent settlements in what is now Butler County occurred in the early 19th century along the Natchitoches Trail, an old Native American trail west of what is now Poplar Bluff on Ten Mile Creek and Cane Creek. Butler County was organized in 1849, and Poplar Bluff was chosen as the county seat. In 1855, the first courthouse was built, and the town grew.

A tornado leveled most of the city, especially the original business district along Main and Broadway streets, on May 9, 1927. The tornado killed 98 people, tying it as the 17th-deadliest tornado in U.S. history. On March 15, 2025, a low-end EF3 tornado hit the western and northwestern part of town, killing one person and damaging many structures.

Several buildings in Poplar Bluff are listed on the National Register of Historic Places, including the Butler County Courthouse, Cynthia-Kinzer Historic District, Alfred W. Greer House, Hargrove Pivot Bridge, Mark Twain School, J. Herbert Moore House, Thomas Moore House, Moore-Dalton House, North Main Street Historic District, John Archibald Phillips House, Poplar Bluff Commercial Historic District, Poplar Bluff Public Library, Rodgers Theatre Building, South Sixth Street Historic District, St. Louis, Iron Mountain and Southern Railroad Depot, St. Louis-San Francisco Railroad Depot, Wheatley Public School, Williams-Gierth House, Williamson-Kennedy School, Wright-Dalton-Bell-Anchor Department Store Building, and Zehe Building.

== Demographics ==
Historical population
Census	Pop.	Note	%±
1880	791		—
1890	2,187		176.5%
1900	4,321		97.6%
1910	6,916		60.1%
1920	8,042		16.3%
1930	7,551		−6.1%
1940	11,163		47.8%
1950	15,064		34.9%
1960	15,926		5.7%
1970	16,653		4.6%
1980	17,139		2.9%
1990	16,996		−0.8%
2000	16,651		−2.0%
2010	17,023		2.2%
2020	16,225		−4.7%

=== 2020 census ===
As of the 2020 census, Poplar Bluff had a population of 16,225, with 6,638 households and 3,665 families. The median age was 37.3 years; 24.1% of the residents were under 18 and 18.1% were 65 or older. The female/male ratio was 1:0.893 overall and 1:0.864 for those 18 and over.

About 96.6% of residents lived in urban areas, while 3.4% lived in rural areas.

Of the households, 30.4% had children under 18 living in them, 30.0% were married-couple households, 21.0% were households with a male householder and no spouse or partner present, and 38.8% were households with a female householder and no spouse or partner present. About 36.2% of all households were made up of individuals, and 16.5% had someone living alone who was 65 or older. The average household size was 2.5, and the average family size was 3.2.

The city had 7,564 housing units, of which 12.2% were vacant. The homeowner vacancy rate was 3.4% and the rental vacancy rate was 10.0%.

Racial composition as of the 2020 census
Race	Number	Percentage
White	12,553	77.4%
Black or African American	1,878	11.6%
American Indian and Alaska Native	84	0.5%
Asian	144	0.9%
Native Hawaiian and other Pacific Islander	10	0.1%
Some other race	193	1.2%
Two or more races	1,364	8.4%
Hispanic or Latino (of any race)	461	2.8%

=== Income and poverty ===
The 2016–2020 5-year American Community Survey estimates show that the median household income was $35,603 (with a margin of error of +/- $5,999) and the median family income was $46,845 (+/- $4,821). Males had a median income of $23,477 (+/- $3,135) versus $19,077 (+/- $4,343) for females. The median income for those above 16 years old was $21,308 (+/- $1,457). About 18.7% of the families and 26.6% of the population were below the poverty line, including 35.2% of those under 18 and 13.2% of those 65 or over.

=== 2010 census ===
As of the 2010 census, 17,023 people, 7,181 households, and 4,154 families resided in the city. The population density was 1,318.6 inhabitants per square mile (509.1/km^{2}). The 8,038 housing units had an average density of 622.6 per square mile (240.4/km^{2}). The racial makeup of the city was 84.79% White, 9.97% Black or African American, 0.53% Native American, 0.89% Asian, 0.06% Native Hawaiian or Pacific Islander], 0.90% from other races, and 2.84% from two or more races. Hispanics or Latinos of any race were 2.21% of the population.

Of the 7,181 households, 30.5% had children under 18 living with them, 35.1% were married couples living together, 17.6% had a female householder with no husband present, 5.2% had a male householder with no wife present, and 42.2% were not families. About 36.1% of all households were made up of individuals, and 15.4% had someone living alone who was 65 or older. The average household size was 2.28, and the average family size was 2.94.

The median age in the city was 38.4 years; the age distribution was 24.2% under 18, 9.6% from 18 to 24, 23.6% from 25 to 44, 24.6% from 45 to 64, and 18.2% were 65 or older. The gender makeup of the city was 45.9% male and 54.1% female.

=== 2000 census ===
According to the 2000 U.S. Census, 16,651 people, 7,077 households, and 4,295 families were residing in the city. The population density was 1,438.9 inhabitants per square mile (555.6/km^{2}). The 7,871 housing units had an average density of 680.2 per square mile (262.6/km^{2}).

The racial makeup of the city was 87.04% White, 9.71% African American, 0.55% Native American, 0.52% Asian, 0.48% from other races, and 1.71% from two or more races. Hispanics or Latinos of any race were 1.35% of the population.

Of the 7,870 households, 52.7% were married couples living together, 20.28% had a female householder with no husband present, 39.3% were not families, 34.9% were made up of individuals, and 17.0% had someone living alone who was 65 or older. The average household size was 2.27, and the average family size was 2.9.

In the city, the age distribution was 24.3% under 18, 8.8% from 18 to 24, 25.5% from 25 to 44, 21.5% from 45 to 64, and 19.9% who were 65 or older. The median age was 38.7 years. For every 100 females, there were 83.6 males. For every 100 females 18 and over, there were 78.5 males.

The median income in the city for a household was $22,068 and for a family was $28,744. The per capita income for the city was $13,996. About 19.3% of families and 24.4% of the population were below the poverty line, including 34.4% of those under 18 and 17.6% of those 65 or over.

== Geography ==
Poplar Bluff is located along the Black River. According to the United States Census Bureau, the city has a total area of 12.98 square miles (33.62 km^{2}), of which 0.07 sq mi (0.18 km^{2}) is covered by water.

Poplar Bluff takes its name from a bluff that overlooks the Black River. When first settled, the bluff was covered with tulip poplar trees in one of their few abundant populations west of the Mississippi River. The Butler County Courthouse and the offices of the city's Daily American Republic newspaper sit on this site. Poplar Bluff lies along an escarpment separating the foothills of the Ozarks from the Mississippi embayment of southeastern Missouri. The foothills lie to the north and west and the embayment is to the south and east. The surrounding area is commonly known as the "Three Rivers", with many local organizations and businesses using the name. The three rivers—Current River, Black River, and St. Francis River—are 40 miles apart with Poplar Bluff located in the center on the Black River.

=== Climate ===
Poplar Bluff has a humid subtropical climate (Cfa). Winters are cool with occasional snowfalls, while summers are hot and humid. Rain is abundant year round, but especially in spring and fall. The coldest month is January with a mean of 34.9 °F (1.6 °C) and the hottest month, July, has a mean of 80.5 °F (26.9 °C). On average, 58 days exceed 90 °F (32 °C) and two exceed 100 °F (38 °C). In the winter, an average of 10.6 days fail to exceed freezing, while 83 days have lows dip below freezing on average. The hottest temperature on record is 112 °F (44 °C), recorded three times in 1901 on July 12, 22, and 23. The lowest temperature ever recorded was −25 °F (−32 °C) on February 13, 1899.

Climate data for Poplar Bluff, Missouri (1991–2020 normals, extremes 1893–present)
Month	Jan	Feb	Mar	Apr	May	Jun	Jul	Aug	Sep	Oct	Nov	Dec	Year
Record high °F (°C)	78 (26)	83 (28)	92 (33)	94 (34)	100 (38)	110 (43)	112 (44)	112 (44)	108 (42)	96 (36)	85 (29)	79 (26)	112 (44)
Mean maximum °F (°C)	64.5 (18.1)	70.1 (21.2)	77.3 (25.2)	84.5 (29.2)	90.6 (32.6)	96.5 (35.8)	99.0 (37.2)	98.6 (37.0)	93.6 (34.2)	86.5 (30.3)	75.4 (24.1)	65.3 (18.5)	101.0 (38.3)
Mean daily maximum °F (°C)	44.0 (6.7)	49.3 (9.6)	59.0 (15.0)	69.9 (21.1)	78.9 (26.1)	87.5 (30.8)	90.5 (32.5)	89.5 (31.9)	82.8 (28.2)	71.9 (22.2)	57.8 (14.3)	47.1 (8.4)	69.0 (20.6)
Daily mean °F (°C)	34.9 (1.6)	39.4 (4.1)	48.5 (9.2)	58.7 (14.8)	68.3 (20.2)	77.3 (25.2)	80.5 (26.9)	79.0 (26.1)	71.7 (22.1)	59.8 (15.4)	47.7 (8.7)	38.2 (3.4)	58.7 (14.8)
Mean daily minimum °F (°C)	25.8 (−3.4)	29.5 (−1.4)	38.1 (3.4)	47.4 (8.6)	57.6 (14.2)	67.0 (19.4)	70.6 (21.4)	68.5 (20.3)	60.6 (15.9)	47.7 (8.7)	37.5 (3.1)	29.3 (−1.5)	48.3 (9.1)
Mean minimum °F (°C)	9.2 (−12.7)	14.1 (−9.9)	22.2 (−5.4)	33.7 (0.9)	43.6 (6.4)	56.4 (13.6)	62.6 (17.0)	60.0 (15.6)	46.6 (8.1)	34.0 (1.1)	23.7 (−4.6)	14.7 (−9.6)	5.7 (−14.6)
Record low °F (°C)	−23 (−31)	−25 (−32)	0 (−18)	23 (−5)	28 (−2)	41 (5)	48 (9)	44 (7)	31 (−1)	17 (−8)	4 (−16)	−10 (−23)	−25 (−32)
Average precipitation inches (mm)	3.46 (88)	3.63 (92)	4.77 (121)	5.94 (151)	5.37 (136)	4.29 (109)	4.70 (119)	3.65 (93)	3.29 (84)	4.07 (103)	4.80 (122)	4.27 (108)	52.24 (1,327)
Average snowfall inches (cm)	0.6 (1.5)	1.6 (4.1)	1.3 (3.3)	0.0 (0.0)	0.0 (0.0)	0.0 (0.0)	0.0 (0.0)	0.0 (0.0)	0.0 (0.0)	0.0 (0.0)	0.2 (0.51)	1.7 (4.3)	5.4 (14)
Average precipitation days (≥ 0.01 in)	8.7	7.5	10.9	10.4	11.4	8.7	8.4	7.6	6.8	7.8	9.2	8.7	106.1
Average snowy days (≥ 0.1 in)	0.5	0.6	0.4	0.0	0.0	0.0	0.0	0.0	0.0	0.0	0.1	0.4	1.8
Source: NOAA

== Government ==
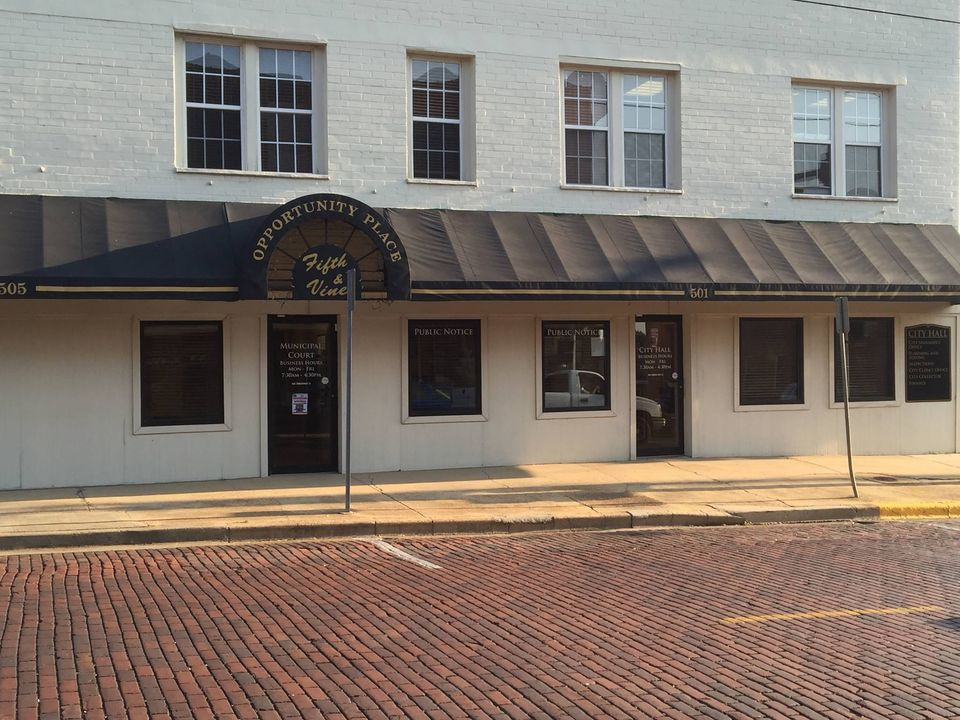
The city hall of Poplar Bluff, Missouri

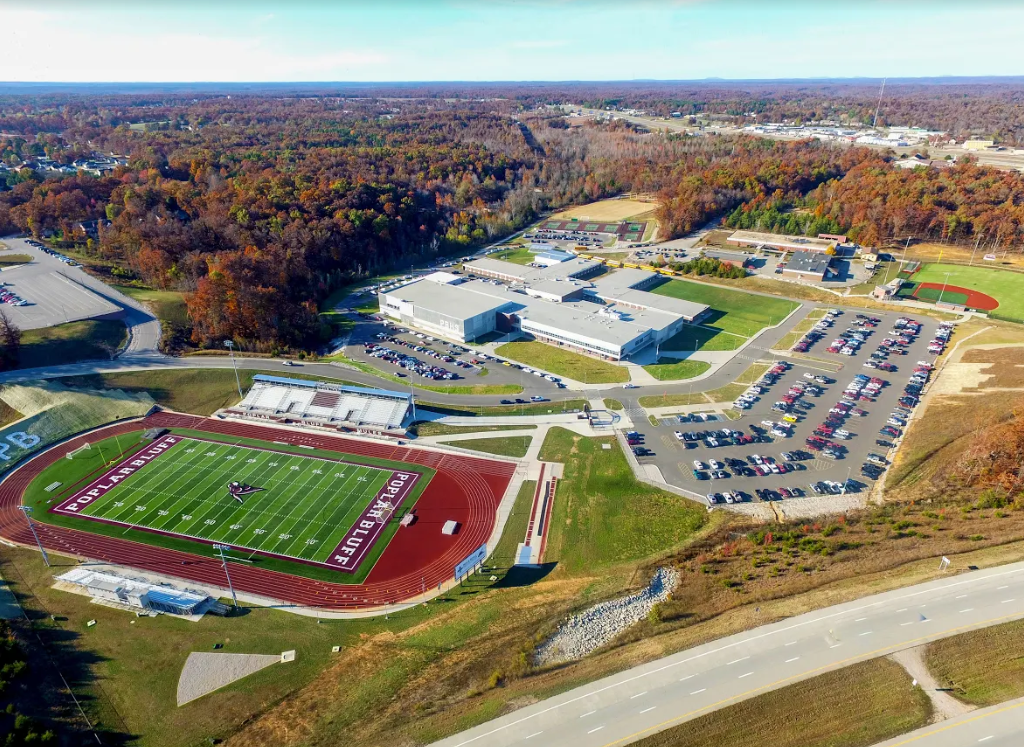
Poplar Bluff High School Stadium

Poplar Bluff operates under a council–manager form of government. The city manager appoints heads of various city departments and agencies, including directors for the airport, art museum, Black River Coliseum, personnel, collections, city planning, and streets, and the chiefs of fire and police.

== Economy ==
The largest U.S. nail manufacturer, Mid-Continent Steel and Wire, is located in Poplar Bluff. It is one of 15 nail companies in the U.S., and accounted for half of U.S. nail production as of June 2018. At its peak, the Mexican-owned firm employed about 500 workers in the area, but as of 2018, uncertainty over steel tariffs threatened the plant's future. On April 3, 2019, Mid-Continent Steel and Wire received a steel tariff exemption, allowing it to maintain its workforce and increase production.

== Education ==
=== Public schools ===
The Poplar Bluff R-1 School District serves the educational needs of most of the residents of Poplar Bluff and the surrounding area. Seven elementary schools, one junior high, and one senior high school are in the school district. During the 2022–2023 school year, 5,204 students and 609 total staff members were enrolled in the district. The school's colors are maroon and white and its mascot is the mule. Athletics offered in the school district include basketball, soccer, track, cross-country running, tennis, golf, band, wrestling, and swimming for boys and girls; boys' baseball and football; and girls' softball, volleyball, cheerleading, and pom squad.

Elementary schools

- Poplar Bluff Early Childhood Center
- Poplar Bluff Kindergarten Center
- O'Neal Elementary
- Oak Grove Elementary
- Lake Road Elementary
- Eugene Field Elementary
- Poplar Bluff Middle School

Secondary schools

- Poplar Bluff Junior High School- 7th and 8th grades
- Poplar Bluff High School- 9th through 12th grades
- Poplar Bluff Technical Career Center

=== Private schools ===
- Sacred Heart Catholic School
- Thomas M. Lane Seventh-day Adventist Church School
- Westwood Baptist Academy

=== Colleges and universities ===
Three Rivers College is a community college located in Poplar Bluff. It provides college courses along with career and technical programs. Three Rivers offers freshman- and sophomore-level classes similar to many four-year public universities. The school's colors are gold and black and its mascot is Rocky Raider. Three Rivers basketball coach Gene Bess has been recognized as the National Junior College Athletic Association (NJCAA) "all-time most winning junior college coach".

=== News and media ===
The Daily American Republic newspaper is the local news of record for Poplar Bluff; it has a daily print edition and a website. Poplar Bluff is located in the Cape Girardeau–Paducah–Harrisburg–Carbondale media market and is served by the television stations covering that market, which include:

- WPSD-TV 6 (NBC) Paducah
- KFVS-TV 12 (CBS) Cape Girardeau
  - KFVS-TV 12.2 (The CW) Cape Girardeau
- KPOB-TV 15 (ABC) Poplar Bluff (satellite of WSIL-TV 3, Harrisburg)
- KBSI 23 (Fox) Cape Girardeau
- WDKA 49 (MNTV) Paducah

=== Library ===
Poplar Bluff has a lending library, the Poplar Bluff Public Library.

== Transportation ==
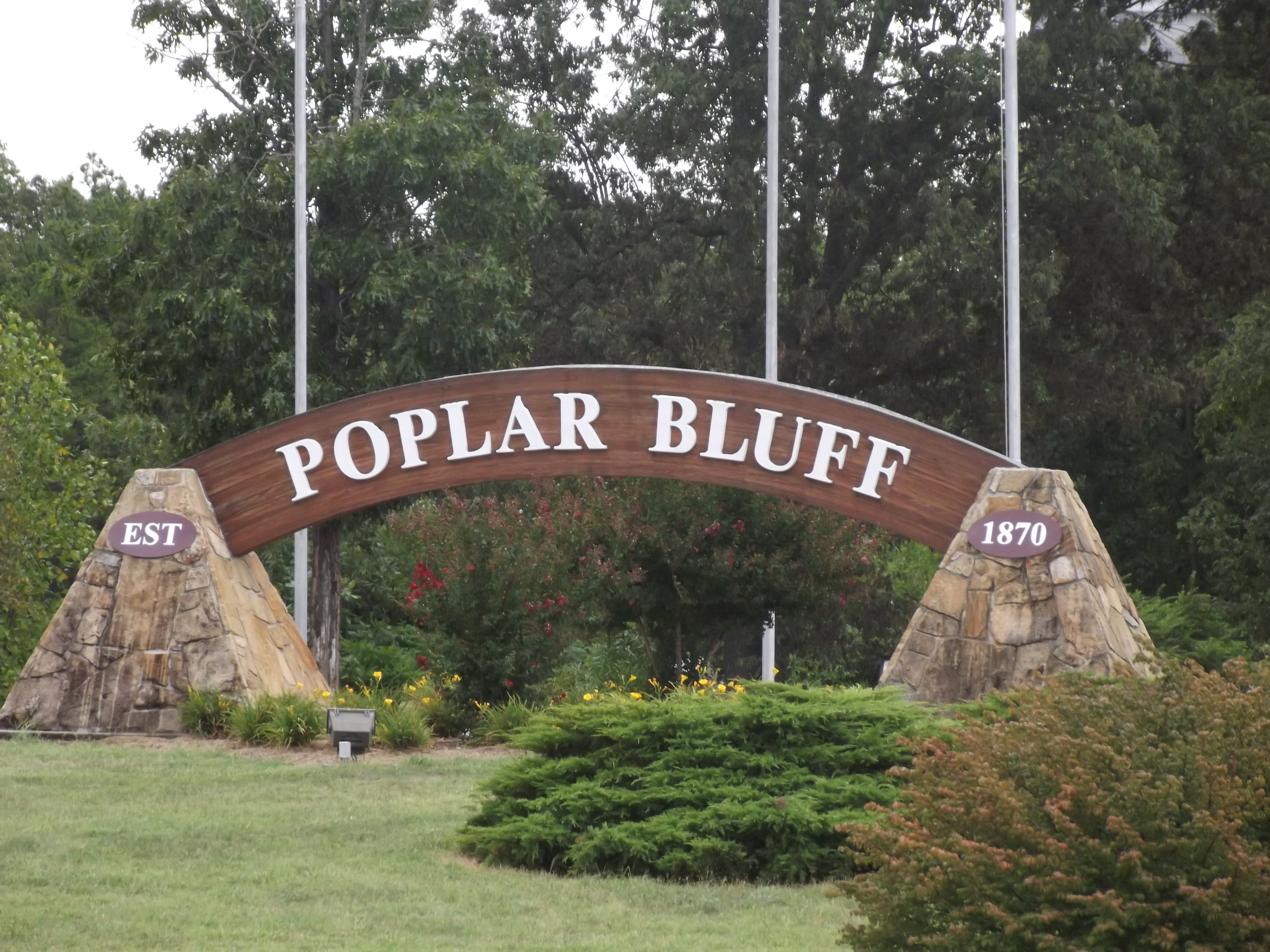
Gateway arch

Amtrak provides passenger train service from the Poplar Bluff station.

Bluff Area Transit Service provides Poplar Bluff residents with deviated fixed-route public transit service. The service operates four routes from 8 am to 4 pm Monday through Friday.

The city is at the crossroads of U.S. Routes 60 and 67.

== Notable people ==
- Linda Bloodworth-Thomason, television producer (Designing Women)
- Christian Boeving, fitness model, bodybuilder, and actor
- Sean Fister, 1995, 2001, and 2005 world long-drive champion, inducted to three Halls of Fame
- Leroy Griffith, burlesque theater owner and film producer
- Tyler Hansbrough, NBA basketball player for the Toronto Raptors, Indiana Pacers, and Charlotte Hornets
- Scott Innes, radio broadcaster and voice actor for Scooby-Doo
- Charles Jaco, CNN reporter
- Billie G. Kanell, Medal of Honor recipient, United States Army
- Archie League, first air traffic controller in the U.S. and past FAA Air Traffic Service director
- Tim Lollar, professional baseball pitcher
- Matt Lucas, singer, drummer, and songwriter
- Julie McCullough, actress, model (Growing Pains and Playboy Playmate)
- Kameron Misner, professional baseball player for the Tampa Bay Rays
- Derland Moore, professional football player
- William Wilson Morgan, Yerkes Observatory astronomer who discovered the shape and spiral-arm structure of the Milky Way galaxy
- Mikel Rouse, composer

== See also ==
- List of cities in Missouri
