= List of University of North Alabama people =

This is a list of notable alumni of the University of North Alabama or its predecessors such as LaGrange College, Florence Wesleyan University and Florence State University:

== Academia ==
- Donald B. Dodd, emeritus professor of history at Auburn University Montgomery and a noted authority on Southern Unionism in northwest Alabama, particularly the Republic of Winston
- Thomas L. Maddin (1826–1908), Confederate physician, professor of medicine at the Vanderbilt University School of Medicine
- Danny B. Moore, professor, provost and vice president of Academic Affairs, Chowan University
- David Weir, professor emeritus at Cooper Union, expert on Decadent Movement in literature and its impact on America

== Arts and entertainment ==
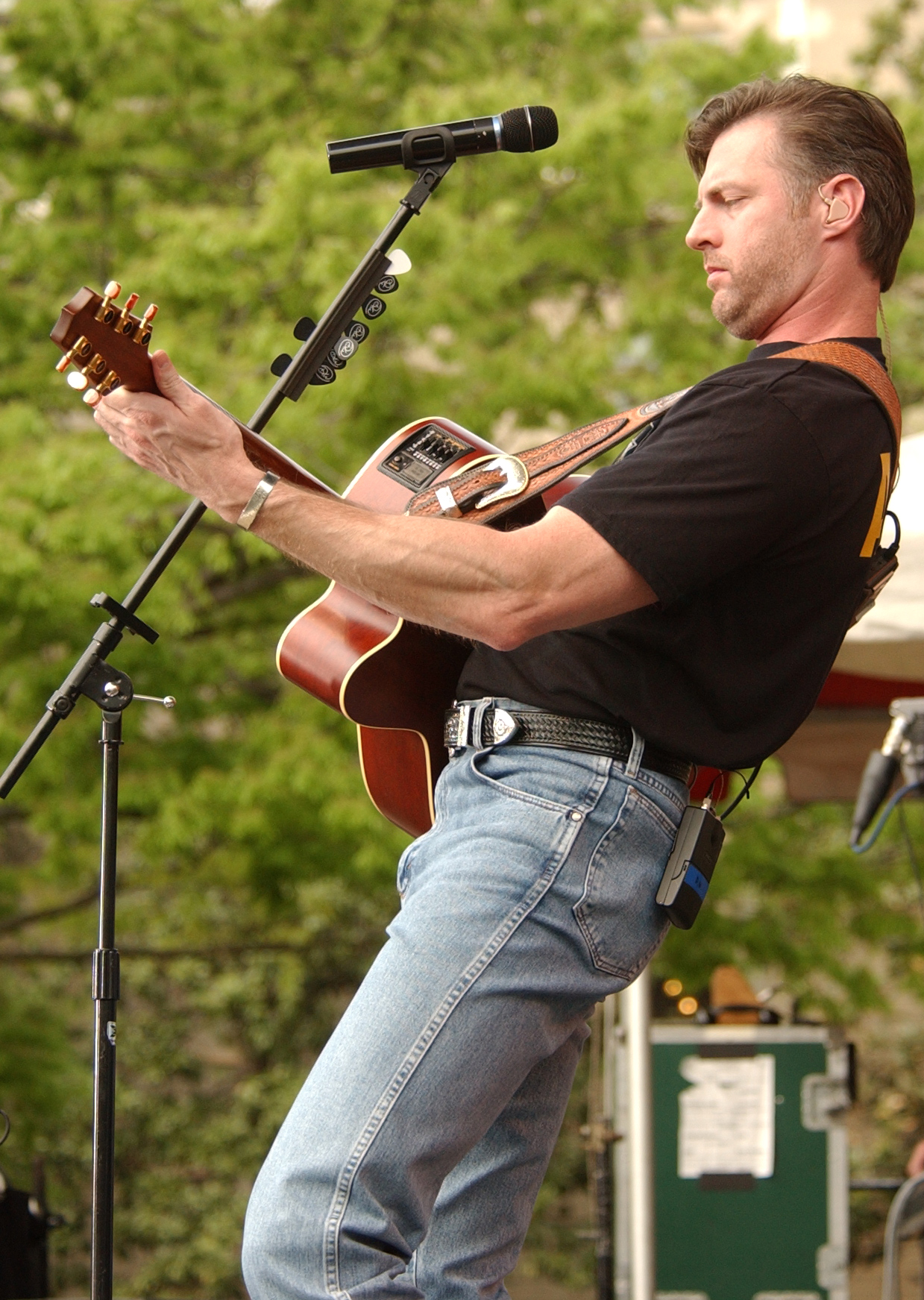
Country music singer and composer Darryl Worley, who holds a degree in organic chemistry from UNA

- Walt Aldridge, composer of “There’s No Getting Over Me” and “Holding Her and Loving You”
- Clay Bennett, Pulitzer Prize-winning editorial cartoonist
- David Hood, world-renowned bassist, member of Alabama Music Hall of Fame
- Patterson Hood, composer and front man, Drive-by Truckers
- Michael Conner Humphreys, actor who portrayed the young Forrest Gump in the film Forrest Gump
- Priyanka Karki, Nepalese actress, former Miss Teen Nepal, VJ, singer, choreographer, model, and dancer
- George "Goober" Lindsey, actor and narrator, founder of George Lindsey Film Festival
- Pam Long, Miss Alabama 1974, scriptwriter of television's Guiding Light
- Michael 'Nick' Nichols ’78, photographer and editor-at-large, National Geographic
- Rob Rausch, snake wrangler and television personality; known for Love Island and The Traitors
- Jordy Searcy, singer-songwriter
- Glenn Shadix, actor of stage and screen
- Thomas Sigismund Stribling, Pulitzer Prize-winning writer
- Mark Thompson, radio personality, Mark & Brian Morning Show
- Steve Trash, magician, environmental advocate, children's entertainer
- John Paul White, Grammy Award-winning singer-songwriter, The Civil Wars
- Darryl Worley, country music singer-songwriter
- Tom York, host of Tom York Morning Show, Emmy Award winner

== Business ==
- Jim Blasingame, founder of Small Business Network, author, syndicated radio show host
- Wendell Wilkie Gunn, first Black student admitted to Florence State Teachers College
- Richard "Dick" Ordway, Deputy Project Manager for the Apache Attack Helicopter Project Management Office, U.S. Army Aviation and Missile Command, Huntsville AL. Major, U.S. Army, Airborne Ranger, Huey Helicopter Pilot, two tours in Vietnam, Awarded the Bronz Star Medal with "V" device for Valor (Valor—repeated acts of bravery despite great personal risk) w/three oak leaf Clusters, The Air Medal with "V" device. Commanded UNA ROTC Brigade, 1965.
- Stephen R. Stovall, Founder and CEO of Stovall-Marks Insurance; Deacon, Central Park Baptist Church, fifty+ years.

== Law, government and politics ==
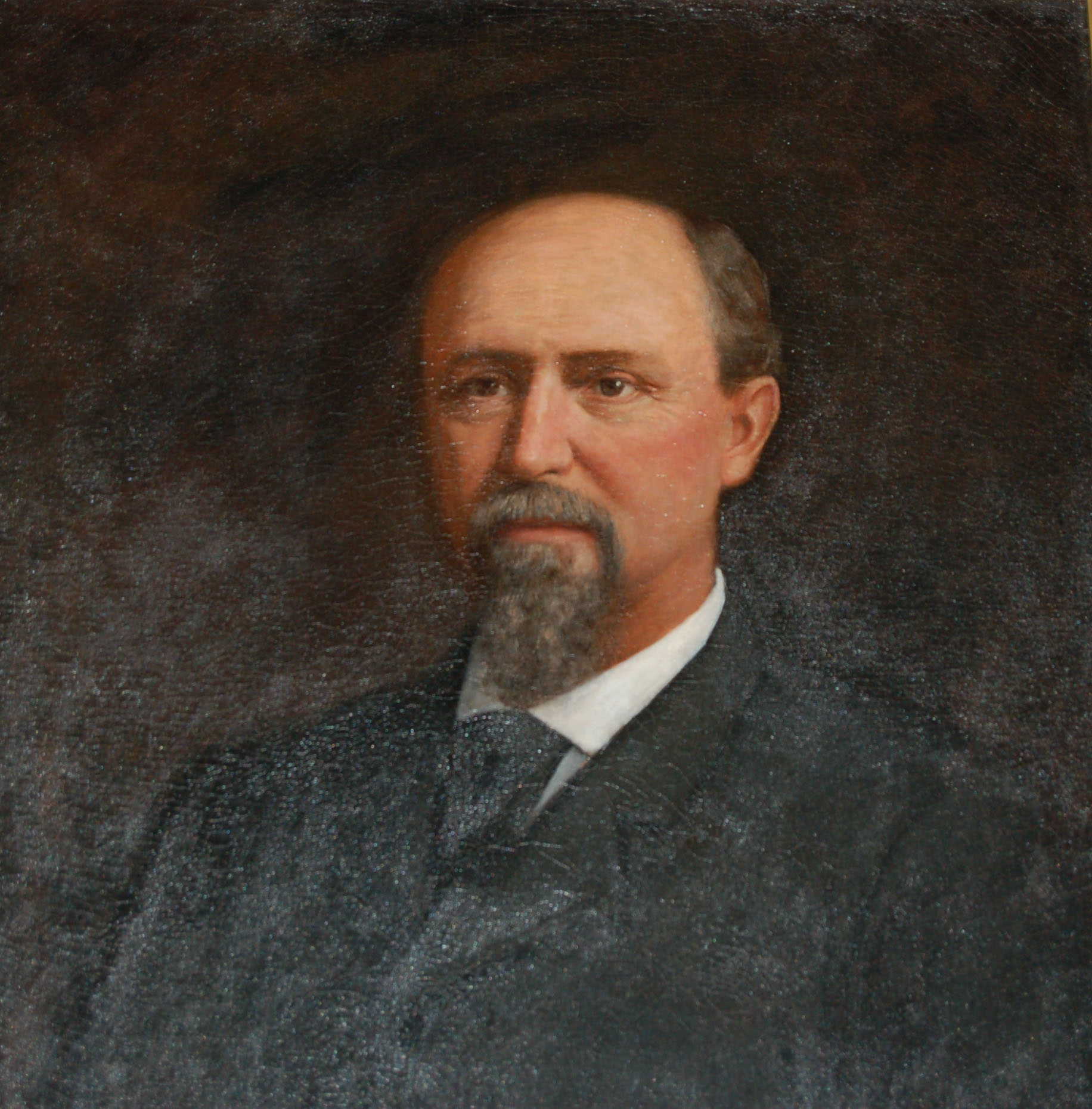
Lawrence Sullivan Ross, Confederate States Army general and Texas governor, 1887–91; graduate of Florence Wesleyan University, now the University of North Alabama

- Robert Aderholt, U.S. representative for Alabama's 4th Congressional District
- Richard F. Allen, Chief Deputy Attorney General, State of Alabama (1995–2005, 2011) (Attorneys General Sessions, Pryor, King, and Strange), Acting Attorney General (April–March 2004), Commissioner, Alabama Department of Corrections (2006–2011) (Governor Bob Riley), Parliamentary Law Advisor, Lieutenant Governor Kay Ivey (2013–2017), Chief Legislative Assistant, U.S. Senator Howell Heflin 1978–81.
- Miles C. Allgood (graduated 1898), United States representative from Alabama (1923–1935)
- Edward B. Almon, United States representative from Alabama (1915–1933)
- Sonceria Ann Berry, United States Senate, Secretary of the Senate (2021–2025)
- Greg Burdine, attorney and former legislative member, Alabama House of Representatives, representing 1st District
- Billy Joe Camp, Alabama Secretary of State, Public Service Commissioner and gubernatorial press secretary
- Mike Curtis, former legislative member, Alabama House of Representatives, representing 2nd District
- Ronnie Flippo, former member of the United States Congress
- Paul Hubbert, executive director, Alabama Education Association; 1990 Democratic gubernatorial nominee
- Tammy Irons, attorney and former legislative member, Alabama Senate, representing 1st District
- Christopher D. Jackson, political strategist, local government official, and UNA Public Service Alumni Award winner
- Hiram Raleigh Kennedy, physician and member of the Alabama Senate representing the 1st District
- Jamie Kiel, legislative member, Alabama House of Representatives, representing District 18
- Mike Kirkland, member of the Alabama House of Representatives
- Edward A. O'Neal, Confederate general and Alabama governor, 1882–1886
- Emmet O'Neal, Alabama governor, 1911–1915
- Lawrence Sullivan Ross, Confederate General, Governor of Texas, president of Texas A&M University
- Andrew Sorrell, legislative member, Alabama House of Representatives, representing 3rd District
- Annette Taddeo, Florida state senator representing District 40
- Kerry Underwood, member of the Alabama House of Representatives

== Military ==
- James Edward Moore (James E. Moore), Major General, The Adjutant General, Alabama Army National Guard
- Richard F. Allen, Brigadier General, U.S. Army Reserve. Legion of Merit, Bronze Star Medal, U.S. Army Ordnance Corps Hall of Fame, UNA Alumnus of the year(1991), U.S. Army War College Outstanding Graduate (2018)
- Columbus Womble, Brigadier General, U.S. Army. Airborne Ranger. Defense Superior Service Medal, Legion of Merit(two oak leaf clusters). Bronze Star(two oak leaf clusters)
- James Noles , Brigadier General, U.S. Army. Airborne Ranger. Riverine with 9th Infantry Division. Twice awarded the Silver Star Medal for gallantry in combat in Vietnam. Distinguished Service Medal, Legion of Merit, Combat Infantry Badge.
- Troy Oliver , Brigadier General, U.S. Army, Alabama Army National Guard. Airborne. Bronze Star medal with "V" device for valor, Purple Heart Medal, Meritorious Service Medal.
- Fred W. Shaver Jr., Brigadier General, Georgia Army National Guard. Commanded the 118th Field Artillery Brigade, Georgia Army National Guard. Meritorious Service Medal, Army Commendation Medal. General Shaver, or Coach Shaver, as he preferred, was a coach, teacher, and school administrator for 35 years. He was named the Class "B" Football coach of the year for three consecutive years from 1971 to 1973 having led Bulloch County High School football team to the South Georgia Championship in 1971 and to State Championships in 1972 and 1973. In 1992, the school's football field was designated the "Fred Shaver Field' in his honor.

== Religion ==
- Kip Box, administrative bishop, Michigan, Church of God (Cleveland, Tennessee)
- Robert Hitchcock Spain, bishop, United Methodist Church

== Athletics ==
- Tyrone Bell, former Green Bay Packers defensive back
- Bobby Collins, former NFL player
- Tony Dorsey, pro basketball player with the Newcastle Eagles
- Will Hall, former head coach at University of West Alabama and University of West Georgia, former offensive coordinator at University of Louisiana at Lafayette, current head coach at University of Southern Mississippi
- Corey Harris, NFL player
- Harlon Hill, former NFL player, namesake of the NCAA Division II Harlon Hill Trophy
- Janoris Jenkins, cornerback, New York Giants
- Marcus Keyes, football player
- Ronald McKinnon, NFL player, Harlon Hill trophy winner and recent inductee into the College Football Hall of Fame
- Evan Oglesby, cornerback, Dallas Cowboys
- Preston Parker, wide receiver, Tampa Bay Buccaneers
- Israel Raybon, football player
- Wimp Sanderson, former University of Alabama head basketball coach
- Brian Satterfield, former Green Bay Packers running back
- Robert Steele, former NFL wide receiver
- Josh Willingham, former MLB outfielder
