= Daniel Moore =

Daniel Moore or Dan Moore may refer to:

== Military ==
- Daniel B. Moore (1838–1914), American Civil War soldier and Medal of Honor recipient
- Dan Tyler Moore (1877–1941), U.S. Army officer and aide to President Theodore Roosevelt

== Music ==
- Daniel Moore (musician) (born 1941), American singer/songwriter
- Daniel Martin Moore, American singer and songwriter

== Politics ==
- Daniel Moore (Great Marlow MP), British member of parliament for Great Marlow
- Daniel Moore (Ilchester MP), British member of parliament for Ilchester
- Daniel A. Moore Jr. (1933–1922), justice of the Supreme Court of Alaska
- Daniel Charles Moore (1801–1890), merchant and politician in Nova Scotia, Canada
- Daniel Foulke Moore (1841–1919), American politician from Pennsylvania
- Dan K. Moore (1906–1986), North Carolina governor
- Danny Roy Moore (1925–c. 2020), member of the Louisiana State Senate

== Sports ==
- Danny Moore (born 1971), Australian rugby player
- Daniel Moore (footballer) (born 1988), Scottish footballer
- Daniel Moore (soccer) (born 2002), American soccer player
- Dan Moore (American football) (born 1998), American football player
- Dan Moore (long jumper) (born 1940), American long jumper, two-time All-American for the Stanford Cardinal track and field team

== Other people ==
- Daniel Moore (inventor), 1860s handgun manufacturer, before selling to National Arms Company
- Daniel Moore (poet) (1940–2016), American poet, essayist, and librettist
- Dan Tyler Moore (author) (1908–1998), American author
- Daniel McFarlan Moore (1869–1936), American inventor
- Danny B. Moore, American academic at Chowan University

== Fictional characters ==
- Danny Moore (The Inbetweeners), a character in the British sitcom The Inbetweeners
