= List of United States tornadoes from March to April 2013 =

This is a list of all tornadoes that were confirmed by local offices of the National Weather Service in the United States from March to April 2013.

== United States yearly total ==
Confirmed tornadoes by Enhanced Fujita rating
EFU	EF0	EF1	EF2	EF3	EF4	EF5	Total
0	499	309	80	19	8	1	916

== March ==
Confirmed tornadoes by Enhanced Fujita rating
EFU	EF0	EF1	EF2	EF3	EF4	EF5	Total
0	9	7	3	0	0	0	19

=== March 5 event ===
List of confirmed tornadoes – Tuesday, March 5, 2013 (Note: All dates are based on the local time zone where the tornado touched down; however, all times are in Coordinated Universal Time for consistency.)
EF#	Location	County / Parish	State	Start Coord.	Time (UTC)	Path length	Max width	Summary
EF1	N of Gibson	Glascock	GA	33.2693°N 82.6114°W	0002 – 0004	1.54 mi (2.48 km)	150 yd (140 m)	Part of the roof was blown off of a house, a camper was blown 50 feet (15 m), and two mobile homes were knocked off their foundations. Four brick walls collapsed at a church's fellowship hall and most of the roof was ripped off of the church itself. Numerous tombstones and other structures at a nearby cemetery were damaged and several trees were downed.

=== March 18 event ===
List of confirmed tornadoes – Monday, March 18, 2013
EF#	Location	County / Parish	State	Start Coord.	Time (UTC)	Path length	Max width	Summary
EF1	NNW of McEwen to Vanleer	Humphreys, Houston, Dickson	TN	36.1859°N 87.6281°W	1240 – 1251	10.6 mi (17.1 km)	150 yd (140 m)	A high-end EF1 tornado touched down in Humpherys County, damaging outbuildings, destroying a greenhouse, wrapping sheet metal around trees, and downing several trees. In Houston County, dozens of trees were downed before the tornado continued into Dickson County. There, two barns were destroyed, with many others suffering mainly roof damage. One home lost its entire roof (however the roof was poorly attached to the home), causing the collapse of the northern exterior wall. Debris from the home was blown over 100 yd (91 m) to the northeast. A poorly constructed single-wide mobile home was blown 50 yd (46 m) to the northeast where it impacted a tree line and was completely destroyed. Trees were downed in Vanleer before the tornado lifted. Hundreds of other trees were downed elsewhere along the path.
EF0	NE of Culleoka	Maury	TN	35.4953°N 86.9464°W	1622 – 1627	3.7 mi (6.0 km)	50 yd (46 m)	A mobile home suffered minor siding damage and an old barn lost part of its roof. Many trees were downed as well. The tornado lifted just before going into Marshall County. This tornado was spawned by the same severe thunderstorm as the Unionville and Christiana tornadoes.
EF0	SW of Unionville	Bedford	TN	35.5844°N 86.6593°W	1647 – 1653	3.89 mi (6.26 km)	50 yd (46 m)	One barn was damaged, another barn lost its roof, and an outbuilding was blown over. Many trees were downed as well. This tornado was spawned by the same severe thunderstorm as the Culleoka and Christiana tornadoes.
EF0	E of Christiana	Rutherford	TN	35.7059°N 86.3512°W	1712 – 1718	3.8 mi (6.1 km)	100 yd (91 m)	This weak tornado crossed I-24 during its lifespan. Sheds and outbuildings suffered minor damage and about 100 trees were downed. This tornado was spawned by the same severe thunderstorm as the Culleoka and Unionville tornadoes.
EF0	NW of Leighton	Colbert	AL	34.7293°N 87.4954°W	1910 – 1913	1.6 mi (2.6 km)	100 yd (91 m)	One residence sustained minor roof and structural damage, a carport was lifted and destroyed, and the undercarriage of a single-wide mobile home was ripped out and thrown into a tree. Many trees were downed as well.
EF2	Kilpatrick	Marshall, DeKalb	AL	34.2687°N 86.1326°W	2041 – 2047	4.21 mi (6.78 km)	220 yd (200 m)	Tornado touched down just inside Marshall County, east of Albertville, where many trees and power poles were downed. Several farm buildings were destroyed in this area as well, with debris being strewn over 100 yd (91 m). The tornado crossed into DeKalb County where it downed many more trees and power poles. Several mobile homes sustained significant damage, with at least two being completely destroyed. Several conventional (site-built) houses suffered minor to moderate exterior damage in this area. The tornado continued through Kilpatrick, causing substantial damage to a large livestock building. A convenience store suffered minor roof damage, a car wash sustained significant structural damage, a tractor-trailer was flipped on its side, and a mobile home was flipped and destroyed before the tornado lifted. Seven people were injured.
EF1	E of Boaz	Marshall, Etowah	AL	34.2048°N 86.1525°W	2041 – 2048	7.95 mi (12.79 km)	300 yd (270 m)	The tornado touched down in Marshall County and caused structural damage to businesses. It also downed numerous trees before leaving the county. In Etowah County, just northeast of Sardis City, a tractor-trailer, a camper, and two mobile homes were overturned. Several barns and small outbuildings suffered minor roof damage. Another mobile home was overturned, leaving one person seriously injured and two others with minor injuries. Two additional mobile homes were completely destroyed, and a brick house had one-third of its roof removed. Many trees were downed along the path. Three people were injured in all.
EF2	WSW of Rainsville	DeKalb	AL	34.4630°N 85.9917°W	2043 – 2051	5.95 mi (9.58 km)	350 yd (320 m)	This tornado traveled across areas north of Fyffe. Several chicken houses were either damaged or destroyed, a restaurant suffered roof damage, a carport was flattened, and a large farm building sustained major damage. Two other large, well constructed farm buildings were destroyed, one of which contained metal trusses that were ripped out of the ground. Debris from the buildings was strewn several hundred yards. A nearby home sustained minor structural damage. Many trees were downed as well.
EF2	NNE of Greenville to W of Concord	Meriwether, Pike	GA	33.1437°N 84.6765°W	2210 – 2230	13.34 mi (21.47 km)	300 yd (270 m)	Two outbuildings and one barn were destroyed, and another barn was shifted off of its foundation. A pontoon boat was thrown into a third barn. One house suffered minor roof damage, with doors and windows blown out as well. Another house suffered minor roof damage, with a third sustaining minor damage to its attached garage. Thousands of trees were downed, a few of which fell on houses.
EF1	SW of Waynesboro	Burke	GA	32.9617°N 82.1649°W	0101 – 0109	5.85 mi (9.41 km)	220 yd (200 m)	Field irrigation systems were severely damaged, several barns were destroyed, and numerous trees were downed.

=== March 19 event ===
List of confirmed tornadoes – Tuesday, March 19, 2013
EF#	Location	County / Parish	State	Start Coord.	Time (UTC)	Path length	Max width	Summary
EF0	S of Shelton	Buffalo	NE	40.7366°N 98.73°W	2200 – 2203	0.58 mi (0.93 km)	10 yd (9.1 m)	A brief, weak landspout tornado caused no damage.

=== March 21 event ===
List of confirmed tornadoes – Thursday, March 21, 2013
EF#	Location	County / Parish	State	Start Coord.	Time (UTC)	Path length	Max width	Summary
EF0	NE of Hockinson	Clark	WA	45.75°N 122.45°W	2300	0.01 mi (0.016 km)	10 yd (9.1 m)	The roof was partially torn off of a barn with debris from the barn being blown into nearby trees and fences and scattered in fields.

=== March 24 event ===
List of confirmed tornadoes – Sunday, March 24, 2013
EF#	Location	County / Parish	State	Start Coord.	Time (UTC)	Path length	Max width	Summary
EF1	S of Somerset	Pulaski	KY	37.0651°N 84.5999°W	2140 – 2141	0.36 mi (0.58 km)	80 yd (73 m)	A brief tornado destroyed a warehouse building, damaged the roofs of several homes, and downed multiple trees.
EF1	SSW of New Tazewell	Claiborne	TN	36.4292°N 83.5999°W	2304 – 2305	1.45 mi (2.33 km)	35 yd (32 m)	A school bus had several windows blown out and many trees were downed, several of which caused minor siding damage to homes and downed power lines.

=== March 29 event ===
List of confirmed tornadoes – Friday, March 29, 2013
EF#	Location	County / Parish	State	Start Coord.	Time (UTC)	Path length	Max width	Summary
EF0	SW of Sutherland	Lincoln	NE	41.1103°N 101.196°W	2302 – 2304	0.32 mi (0.51 km)	25 yd (23 m)	A brief, weak tornado moved over a crop field, causing no damage.
EF0	S of Sutherland	Lincoln	NE	41.1281°N 101.1291°W	2306 – 2308	0.11 mi (0.18 km)	20 yd (18 m)	A brief, weak tornado moved over a crop field, causing no damage.

=== March 30 event ===
List of confirmed tornadoes – Saturday, March 30, 2013
EF#	Location	County / Parish	State	Start Coord.	Time (UTC)	Path length	Max width	Summary
EF0	ESE of Wybark	Muskogee, Wagoner	OK	35.8076°N 95.3016°W	0235 – 0237	1.1 mi (1.8 km)	200 yd (180 m)	A center-pivot irrigation system, several barns, and the roof of a home were all damaged. Trees and power lines were downed as well.
EF1	SSW of Sallisaw	Sequoyah	OK	35.427°N 94.810°W	0420 – 0421	0.5 mi (0.80 km)	175 yd (160 m)	Several barns and outbuildings were destroyed, the roof and windows of a home were severely damaged, and numerous trees and power poles were downed.

== April ==
Confirmed tornadoes by Enhanced Fujita rating
EFU	EF0	EF1	EF2	EF3	EF4	EF5	Total
0	45	32	7	1	0	0	85

=== April 1 event ===
List of confirmed tornadoes – Monday, April 1, 2013
EF#	Location	County	State	Start Coord.	Time (UTC)	Path length	Max width	Summary
EF1	ESE of Silverton	Briscoe	TX	34.4319°N 101.2249°W	2140 – 2145	1.84 mi (2.96 km)	100 yd (91 m)	A high-end EF1 tornado damaged a central pivot irrigation system and snapped several wooden power poles. Rear flank downdraft winds associated with the tornado tore the roof off of a barn as well.

=== April 4 event ===
List of confirmed tornadoes – Thursday, April 4, 2013
EF#	Location	County	State	Start Coord.	Time (UTC)	Path length	Max width	Summary
EF0	SE of Red Bluff	Tehama	CA	40.1541°N 122.219°W	0159 – 0201	0.82 mi (1.32 km)	50 yd (46 m)	A brief rope tornado touched down over open fields and caused no damage.

=== April 5 event ===
List of confirmed tornadoes – Friday, April 5, 2013
EF#	Location	County	State	Start Coord.	Time (UTC)	Path length	Max width	Summary
EF0	Southeastern Big Pine Key	Monroe	FL	24.6352°N 81.3474°W	0610 – 0615	1.56 mi (2.51 km)	80 yd (73 m)	A waterspout moved ashore in southeastern Big Pine Key and picked up a ground deck and four kayaks, throwing them at least 30 yards (27 m). The tornado was at its strongest point at this point. A large cistern containing nearly 200 US gallons (760 L) of water was moved just over 15 yards (14 m), knocking a large camping trailer off of its front mount. Bolts securing a large grill to ground decking were snapped, while numerous tables and lounge chairs were carried across the area. One of the chairs caused gutter damage to a house. Small gravel and peak rock along the waterfront caused moderate to severe paint chipping on the ocean side of several homes. Screens (including their wood frames) were torn off of several homes, with one home losing siding on the ocean side. As the tornado moved east-northeast, more lawn furniture was tossed and wooden signs were downed. It then overturned several tents at a campground before dissipating, as the tornado had become steadily weaker since it came ashore. Many trees and power lines were downed along the path.

=== April 7 event ===
List of confirmed tornadoes – Sunday, April 7, 2013
EF#	Location	County	State	Start Coord.	Time (UTC)	Path length	Max width	Summary
EF0	WSW of Paradise	Russell	KS	39.0867°N 99.0014°W	2338 – 2340	0.48 mi (0.77 km)	50 yd (46 m)	A brief rope tornado downed a few trees.

=== April 8 event ===
List of confirmed tornadoes – Monday, April 8, 2013
EF#	Location	County / Parish	State	Start Coord.	Time (UTC)	Path length	Max width	Summary
EF0	N of Peconic	Kit Carson	CO	39.57°N 102.10°W	0017 – 0018	0.1 mi (0.16 km)	10 yd (9.1 m)	A brief landspout tornado caused no damage.
EF0	W of Xenia	Washington	CO	40.16°N 103.40°W	0124	0.1 mi (0.16 km)	50 yd (46 m)	A brief landspout tornado caused no damage.
EF0	WNW of Elba	Washington	CO	39.96°N 103.32°W	0142 – 0152	0.2 mi (0.32 km)	50 yd (46 m)	A brief tornado caused no damage.
EF0	WNW of Xenia	Washington	CO	40.16°N 103.36°W	0251	0.1 mi (0.16 km)	50 yd (46 m)	A brief tornado caused no damage.
EF1	ENE of Benkelman	Dundy	NE	40.0656°N 101.4581°W	0306 – 0308	0.75 mi (1.21 km)	75 yd (69 m)	Several outbuildings were either damaged or destroyed, utility poles and fences were broken, trees were downed, a trailer was overturned and rolled, and vehicles and farm implements were moved. Two cows suffered serious injuries and had to be euthanized; other cows suffered minor injuries.

=== April 10 event ===
List of confirmed tornadoes – Wednesday, April 10, 2013
EF#	Location	County / Parish	State	Start Coord.	Time (UTC)	Path length	Max width	Summary
EF2	SE of Scotland to Plant	Van Buren	AR	35.489°N 92.574°W	2120 – 2152	17.26 mi (27.78 km)	800 yd (730 m)	Six houses were destroyed, 14 had major damage, and 29 suffered minor damage. 20 more houses suffered very minor damage mostly to roofs. Several dozen outbuildings were either damaged or destroyed, a church was destroyed, and vehicles were damaged, with some being overturned. Many trees and power lines were downed as well. Four people were injured.
EF1	N of Rushing	Stone	AR	35.7494°N 92.2844°W	2207 – 2214	4.14 mi (6.66 km)	300 yd (270 m)	Two chicken houses and a hay barn were damaged and trees and power lines were downed.
EF2	NW of Mt. Olive	Izard	AR	36.0054°N 92.0971°W	2244 – 2246	1.25 mi (2.01 km)	100 yd (91 m)	A brief, but strong tornado along the White River removed the roof of a log house and shifted the house off of its foundation. An adjacent garage was destroyed as well. Elsewhere, several other houses sustained minor damage, with a tree falling on one, a covered porch torn from another, and several more suffering shingle damage. A boat dock on the river was turned over and destroyed and two boats were sunk. Hundreds of trees were downed along the path as well.
EF1	St. Albans	Franklin	MO	38.5883°N 90.7869°W	0038 – 0039	1.32 mi (2.12 km)	200 yd (180 m)	Many trees were downed on the southern bank of the Missouri River.
EF2	Bridgeton to Florissant	St. Louis	MO	38.7608°N 90.4297°W	0100 – 0105	6.75 mi (10.86 km)	500 yd (460 m)	The tornado touched down in Bridgeton and caused roof damage to a skating rink. The tornado moved northeast and caused sporadic tree damage before intensifying to EF2 strength on the north side of Hazelwood, where the roof was torn off of a home. Ten apartment buildings were damaged, with five losing portions of their roofs. The tornado turned east-northeastward and caused varying degrees of roof damage to several houses, some of which was caused by falling trees. It continued east-northeast, downing more trees before dissipating in Florissant. Two strip malls sustained roof damage and several business signs were damaged. Overall, nearly 400 structures were damaged, 55 of which were either heavily damaged or destroyed. Two people suffered minor injuries.
EF0	The Hill	St. Louis City	MO	38.6099°N 90.2867°W	0110 – 0111	0.25 mi (0.40 km)	50 yd (46 m)	Many homes, garages, and sheds were damaged, with one home losing much of its roof. Several vehicles were badly damaged due to flying/falling debris and numerous trees were downed.
EF1	Garrett Bridge	Lincoln	AR	33.8242°N 91.6849°W	0126 – 0133	6.72 mi (10.81 km)	400 yd (370 m)	Two mobile homes were destroyed, one of which rolled over and smashed into a large tree, and a church had roof, window, and door damage. A large shed collapsed onto farm machinery and two grain bins were dented. One house had its walls cracked and several other site-built homes and mobile homes sustained roof damage. About three dozen sheds and outbuildings were destroyed and a large garage had a wall blown in. Numerous trees were downed, a few of which fell onto homes.
EF0	ESE of Poplar Bluff	Butler	MO	36.6886°N 90.3234°W	0158 – 0200	1.73 mi (2.78 km)	75 yd (69 m)	The roofs and some walls of two sheds/barns were removed and blown several hundred yards. The rafters were removed from the structures as well.
EF0	NNW of Dudley	Stoddard	MO	36.8005°N 90.1256°W	0205 – 0207	1.53 mi (2.46 km)	50 yd (46 m)	At least four chicken houses lost part of their roofs and sustained damage to rafters. Debris was carried about 1.5 mi (2.4 km).

=== April 11 event ===
List of confirmed tornadoes – Thursday, April 11, 2013
EF#	Location	County / Parish	State	Start Coord.	Time (UTC)	Path length	Max width	Summary
EF3	SW of Damascus, MS to E of Ethelsville, AL	Kemper (MS), Noxubee (MS), Pickens (AL)	MS, AL	32.6393°N 88.8665°W	1635 – 1806	68.4 mi (110.1 km)	1,320 yd (1,210 m)	1 death – This long-tracked wedge tornado touched down in Kemper County, where a several-story steel building was destroyed just north of Moscow. A frame home was completely destroyed west of DeKalb. In Noxubee County, to the west and north of Shuqualak, a home was destroyed, and several others suffered significant damage. Power poles were snapped as well, including high tension poles. West of Prairie Point, a microwave tower was crumbled and bent to the ground. In both Kemper and Noxubee counties, many homes sustained roof and wall damage, numerous barns and outbuildings were either heavily damaged or destroyed, and a few vehicles were smashed and overturned. Thousands of trees were downed, and numerous power poles were snapped. The tornado then crossed the state line into Alabama and entered Pickens County northwest of Pickensville, where it destroyed several outbuildings and caused significant damage to a well-built two-story home. Several homes and manufactured homes were destroyed, and hundreds of trees were downed before the tornado dissipated near Ethelsville. The damage in Pickens County was rated EF1. Nine people were injured; five in Kemper County and four in Noxubee County.
EF1	SE of Lacombe to N of Slidell	St. Tammany	LA	30.2780°N 89.8921°W	1805 – 1814	8.76 mi (14.10 km)	120 yd (110 m)	Weak tornado with an intermittent path caused minor to moderate roof and siding damage to several homes. Numerous trees, power lines, and fences were downed as well.
EF1	S of Nauvoo	Walker	AL	33.9197°N 87.5361°W	1945 – 1951	5.49 mi (8.84 km)	500 yd (460 m)	A house lost portions of its roof and roof decking. A few buildings sustained minor structural damage and many trees were downed as well.
EF1	NE of Nauvoo	Winston	AL	34.0128°N 87.4332°W	1957 – 2000	2.63 mi (4.23 km)	250 yd (230 m)	The roof was removed from a home, another home was damaged, a large shed was demolished, and the office at a strip mine was damaged. Many trees were downed, with one falling on a mobile home, another crushing a produce stand, and several more falling on numerous other houses.
EF1	W of Houston	Winston	AL	34.1421°N 87.3203°W	2010 – 2013	1.17 mi (1.88 km)	300 yd (270 m)	The tornado downed numerous trees before moving across Smith Lake, where it destroyed a boat house and flipped a pontoon boat. The tornado moved back onshore and downed more trees, with several falling on homes and sheds, before it dissipated.
EF1	ESE of Addison	Winston	AL	34.1931°N 87.1196°W	2026 – 2027	0.38 mi (0.61 km)	50 yd (46 m)	Brief tornado completely demolished two sheds, damaged a double-wide mobile home, and downed several large trees. It also rolled two additional mobile homes about 50 yards (46 m). One person was injured.
EF1	SSW of Centreville to S of Montevallo	Bibb	AL	32.8455°N 87.1709°W	2118 – 2141	20.16 mi (32.44 km)	800 yd (730 m)	One home had siding torn off and many trees were downed in the Talladega National Forest before the tornado lifted just inside Bibb County.
EF1	S of Huntsville	Madison	AL	34.6146°N 86.6387°W	2120 – 2128	6.58 mi (10.59 km)	300 yd (270 m)	The tornado downed many trees and power lines, with a few trees falling on homes. A few homes and a metal building sustained mostly minor wind damage, several power poles and a street light were snapped at the base, and several business signs were blown out as well.
EF1	ESE of Huntsville	Madison	AL	34.7017°N 86.5049°W	2132 – 2134	1.34 mi (2.16 km)	75 yd (69 m)	Many trees were downed, several power poles were snapped, and the roof was ripped off of a barn.
EF0	S of Tallapoosa	Haralson	GA	33.675°N 85.305°W	2223 – 2231	5.7 mi (9.2 km)	150 yd (140 m)	The tornado initially touched down south-southwest of Tallapoosa, where it downed several dozen trees and caused minor roof damage to three homes. It then crossed I-20, downing more trees on both sides of the road. The tornado continued northeastward, downing many more trees and causing minor roof damage to a flower shop before lifting east-southeast of Tallapoosa.
EF1	SE of Theodore	Mobile	AL	30.5131°N 88.1456°W	2229 – 2230	0.81 mi (1.30 km)	75 yd (69 m)	Three large storage warehouses, numerous vehicles, and several outbuildings were severely damaged at the Evonik chemical processing plant. About 30 employee vehicles had their windows broken by flying debris.
EF1	W of Braswell	Polk	GA	33.988°N 84.995°W	2301 – 2302	0.36 mi (0.58 km)	25 yd (23 m)	A brief tornado downed about 100 trees.
EF2	Notasulga	Macon, Lee	AL	32.5327°N 85.7365°W	0134 – 0144	5.09 mi (8.19 km)	200 yd (180 m)	This strong tornado touched down southwest of Notasulga, where several trees were downed, and grave markers were overturned at a cemetery. It moved north-northeastward, where several homes and outbuildings were either damaged or destroyed. A brick home had major roof and window loss, and one mobile home had significant damage, with another being completely destroyed. The tornado continued, causing significant damage to a well-built two-story home: Two walls and the roof were destroyed. It continued northeastward, damaging an outbuilding pavilion before crossing into Lee County and quickly dissipating. Many trees were downed along the path. One person was injured.
EF1	SE of Dahlonega to SE of Garland	Lumpkin, Hall	GA	34.4515°N 83.9300°W	0223 – 0229	4.07 mi (6.55 km)	250 yd (230 m)	In Lumpkin County, a small outbuilding had its roof blown off and two homes sustained minor roof damage. Many trees were downed, several of which damaged at least twelve homes and destroyed two others. The tornado crossed into Hall County, downing trees and power lines and causing very minor roof damage to two homes. It then moved back into Lumpkin County, where two mobile homes were damaged due to falling trees. Many trees and power lines were downed before the tornado dissipated. In total, 41 homes sustained damage, with two being completely destroyed, three sustaining major damage, and three more suffering minor damage. The others were only barely affected by the tornado.

=== April 13 event ===
List of confirmed tornadoes – Sunday, April 13, 2013
EF#	Location	County / Parish	State	Start Coord.	Time (UTC)	Path length	Max width	Summary
EF0	SW of Alpine-Casparis Municipal Airport	Brewster	TX	30.3006°N 103.7755°W	2030 – 2034	2.61 mi (4.20 km)	300 yd (270 m)	A tornado was observed by storm spotters. It lofted debris into the air but caused no damage.

=== April 14 event ===
List of confirmed tornadoes – Monday, April 14, 2013
EF#	Location	County	State	Start Coord.	Time (UTC)	Path length	Max width	Summary
EF0	Eastpoint	Franklin	FL	29.7484°N 84.8935°W	1930 – 1933	1.86 mi (2.99 km)	10 yd (9.1 m)	A waterspout moved ashore just west of Eastpoint, causing minor damage to two mobile homes and downing trees and power lines before dissipating southeast of town.
EF0	E of Cocoa	Brevard	FL	28.3771°N 80.7388°W	0042 – 0043	0.33 mi (0.53 km)	100 yd (91 m)	A brief tornado touched down near US 1, causing roof damage to outbuildings and businesses. It also downed trees and power lines before moving over the Indian River and becoming a waterspout. It then dissipated on the river.
EF0	SSW of Rockledge	Brevard	FL	28.2730°N 80.7507°W	0111 – 0113	0.55 mi (0.89 km)	100 yd (91 m)	A tornado embedded within a swath of straight-line winds west of Bonaventure caused mostly minor roof damage to numerous homes, with roofing materials and other debris carried and thrown into the windows of several other structures. A fence was blown down and numerous swimming pool screen enclosures were collapsed.

=== April 17 event ===
List of confirmed tornadoes – Wednesday, April 17, 2013
EF#	Location	County / Parish	State	Start Coord.	Time (UTC)	Path length	Max width	Summary
EF1	NE of Tulip to S of Paris	Monroe	MO	39.3775°N 92.1188°W	2231–2241	7.45 mi (11.99 km)	70 yd (64 m)	An intermittent tornado either damaged or destroyed many barns and machine sheds, scattering debris up to 400 yards (370 m) away. Numerous trees and power lines were downed as well.
EF0	SSW of Paris	Monroe	MO	39.4018°N 92.0592°W	2235–2236	0.07 mi (0.11 km)	40 yd (37 m)	A brief tornado caused moderate roof and structural damage to a barn.
EF0	SW of Indian Creek	Monroe	MO	39.5863°N 91.8011°W	2300–2301	0.45 mi (0.72 km)	60 yd (55 m)	A brief tornado caused minor roof damage and downed several trees.
EF0	SE of Cache	Comanche	OK	34.58°N 98.5633°W	2350–2356	3.41 mi (5.49 km)	100 yd (91 m)	Minor damage occurred at a Goodyear plant.
EF0	NNE of Harrold (1st tornado)	Wilbarger	TX	34.17°N 98.98°W	0103–0105	1.03 mi (1.66 km)	100 yd (91 m)	A tornado caused minor damage to trees and power poles.
EF0	NNE of Harrold (2nd tornado)	Wilbarger	TX	34.20°N 98.97°W	0111–0112	0.16 mi (0.26 km)	100 yd (91 m)	A brief tornado was reported by storm chaser.
EF1	WNW of Grandfield	Tillman	OK	34.2688°N 98.8032°W	0135–0145	5.21 mi (8.38 km)	200 yd (180 m)	This tornado caused damage at the Grandfield Municipal Airport.
EF0	NW of Liberty	Tulsa	OK	35.8715°N 96.0166°W	0450–0451	0.5 mi (0.80 km)	50 yd (46 m)	A brief tornado blew a car off US 75 and downed a few trees.

=== April 18 event ===
List of confirmed tornadoes – Thursday, April 18, 2013
EF#	Location	County / Parish	State	Start Coord.	Time (UTC)	Path length	Max width	Summary
EF0	NE of Bixby (1st tornado)	Tulsa	OK	35.9739°N 95.8363°W	0501–0503	1.3 mi (2.1 km)	250 yd (230 m)	Several homes were damaged and trees were downed.
EF1	NE of Bixby (2nd tornado)	Tulsa	OK	35.9700°N 95.8503°W	0503–0505	2.1 mi (3.4 km)	400 yd (370 m)	A tornado severely damaged the second story of a home and damaged many other homes. Windows were blown out of a few homes and trees were downed as well.
EF0	SSW of Inola	Rogers	OK	36.0989°N 95.5336°W	0528–0529	0.9 mi (1.4 km)	125 yd (114 m)	A barn was badly damaged, a home suffered minor roof damage, and several trees were downed.
EF1	SW of Inola	Rogers	OK	36.1216°N 95.5246°W	0529–0532	1.8 mi (2.9 km)	140 yd (130 m)	Rail cars were overturned, a mobile home was destroyed, and several other mobile homes were damaged.
EF1	E of Inola	Rogers	OK	36.1465°N 95.5014°W	0533–0536	1.9 mi (3.1 km)	180 yd (160 m)	Several houses suffered roof damage, a metal frame building was badly damaged, and a small outbuilding was destroyed.
EF1	NE of Chouteau to NW of Salina	Mayes	OK	36.2500°N 95.2861°W	0548–0558	6.5 mi (10.5 km)	100 yd (91 m)	The roof was removed from an industrial building, a barn was destroyed, and numerous trees were downed.
EF1	Spavinaw	Mayes	OK	36.3752°N 95.0788°W	0607–0613	3.5 mi (5.6 km)	350 yd (320 m)	Several mobile homes were destroyed and many other homes and businesses were damaged. The roof of a school was severely damaged and many trees and power lines were downed.
EF2	E of Zena to SE of Grove	Delaware	OK	36.4918°N 94.7809°W	0630–0640	8 mi (13 km)	800 yd (730 m)	One home was severely damaged, other homes suffered minor damage, and barns were destroyed. Many trees and numerous power poles were downed.
EF0	W of Elliott	Ford	IL	40.4563°N 88.3207°W	1336–1337	0.57 mi (0.92 km)	20 yd (18 m)	A brief tornado hit a barn and killed two horses. Six power poles were downed as well.
EF1	SSE of Crossett	Ashley	AR	33.0432°N 91.97°W	2008–2014	4.25 mi (6.84 km)	150 yd (140 m)	Many large trees were downed.
EF0	SE of Eudora	Chicot	AR	33.0751°N 91.2272°W	2138–2139	0.45 mi (0.72 km)	50 yd (46 m)	A brief tornado touched down in an open field and caused no damage.
EF1	N of Mayersville	Issaquena	MS	32.944°N 91.061°W	2203–2205	1.98 mi (3.19 km)	50 yd (46 m)	A farm pivot was overturned and a few trees were downed.
EF0	SW of Tribbett	Washington	MS	33.3193°N 90.8568°W	2209–2210	0.27 mi (0.43 km)	50 yd (46 m)	A brief tornado that was observed over open fields caused no damage.
EF1	N of Sondheimer	East Carroll	LA	32.5705°N 91.2043°W	2219–2223	2.87 mi (4.62 km)	75 yd (69 m)	A tornado destroyed a large farm outbuilding, damaged two homes, and caused minor damage to a few other structures. It also downed many trees and power lines.
EF0	Nitta Yuma	Sharkey	MS	33.027°N 90.87°W	2221–2223	1.55 mi (2.49 km)	50 yd (46 m)	A tornado was caught on camera as it moved over open fields, causing no damage.
EF0	N of Tallulah	Madison	LA	32.448°N 91.216°W	2223–2224	0.4 mi (0.64 km)	50 yd (46 m)	A brief tornado touched down over an open field and kicked up dust. No damage was reported.
EF0	ESE of Delta City	Sharkey	MS	33.0655°N 90.7431°W	2229–2230	0.27 mi (0.43 km)	25 yd (23 m)	A brief tornado caused minor roof damage to a home and snapped a large tree.
EF0	SE of Water Valley	Graves	KY	36.5479°N 88.7334°W	0124–0125	0.33 mi (0.53 km)	100 yd (91 m)	Shingles were ripped off two homes, and one home sustained soffit damage. A couple large tree branches were downed.
EF0	W of Sedalia	Graves	KY	36.6065°N 88.6542°W	0131–0135	3.17 mi (5.10 km)	100 yd (91 m)	Several large tree branches were downed.
EF0	NW of Benton	Graves, Marshall	KY	36.8578°N 88.52°W	0154–0159	3.6 mi (5.8 km)	150 yd (140 m)	Several homes sustained shingle and soffit damage. Several trees were snapped, and large branches were downed as well.

=== April 19 event ===
List of confirmed tornadoes – Friday, April 19, 2013
EF#	Location	County / Parish	State	Start Coord.	Time (UTC)	Path length	Max width	Summary
EF1	Mulberry to SE of Lynchburg	Lincoln, Moore	TN	35.2169°N 86.4448°W	0703 – 0715	7.27 mi (11.70 km)	400 yd (370 m)	The tornado touched down in northeast Lincoln County, causing minor damage to a barn and downing several trees before moving into Moore County. After crossing the county line, the tornado downed many more trees, with one falling on the back of a house. It also snapped a telecommunication pole and peeled the roof off of a large barn.
EF2	SW of Mansfield to ENE of Newborn	Newton, Morgan	GA	33.5069°N 83.7465°W	1712 – 1722	11.04 mi (17.77 km)	175 yd (160 m)	This low-end EF2 tornado damaged about eight homes and destroyed another home (this one was older) and a mobile home in Mansfield. A few other buildings in downtown were damaged and several outbuildings were damaged in a park. The tornado downed many trees from Mansfield to Newborn and into Morgan County, where the tornado dissipated. One person was injured in the destroyed mobile home in Mansfield.
EF1	WNW of Downtown Fredericksburg	City of Fredericksburg	VA	38.30°N 77.49°W	2236 – 2237	0.75 mi (1.21 km)	150 yd (140 m)	A brief tornado ripped roofing and ventilation from a shopping plaza and ripped the roof off of an apartment building. Other buildings sustained roof damage and numerous trees were downed as well.
EF0	SSE of Largo	Prince George's	MD	38.837°N 76.813°W	2326 – 2327	0.5 mi (0.80 km)	75 yd (69 m)	Three homes had windows and doors blown out, with a garage that was attached to one home having a collapsed wall. Several other homes had minor siding and shingle damage and several trees were downed as well.
EF1	SSE of Bainbridge to S of Sidney	Chenango, Delaware	NY	42.2472°N 75.452°W	2353 – 2358	3.2 mi (5.1 km)	200 yd (180 m)	The tornado initially touched down near I-88, snapping two power poles and downing several trees. Two vehicles were damaged, one of which was due to trees, and a barn had minor roof damage. It continued northeast, where a storage trailer was destroyed and a farm equipment building, and a mobile home were heavily damaged. Several site-built homes had minor damage and a carport was thrown 75 feet (23 m). Farther down the path, the tornado intensified to a high-end EF1, where it downed many large trees and caused structural damage to a home and a garage. Debris from the home was carried over 100 yards (91 m). The tornado moved into Delaware County and downed several more trees before dissipating.

=== April 24 event ===
List of confirmed tornadoes – Wednesday, April 24, 2013
EF#	Location	County / Parish	State	Start Coord.	Time (UTC)	Path length	Max width	Summary
EF0	N of St. Gabriel	Iberville	LA	30.301°N 91.109°W	1455 – 1457	0.38 mi (0.61 km)	75 yd (69 m)	A brief, weak tornado downed several trees, including five to ten oaks, and removed the roof from a storage shed.
EF1	Northwestern Kenner	Jefferson	LA	30.044°N 90.272°W	1648 – 1650	0.9 mi (1.4 km)	50 yd (46 m)	About a dozen homes suffered minor to moderate roof damage and numerous trees, light poles, and power lines were downed.
EF0	Western Metairie	Jefferson	LA	30.009°N 90.200°W	1652 – 1656	2.23 mi (3.59 km)	75 yd (69 m)	A weak tornado caused minor roof damage to several homes and flipped a truck. It also downed several trees, one of which fell onto a car, and ripped a metal awning from a breezeway at Crescent City Christian School. Two people sustained minor injuries when the tornado impacted their aforementioned truck.

=== April 26 event ===
List of confirmed tornadoes – Friday, April 26, 2013
EF#	Location	County	State	Start Coord.	Time (UTC)	Path length	Max width	Summary
EF0	N of Putnam	Dewey	OK	35.95°N 98.99°W	2331 – 2333	0.16 mi (0.26 km)	50 yd (46 m)	A brief tornado was observed by a storm spotter but caused no damage.

=== April 27 event ===
List of confirmed tornadoes – Saturday, April 27, 2013
EF#	Location	County / Parish	State	Start Coord.	Time (UTC)	Path length	Max width	Summary
EF1	W of Bienville	Bienville	LA	32.3800°N 93.0949°W	0132 – 0144	2.29 mi (3.69 km)	880 yd (800 m)	Several trees were downed near Sparta.
EF1	SE of Mason	Fayette	TN	35.3746°N 89.4956°W	0213 – 0218	1.12 mi (1.80 km)	250 yd (230 m)	A brief tornado just north of I-40 in the Belmont community destroyed a barn and several outbuildings, moved a small church 15 feet (4.6 m) off of its foundation, and downed many trees. One person suffered minor injuries.
EF2	SE of Pope	Panola	MS	34.184°N 89.9106°W	0255 – 0257	0.79 mi (1.27 km)	75 yd (69 m)	This brief but strong tornado destroyed a shop (probably a business) and overturned an RV and a flat-bed truck. Two houses and two sheds (a tractor shed and a small metal shed) had roof damage and many trees were downed.

=== April 28 event ===
List of confirmed tornadoes – Saturday, April 28, 2013
EF#	Location	County	State	Start Coord.	Time (UTC)	Path length	Max width	Summary
EF0	ENE of Moreland	Coweta	GA	33.2877°N 84.7611°W	1730 – 1731	0.14 mi (0.23 km)	50 yd (46 m)	A large outbuilding was destroyed and a home sustained patio and roof damage. Debris from these structures was blown up to 150 yards (140 m). A pontoon boat and a camper trailer were both thrown about 50 yards (46 m) and destroyed and six weak trees (showing signs of rot) were downed as well.
EF0	ENE of McDonough	Henry	GA	33.4733°N 84.0381°W	1920 – 1921	1.05 mi (1.69 km)	100 yd (91 m)	A weak, intermittent tornado downed a few trees, damaged the siding of five houses, and caused damage to the roof of an outbuilding.
EF0	S of Clay Hill	Lincoln	GA	33.6543°N 82.4636°W	2208 – 2210	1.24 mi (2.00 km)	40 yd (37 m)	Many trees were downed.
EF0	ENE of Ridgeway	Fairfield	SC	34.31°N 80.91°W	2342 – 2343	0.25 mi (0.40 km)	50 yd (46 m)	An antenna on a mobile home was damaged and several trees were downed, a few of which caused minor damage to a car and an outbuilding.

=== April 29 event ===
List of confirmed tornadoes – Monday, April 29, 2013
EF#	Location	County	State	Start Coord.	Time (UTC)	Path length	Max width	Summary
EF0	N of Taft (1st tornado)	San Patricio	TX	28.04°N 97.38°W	1801 – 1811	1.66 mi (2.67 km)	20 yd (18 m)	A slow-moving tornado remained over open fields for ten minutes, causing no damage.
EF0	N of Taft (2nd tornado)	San Patricio	TX	28.0958°N 97.38°W	1826 – 1828	0.1 mi (0.16 km)	10 yd (9.1 m)	A brief tornado reported by law enforcement caused no damage.
EF0	S of Vidauri	Refugio	TX	28.4207°N 97.1312°W	1856 – 1900	0.22 mi (0.35 km)	10 yd (9.1 m)	A brief tornado north of Quintana caused no damage.

=== April 30 event ===
List of confirmed tornadoes – Tuesday, April 30, 2013
EF#	Location	County / Parish	State	Start Coord.	Time (UTC)	Path length	Max width	Summary
EF0	South Palm Beach	Palm Beach	FL	26.5811°N 80.0376°W	1756 – 1757	0.14 mi (0.23 km)	10 yd (9.1 m)	A waterspout moved onshore near La Coquille Villas, causing minor roof damage, breaking windows, and downing trees before quickly dissipating.
EF0	W of Woodrow	Lubbock	TX	33.4475°N 101.8582°W	2218 – 2219	0.12 mi (0.19 km)	10 yd (9.1 m)	A brief landspout tornado formed along an outflow boundary from a nearby microburst and remained over open fields, causing no damage.

== See also ==
- Tornadoes of 2013
- List of United States tornadoes from January to February 2013
- List of United States tornadoes in May 2013
