= Blasingame =

Blasingame may refer to:

- Don Blasingame (1932–2005), a baseball player
- Jim Blasingame, a small business advocate
- Khari Blasingame (born 1996), American football player
- Marguerite Louis Blasingame (1906–1947), an American sculptor
- Wade Blasingame (born 1943), a baseball player
