= Walkabout Travel Gear =

Online retailer of travel accessories

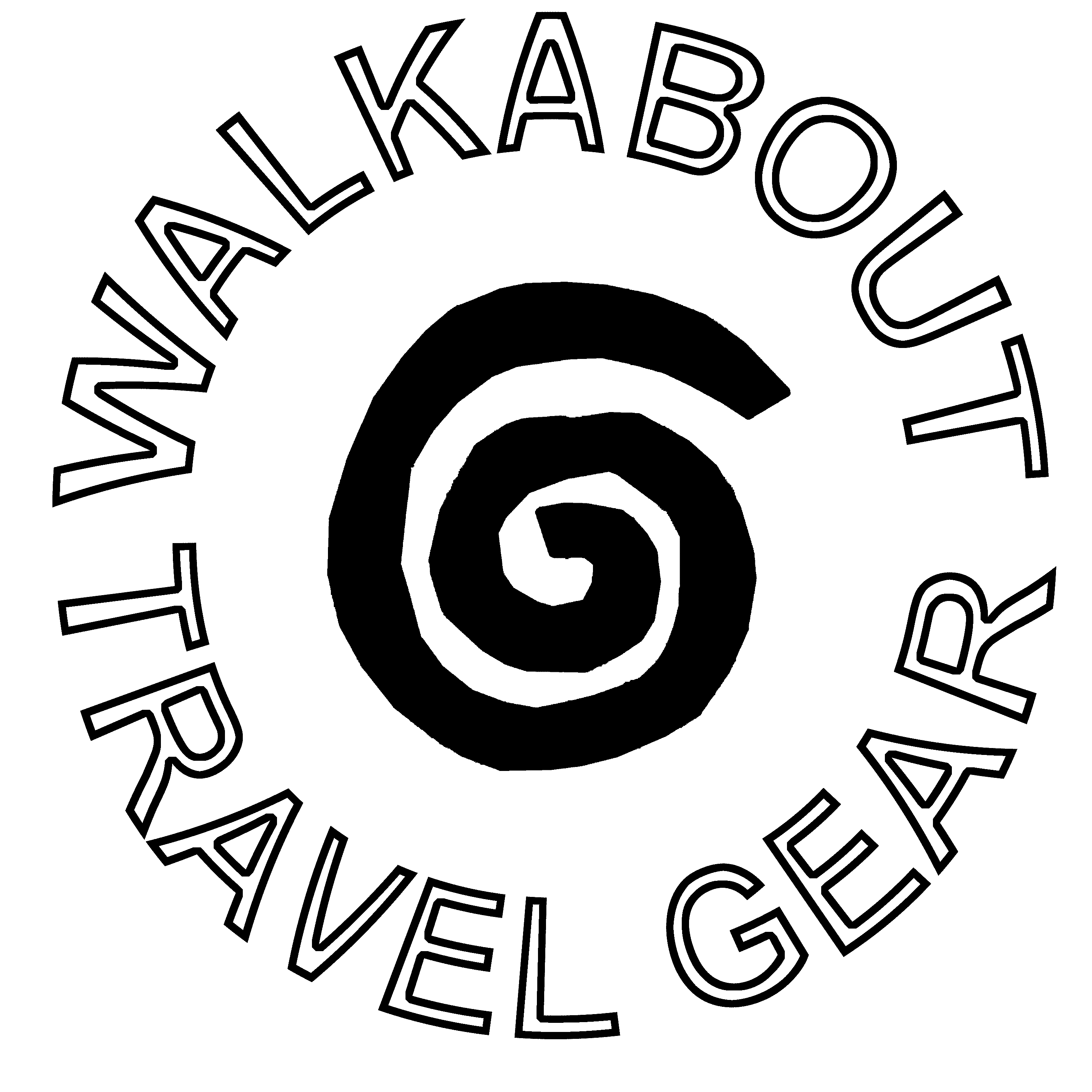
- Industry: Internet Sale
- Founded: May 3, 1995
- Founder: Gia and Bradford Boyle

Walkabout Travel Gear was an online retailer of travel accessories that was, at the time, one of few companies to begin selling on the Internet. The company went online in November 1995. The first capture by archive.org was on December 23, 1996. The domain name "walkabouttravelgear.com" was not secured until early 1996. The internet address upon startup was xmission.com/~walkgear/walk.htm. A printout of the website dated June 29, 1996, is available.

== Founding ==
Walkabout Travel Gear was founded by Gia and Bradford Grant Boyle. Their original inspiration came on March 3, 1995, on the island of Malta. While on a European backpacking trip, the couple noticed there was a lack of travel gear companies targeting independent travellers on a budget. They cut their journey short, returning home to Salt Lake City, Utah. They used their remaining savings to research, purchase inventory, and produce a print catalog. The catalog was designed to capture the practicality as well as the cost consciousness of the products. Bradford Grant Boyle had previous graphics experience.

The novelty of an internet business plus Walkabout Travel Gear's niche market quickly caught the attention of Utah then national media. Deseret News ran an article in early 1996, and KSL-TV television included them in its weekly business show. National publications including the Wall Street Journal, New York Times, Los Angeles Times, and Fortune Small Business mentioned the company. The walkabouttravelgear.com website won awards including Point's Top 5% of All Websites and Top Shopping Site Award by the All-Internet Shopping Site Directory.

== Growth ==
Once the business was established, the Boyles moved to Moab, Utah, in 1996 as the online business allowed them to live in the city of their choice. A retail outlet was opened at 88 East Center Street. The venture was short lived, as the couple decided to solely focus on the internet. Additional publicity occurred when the Boyles converted an old 36 foot motorhome into a mobile office. Named Bessie, the motorhome allowed the business to become mobile, possibly the first internet business to do so.

The increasing need for international travelers to use their laptops as well as access the internet created a demand for electrical adapters, converters, and telephone adapters. While today most electronics are dual voltage 100-240V and capable of handling electricity worldwide, previously many of them needed a voltage converter. Also, there are a multitude of electric outlet styles and an adapter is often required. Prior to the invention of Wi-Fi, a modem was needed to connect to the internet and had to be physically connected to a telephone jack and plug.

While remaining focused on the original niche market of independent travelers, Walkabout Travel Gear grew into a large supplier of converters and adapters. Travel guidebook series like Fodor's and Lonely Planet recommended them. In 2012 the Walkabout Solution was released, combining automatically switching voltage supply and several of the most common outlet adapters. Extremely popular, the device eliminated the needed for traveling with several adapters and a converter.

By 2006 the company had grown dramatically and moved to a fulfillment center in Healdsburg, California. As the internet matured, so did Walkabout Travel Gear. After 26 years of online success, the company paused operations because of the COVID-19 pandemic. Demand for travel accessories was very limited with worldwide travel restrictions.
