= Gymkata =

1985 film

- Theatrical release poster
- Directed by: Robert Clouse
- Screenplay by: Charles Robert Carner
- Based on: The Terrible Game by Dan Tyler Moore
- Produced by: Rebecca Poole; Fred Weintraub
- Starring: Kurt Thomas; Tetchie Agbayani; Richard Norton; Edward Bell
- Cinematography: Godfrey A. Godar
- Edited by: Robert A. Ferretti
- Music by: Alfi Kabiljo
- Production company: Metro-Goldwyn-Mayer
- Distributed by: MGM/UA Entertainment Co.
- Release date: May 3, 1985
- Running time: 90 minutes
- Language: English
- Box office: $5.7 million

Gymkata is a 1985 martial arts film directed by Robert Clouse, based on Dan Tyler Moore's 1957 novel The Terrible Game. It stars Olympic gymnast Kurt Thomas as Jonathan Cabot, an Olympic gymnast who combines his gymnastic ability with martial arts to enter a deadly competition in a fictional country, Parmistan. Supporting cast members includes Tetchie Agbayani as Princess Rubali, alongside Richard Norton, Edward Bell, John Barrett, Conan Lee, Bob Schott and Buck Kartalian. The film was released in the United States on May 3, 1985.

== Plot ==
Jonathan Cabot is approached by the Special Intelligence Agency (SIA) to play "the Game". The Game is an athletic competition in the fictional country of Parmistan, a tiny mountain nation in the Hindu Kush mountain range. Parmistan forces all foreigners to play the Game, which is an endurance race with obstacles, all the while being chased by local Parmistan warriors. If a person wins, they are granted their life and a wish. The SIA wants Jonathan to win the game so that he can use his wish to install a US satellite monitoring station, which could monitor all satellites in space and act as an early warning system in case of a nuclear attack. As an extra incentive, Jonathan is also told that his father Colonel Cabot (who went missing) was actually an SIA operative who was sent to play the Game but was never heard from again.

After a training period with a martial arts teacher, a Japanese guru, and a beautiful Parmistan princess named Rubali, Jonathan is deemed ready and sent to the town of Karabal on the Caspian Sea for infiltration into Parmistan. While in Karabal, he is attacked by terrorist agents who kidnap Rubali. Jonathan quickly raids the terrorist training center and, using his unstoppable "gymkata" fighting style that combines gymnastics with karate, easily disables dozens of terrorists before rescuing the princess and returning to the salt mine where he is staying. However, when he returns, he finds out that his handler Colonel John "Stork" Mackle has betrayed him to the enemy. Luckily, the SIA arrives in the nick of time to save him.

Jonathan and Rubali use a raft to float down the river into Parmistan where they are promptly seized by Parmistan warriors and, after a fight, Jonathan is knocked out. When he wakes up, he is in the palace of Parmistan's ruler, known as the Khan, and is greeted by other players of the Game who have also arrived to play it. While waiting for the Game to start, Jonathan learns from Rubali that the Khan's right-hand man and manager of the Game, Commander Zamir, is actually planning a coup against the Khan and will attempt to sell the satellite rights to the enemy. Zamir also intends to marry Rubali to solidify his claim to the throne.

With all this in mind, Jonathan starts the Game, but soon learns that Zamir won't play fair and constantly breaks the strict rules to kill the contestants. Meanwhile, the Khan's forces have been overpowered by Zamir's private army in the coup attempt, which the Khan is tricked into believing is a set of security measures for his protection.

Fighting many obstacles, including a crooked, sadistic participant named Thorg, Jonathan is soon the only player left in the Game. About to be killed by crazed villagers, he is saved by a Parmistan warrior who turns out to be his father, Colonel Cabot. Cabot explains that while playing the Game, he fell and disabled his arm, but was allowed by Parmistan warriors to live. As the two catch up, Zamir fires an arrow into Cabot, who tells Jonathan to go on and win the race. Jonathan races off, chased by Zamir's army. He is able to make his horse jump a gorge and gets away while only Zamir is brave enough to follow. Seeing that Zamir won't let him escape, Jonathan decides to face him and, after a prolonged fight, his gymkata skills allow him to kill Zamir.

Meanwhile, Rubali finally convinces her father that Zamir is plotting to overthrow the monarchy. Using their combined fighting skills, the princess and the Khan attack Zamir's men before encouraging the citizens of Parmistan to rise up and seize the rest. As the crowd takes down Zamir's army, Jonathan arrives with Colonel Cabot, who is still alive. The crowd cheers the champion, and as the movie ends, the audience is informed that in 1985, the first satellite monitoring station was installed.

== Cast ==
- Kurt Thomas as Jonathan Cabot
- Tetchie Agbayani as Princess Rubali
- Richard Norton as Commander Zamir
- Edward Bell as Paley
- John Barrett as Gomez
- Conan Lee as Hao
- Bob Schott as Thorg
- Buck Kartalian as The Kahn
- Eric Lawson as Colonel Cabot
- Sonny Barnes as Western Trainer
- Tadashi Yamashita as Eastern Trainer
- Sharan Lea as Connie
- Zlatko Pokupec as Colonel John "Stork" Mackle
- Slobodan Dimitrijević as Tamerlane
- Ivo Kristof as Brockschmidt

== Production ==
The film is based on the 1957 novel The Terrible Game by Dan Tyler Moore, adapted for the screen by Charles Robert Carner (of Blind Fury fame), and shot in Yugoslavia. Producer Jack H. Harris first acquired the rights for Universal-International to develop it as a potential vehicle for Rock Hudson. The rights were then acquired by Fred Weintraub.

=== Casting ===
Filipino actress Tetchie Agbayani was cast as Princess Rubali, the love interest to Kurt Thomas' character Jonathan Cabot after she finished her scenes for the film The Emerald Forest, where she played Brazilian tribal member Caya. Having moved to the United States in 1982, she had originally intended to retire as an actress and "be a normal person" prior to receiving the two roles. She would later return to the Philippines in 1987 to resume her film career in her home country. Christopher Atkins was initially considered for the role of Jonathan.

== Release ==
Gymkata was released in the United States on May 3, 1985.

In the Philippines, the film was released by Action Films Co. on February 10, 1988. An unrelated Australian film, Day of the Panther, was later released in the Philippines as Gymkata 2 by Jadestar Films in February 1989 to capitalize off of Gymkata's success; actor Kurt Thomas is dubiously promoted as the film's original lead actor that had to be replaced by John Stazak due to breaking his spine from a failed somersault "on the second day shooting".

=== Reception ===
Gymkata earned a Golden Raspberry Award nomination for Thomas as Worst New Star at the 6th Golden Raspberry Awards. It has developed a minor cult following as an unintentional comedy for its dubious premise, poor production quality and strange setting. Maxim lists the film as the 17th "Worst Movie of All Time".

The 1993 Filipino comedy film Gin Kata, starring Herbert Bautista and directed by Nestor Arsenal, is titled in reference to Gymkata.

Review aggregator Rotten Tomatoes gives it a rating of 17% from 12 reviews. Metacritic gave it a score of 51 out of 100 based on 7 critical evaluations, indicating "mixed or average" reviews. Audiences polled by CinemaScore gave the film an average grade of "C+" on an A+ to F scale.

== Home media ==
After winning an Internet poll conducted by Warner Bros. and Amazon during June 2006, the film was released to DVD on January 30, 2007.
