= Kip Box =

American bishop

Kip A. Box is the Administrative Bishop for Western North Carolina, Church of God (Cleveland, Tennessee).

== Early life ==
Box is a native of Addison, Alabama. He holds a bachelor's degree in English, History and Secondary Education and a Master of Arts in English and Secondary Education from the University of North Alabama in Florence, Alabama.

== Ordained ministry ==
Box was previously the lead pastor of the Oak Park Church of God in Mobile, Alabama.

At the 2014 Church of God General Assembly, Box was elected to the International Council of Eighteen, which provides administrative oversight of the denomination. He was re-elected to the Council at the 2016 General Assembly.

Box has served as the chairman of the Alabama State Council, the Alabama Evangelism Board, the Alabama Youth Board, and the Smoky Mountain Children Home. He has served on the Chaplain’s Commission and the Church of God International Youth Board.

Box has also worked as a public school teacher.
