= Dan Tyler Moore (author) =

American author and businessman

Dan Tyler Moore, Jr.
- Born: February 1, 1908; Washington, D.C., US
- Died: February 11, 1998 (aged 90); Cleveland Heights, Ohio, US
- Occupations: author businessman SEC commissioner intelligence operative public speaker
- Notable work: The Terrible Game (1957)

Dan Tyler Moore Jr. was an American intelligence officer, SEC regional commissioner, businessman, public speaker, and author. Though involved in many fields and careers during his lifetime, he is perhaps best remembered today for his 1957 pulp novel The Terrible Game, which served as the basis for the 1985 cult film Gymkata.

== Early life and education ==
Dan Tyler Moore Jr. was born on February 1, 1908, in Washington, D.C. His father was Dan Tyler Moore Sr., a military attaché and friend to US President Theodore Roosevelt (and cousin to First Lady Edith Roosevelt), and his mother was Luvean "Luvie" Jones Moore, née Butler. Moore attended St. Albans School in D.C. and later Salisbury School in Salisbury, Connecticut. He graduated from Yale University in 1932 with a degree in physics, and subsequently married sculptor and heiress Elizabeth Oakes in 1932.

== Early career ==
Moore began his career as an investment banker in New York City, and subsequently moved to the U.S. Securities and Exchange Commission under Joseph P. Kennedy. In 1937, he left the national SEC to become the regional administrator for the newly created SEC "zone 4", which covered Ohio, Michigan, Indiana and Kentucky. In this capacity, he wrote Ohio's state securities act.

== OSS ==
During World War II, Moore was brought into the newly established OSS by William J. Donovan. Moore then went to Cairo as a Deputy to James M. Landis, Head of the Economic Mission to Middle East, but also with a secret duty as a regional chief for the OSS. As a regional OSS chief for North Africa, he was involved in disrupting German diamond supplies, foiling an assassination attempt on King George II of Greece and inventing a hoist to airlift spies.

== Post-War career ==
After the war, Moore became involved with a project to build hotels in Turkey. When he returned to America, he settled in Cleveland, Ohio and subsequently established a trade firm with his friend and fellow Cleveland resident Eliot Ness. He became a prominent lecturer during the 1950s, particularly on the subject of fraud and in 1960s became the chairman of the International Platform Association.

== Writing career ==
Moore received a "story by" credit on the 1949 film noir Illegal Entry. By the 1950s, he was a prolific published author, penning a syndicated column on fraud. He had also begun writing short fiction, some of which was published in the Saturday Evening Post. In the April 14, 1956, issue of that magazine, he published a short story called The Terrible Game, which he expanded the next year into an adventure novel of the same title. The book became a best-seller, and was adapted for film under the title Gymkata in 1985. Subsequently, he published several non-fiction books, including Cloak & Cipher (1962, with Martha Waller), Wolves, Widows, and Orphans (1967), and Lecturing for Profit (1967).

== Death ==
Moore died February 11, 1998, in Cleveland Heights, Ohio. He was buried in Lake View Cemetery.

== Partial bibliography ==
=== Short fiction ===
- The Terrible Game (Saturday Evening Post, April 14, 1956)
- The Scent of Danger (Collier's, May 11, 1956)
- The Girl Who Gambled (Saturday Evening Post, February 6, 1960)

=== Novels ===
- The Terrible Game (1957)

=== Nonfiction ===
- Cloak & Cipher (1962, with Martha Waller)
- Wolves, Widows, and Orphans (1967)
- Lecturing for Profit (1967)
