= Jim Blasingame =

American blogger

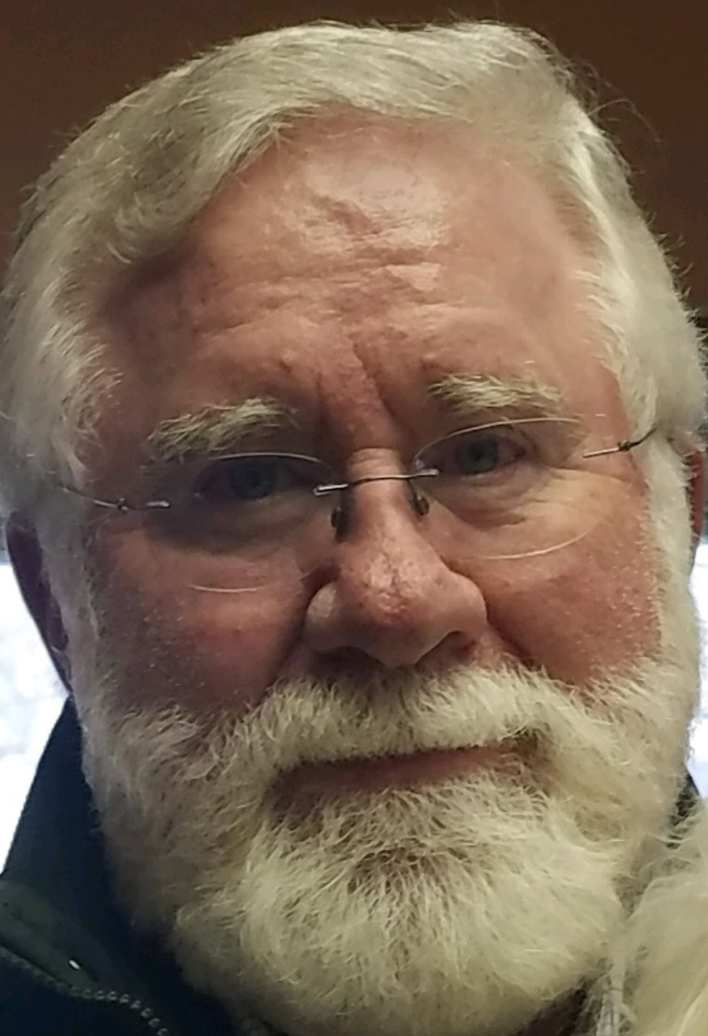
- Occupations: Small business consultant and media personality

Jim Blasingame is a former American small business consultant and media personality.

== Career ==
Blasingame's consulting firm supported small business CEOs. In 1997, he established Small Business Network, Inc. (SBN). He published a series of books between 2002 and 2018 and contributed to BizJournals.com and Forbes.com, among other publications.

Blasingame ceased contributing to his blog in December 2023, has not contributed to his Twitter and Facebook accounts since February 2021, and published his last The Small Business Advocate radio shows in May 2021.

== Awards and recognition ==
- 2018 Axiom Business Book Award Gold Medal for his fourth book, The 3rd Ingredient: The Journey of Analog Ethics into the World of Digital Fear and Greed
- 2018 International Book Awards for The 3rd Ingredient: The Journey of Analog Ethics into the World of Digital Fear and Greed
- 2014 Independent Book Publisher Award (IPPY) for his third book, The Age of the Customer: Prepare for the Moment of Relevance
- 2014 Axiom Business Book Awards, for The Age of the Customer: Prepare for the Moment of Relevance
- 2009 Champion of the Chamber Movement, American Chamber of Commerce Executives (ACCE)
- 2009 Champion of Small Business Development Award, Association of Small Business Development Centers
- 2009 Small Business Advocate of the Year, New York Enterprise Report
- 2006 University of North Alabama Alumnus of the Year
- April 2005 Small Business & Entrepreneurship Council Small Business Advocate of the Month
- 2002 Small Business Journalist of the Year, by the U.S. Small Business Administration
- 2000 One of the 30 most influential small business experts, by FORTUNE Small Business magazine

== Publications ==
- Blasingame, Jim (2018) The 3rd Ingredient: The Journey of Analog Ethics into the World of Digital Fear and Greed. Alabama: SBN Books. p 314. ISBN 978-0-9709278-5-9
- Blasingame, Jim (2014). The Age of the Customer®: Prepare for the Moment of Relevance. Alabama: SBN Books. p. 209. ISBN 978-09709278-2-8.
- Blasingame, Jim (2006). Three Minutes to Success. Alabama: SBN Books. pp. 119. ISBN 978-0-9709278-1-1.
- Blasingame, Jim (2002). Small Business Is Like a Bunch of Bananas: You Have to Remove the Peels to Get to the Good Stuff. Alabama: SBN Books. pp. 122. ISBN 978-0-9709278-0-4.
