= Donald B. Dodd =

American historian

Donald B. Dodd is an American academic and professor emeritus of history at Auburn University at Montgomery.

Dodd earned a bachelor's degree from the University of North Alabama and a master's degree from Auburn University. He holds a Ph.D from the University of Georgia.

Following his retirement from Auburn University at Montgomery in 1995, Dodd became the administrator of the Southern Museum of Flight in Birmingham, Alabama.

Dodd is the author of several books on Alabama history, including:

- Winston (Jasper: Annals of Northwest Alabama, 1972)
- Historical Statistics of the South (Univ. of Alabama Press, 1973)
- Historical Atlas of Alabama (Univ. of Alabama Press, 1974)
- Historical Statistics of the United States, (Westport, Conn., 1993)
- Alabama Now & Then (The Advertiser Company, 1994)
- Alabama History:An Annotated Bibliography, (Westport, Conn., 1998)
- Deep South Aviation (Arcadia Publishing, 1999)
- The Free State of Winston (Arcadia Publishing, 2000)
- Wings of Denial:The Role of the Alabama National Guard in the Bay of Pigs (The New South, 2001)
