= Steve Trash =

American magician

- Born: Stephen B.Richerson; San Angelo, Texas
- Education: University of North Alabama
- Notable work: green magic set, PBS TV Show

Comedy career
- Years active: 1984–present
- Medium: Live
- Genre: Magic (illusion)
- Website: www.stevetrash.com

Steve Trash is an American magician. He was born in San Angelo, Texas.

== Early life and education ==
Steve Trash was born in San Angelo Texas. The son of a forester and a teacher, Trash was raised in various places across Alabama, including Bay Minette, Montgomery and Florence.

Trash graduated from the University of North Alabama with a degree in theater. He then moved to New York City. Trash also attended Stella Adler Studio of Acting in New York City and Second City in Los Angeles, CA.

== Career ==
Trash performs internationally at theaters, fairs and festivals. He created the world's first eco-friendly green magic set which is a little magic kit that can be used by children or adults. The magic kit is made of renewable bamboo and rubber tree wood, making it environmentally friendly. In 2013, Steve Trash and Kelvin Holly released an album called The Trash Tunes. He has recently created The Recycle Cycle which is a mobile recycling edu-station. He created this to promote and help children to understand the importance of keeping the Earth clean and litter free.

Trash has entertained millions of kids around the world with his unique brand of eco-magic. In June 2019, in partnership with Alabama Public Television, Trash produced a science show for kids, "distributed by NETA (National Educational Telecommunications Association) to PBS stations across the US and ... available on Apple TV, Roku, Chromecast, YouTube and the PBS app." Science topics include ecosystems, food chains, soils and water cycles, weather and climate, the Solar System, solar energy and more.

Trash is a lifetime member of the Alabama Association for Environmental Education and he also has appeared on AGT in 2001. is also a founding board member of Keep the Shoals Beautiful.

== Awards ==
Trash was given the Environmental Educator of the Year Award by EEAA. His Trash and Recycle Show won the statewide Outstanding Project Award presented by RC&D in the year 2007. His video “Kids Making Better Choices” won the award in 2009 as well. His Green Magic Set won an American Specialty Retailers Association Award in 2009.
