= Dan Tyler Moore =

U.S. Army officer (1877–1941)

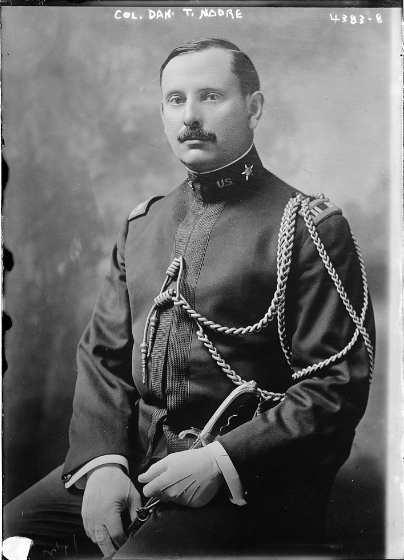
- Colonel Dan Tyler Moore, photographed in 1917.
- Born: February 9, 1877; Montgomery, Alabama, U.S.
- Died: April 15, 1941 (aged 64) Houston, Texas, U.S.
- Buried: Fort Sam Houston, Texas, U.S.
- Allegiance: United States of America
- Service years: 1899–1941
- Rank: Lieutenant Colonel
- Education: ETH Zurich
- Spouses: Luvie Jones Butler (1906-1915; her death), Maria Christina Crespi (1916-1941, his death)
- Children: Dan Tyler Moore Jr., Luvie Moore Abell, Mary Tyler Moore and Christina Moore

Dan Tyler Moore (February 9, 1877 – April 15, 1941) was a career U.S. Army officer and an aide to President Theodore Roosevelt. He was also a cousin of the First Lady, Edith Roosevelt. An avid amateur boxer, and a sparring partner for Roosevelt, he struck the President in the eye, causing him to lose much of the sight of that eye.

== Early life ==
Daniel Tyler Moore was born in Montgomery, Alabama, on February 9, 1877, to Mary L. Moore, née Tyler and U.S. Army Captain Alexander Moore. He was named after his maternal grandfather, Brigadier General Daniel Tyler, and he was also the great-great-nephew of Vice President Aaron Burr. He grew up in Hanover, Germany, and was educated in Switzerland. In 1898, he graduated from the Eidgenössische Polytechnische Schule in Zurich, two classes ahead of Albert Einstein.

Moore returned to the United States just before the Spanish–American War and was commissioned in the 15th Infantry. He served in Cuba from 1899 until 1901, then transferred to the artillery and served in the Philippines from 1902 until 1904. In 1904, he was made a military aide to President Roosevelt. While serving in that capacity, he served as a sparring partner for Roosevelt, who was an enthusiastic amateur boxer. While boxing with the President, Moore struck Roosevelt so hard in the eye that the President lost sight in it. Moore did not learn of the result of the blow until 1917, and only from reading Roosevelt's statement of how he came to lose sight in that eye, in which Roosevelt did not name Moore, but Moore realized that only he fit the description. Moore stated, "But could you ask for any better proof of the man's sportsmanship than the fact that he never told me what I had done to him?"

== Military pioneer ==
In 1907, the Artillery was divided, with separate divisions to deal with field artillery, and shore artillery. Moore remained with the "Redlegs", as the field artillery was known. At the time, only Germany had a workable system of indirect fire (how guns may be trained on a target that cannot be seen). Roosevelt wrote to Kaiser Wilhelm II, calling Moore "my young cousin" and secured his admission to the German artillery school, the first foreigner to attend. Moore spent much of 1909 and 1910 at the school, and was careful to appear to be a lazy but amiable officer, while soaking up all the knowledge he could. He returned to the United States in April 1910, prolonging his stay in Europe for six weeks so he would qualify as a non-resident for customs fees.

Following his return to the United States, in 1911, Captain Moore was sent to Fort Sill, Oklahoma, where he was to found the U.S. Army School of Fire (today the Field Artillery School). He was given complete authority to design the training of Army privates, non-commissioned officers, and officers at the school, which was initially run on a shoestring. He remained at the school until late 1914. He was then sent to Washington, where he joined the staff of the Army War College. His houseguest there was Franz von Papen, later Chancellor of Germany during the Weimar Republic (and Vice Chancellor briefly under Hitler)—von Papen had been Moore's roommate in Germany. Unbeknownst to Moore, von Papen was running a spy ring out of Moore's house, for which the German was later expelled from the United States.

In World War I, Moore, by now a Lieutenant Colonel, commanded a field artillery brigade. Upon his return to the United States in 1919, he resigned from active duty, though he maintained a reserve commission until his death on April 15, 1941.

== Personal life ==
In 1906 Moore married Luvie Jones Butler. After Butler's death in 1915, Moore married Maria Christina Crespi the following year. His children include author Dan Tyler Moore Jr., and four daughters, including Luvie Moore Abell, wife of The Washington Post columnist Drew Pearson. He is buried in the National Cemetery at Fort Sam Houston, Texas.
