= Addison, Alabama =

- Town
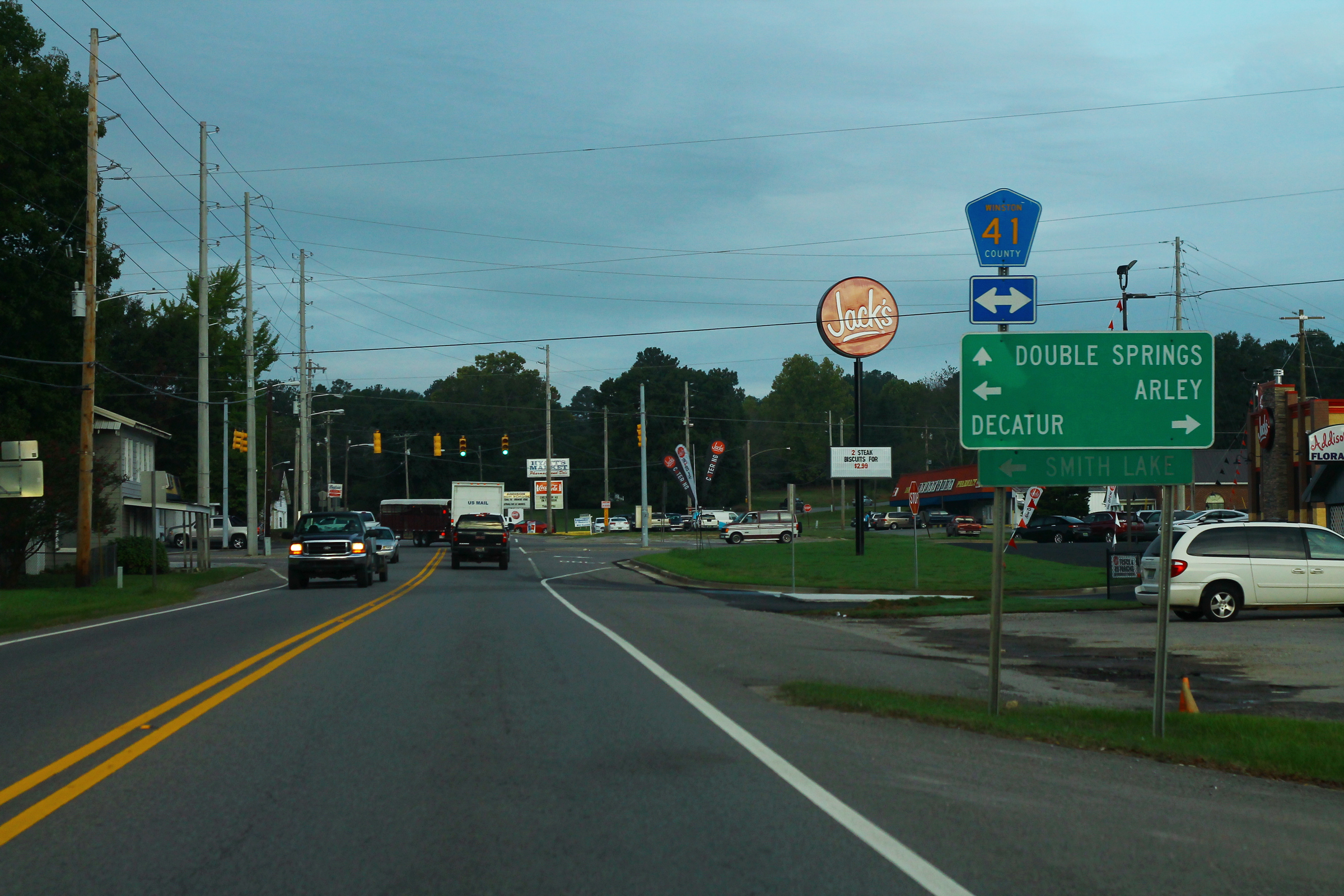
- US 278 at CR 41 in Addison (2018)

- Location within Winston County and Alabama
- Coordinates: 34°12′06″N 87°10′36″W
- Country: United States
- State: Alabama
- County: Winston

Government
  - Type: Mayor-Council
  - Mayor: Marsha Pigg

Area
  - Total: 3.80 sq mi (9.84 km^{2})
  - Land: 3.76 sq mi (9.75 km^{2})
  - Water: 0.031 sq mi (0.08 km^{2})
- Elevation: 774 ft (236 m)

Population (2020)
  - Total: 659
  - Density: 175/sq mi (67.6/km^{2})
- Time zone: UTC-6 (Central (CST))
  - Summer (DST): UTC-5 (CDT)
- ZIP code: 35540
- Area code: 256
- FIPS code: 01-00484
- GNIS feature ID: 2405123
- Website: town-of-addison.com

Addison is a town in Winston County, Alabama, United States. At the 2020 census, it had a population of 659, down from 758 in 2010.

== History ==
Addison was incorporated in December 1949.

== Geography ==
According to the U.S. Census Bureau, the town has a total area of 3.5 square miles (9.1 km^{2}), all land.

=== Climate ===
Climate data for Addison, Alabama, 1991–2020 normals, extremes 2001–present
Month	Jan	Feb	Mar	Apr	May	Jun	Jul	Aug	Sep	Oct	Nov	Dec	Year
Record high °F (°C)	75 (24)	76 (24)	86 (30)	89 (32)	92 (33)	104 (40)	103 (39)	101 (38)	97 (36)	98 (37)	87 (31)	76 (24)	104 (40)
Mean daily maximum °F (°C)	50.4 (10.2)	54.5 (12.5)	63.5 (17.5)	71.9 (22.2)	78.8 (26.0)	84.8 (29.3)	88.0 (31.1)	87.8 (31.0)	83.1 (28.4)	73.3 (22.9)	62.0 (16.7)	53.0 (11.7)	70.9 (21.6)
Daily mean °F (°C)	39.9 (4.4)	43.3 (6.3)	51.6 (10.9)	59.3 (15.2)	67.3 (19.6)	74.2 (23.4)	77.8 (25.4)	76.8 (24.9)	71.5 (21.9)	60.8 (16.0)	50.3 (10.2)	42.8 (6.0)	59.6 (15.4)
Mean daily minimum °F (°C)	29.4 (−1.4)	32.2 (0.1)	39.7 (4.3)	46.7 (8.2)	55.8 (13.2)	63.6 (17.6)	67.6 (19.8)	65.8 (18.8)	59.9 (15.5)	48.3 (9.1)	38.7 (3.7)	32.7 (0.4)	48.4 (9.1)
Record low °F (°C)	−2 (−19)	3 (−16)	9 (−13)	28 (−2)	33 (1)	46 (8)	51 (11)	47 (8)	40 (4)	26 (−3)	16 (−9)	4 (−16)	−2 (−19)
Average precipitation inches (mm)	5.37 (136)	5.61 (142)	5.44 (138)	5.85 (149)	5.09 (129)	4.75 (121)	4.78 (121)	4.37 (111)	4.45 (113)	3.91 (99)	4.85 (123)	6.31 (160)	60.78 (1,542)
Average snowfall inches (cm)	0.2 (0.51)	0.0 (0.0)	0.0 (0.0)	0.0 (0.0)	0.0 (0.0)	0.0 (0.0)	0.0 (0.0)	0.0 (0.0)	0.0 (0.0)	0.0 (0.0)	0.0 (0.0)	0.0 (0.0)	0.2 (0.51)
Average precipitation days (≥ 0.01 in)	9.9	10.0	10.7	8.8	8.3	10.5	10.4	8.8	6.2	6.5	7.9	10.0	108.0
Average snowy days (≥ 0.1 in)	0.4	0.3	0.0	0.0	0.0	0.0	0.0	0.0	0.0	0.0	0.0	0.0	0.7
Source 1: NWS
Source 2: NOAA

== Demographics ==
Historical population
Census	Pop.	Note	%±
1950	590		—
1960	343		−41.9%
1970	692		101.7%
1980	746		7.8%
1990	626		−16.1%
2000	723		15.5%
2010	758		4.8%
2020	659		−13.1%
U.S. Decennial Census

Addison first appeared as an incorporated town on the 1950 U.S. Census. It was also the same name as its precinct/census division, which preceded it in reporting on the census since 1910 (See Addison Precinct below).

As of the 2010 Census Addison had a population of 757. The population was 99.1% white, 0.1% black or African American, 0.1% Asian, 0.7% from two or more races and 0.4% Hispanic or Latino of any race.

As of the census of 2000, there were 723 people, 315 households, and 219 families residing in the town. The population density was 205.7 inhabitants per square mile (79.4/km^{2}). There were 339 housing units at an average density of 96.5 per square mile (37.3/km^{2}). The racial makeup of the town was 99.45% White, 0.14% Black or African American, 0.14% Native American, 0.14% Asian, and 0.14% from two or more races. 0.14% of the population were Hispanic or Latino of any race.

There were 315 households, out of which 30.2% had children under the age of 18 living with them, 54.0% were married couples living together, 12.1% had a female householder with no husband present, and 30.2% were non-families. 28.6% of all households were made up of individuals, and 13.0% had someone living alone who was 65 years of age or older. The average household size was 2.30 and the average family size was 2.78.

In the town, the population was spread out, with 22.1% under the age of 18, 8.4% from 18 to 24, 30.2% from 25 to 44, 24.9% from 45 to 64, and 14.4% who were 65 years of age or older. The median age was 38 years. For every 100 females, there were 93.3 males. For every 100 females age 18 and over, there were 84.0 males.

The median income for a household in the town was $22,235, and the median income for a family was $31,146. Males had a median income of $26,667 versus $19,583 for females. The per capita income for the town was $12,973. About 16.3% of families and 19.7% of the population were below the poverty line, including 31.1% of those under age 18 and 19.5% of those age 65 or over.

Addison's major industry has been the mobile home industry since the 1960s. It is the home of Cavalier Homes and Southern Energy. More people work in Addison than live in the community.

=== Addison Precinct/Division (1910-) ===
Historical population
Census	Pop.	Note	%±
1910	1,739		—
1920	1,528		−12.1%
1930	1,622		6.2%
1940	1,965		21.1%
1950	1,730		−12.0%
1960	3,854		122.8%
1970	4,585		19.0%
1980	5,744		25.3%
1990	6,337		10.3%
2000	7,510		18.5%
2010	7,884		5.0%
2020	659		−91.6%
U.S. Decennial Census

Addison Census Division, the former 7th precinct of Winston County, first appeared on the 1910 U.S. Census. The prior precinct/beat name from 1870 to 1900 (none reported in 1880) was Looney's Tavern. In 1960, Addison precinct was changed to census division as part of a general reorganization of counties.

== Education ==
=== Addison High School ===
Addison is home to Addison High School, a member of the Winston County School System. The athletic teams of the school are nicknamed the Bulldogs. Addison had the most successful sports program in class 1-A in 2005 winning state championships in football and volleyball.

The school has had a competitive football team since coach A.G. Hicks came to Addison in the mid-1950s starting a tradition of teams known for great defense. In 1970 Addison won the state championship, going 13–0, and allowing only one touchdown to be scored against its defense. In 1976 the Bulldogs won their second state football championship under head coach Allen Stephenson. Randy White led the Bulldogs to a third championship in 2005.

The volleyball program, under coach Pam Wilkins, won three straight state championships from 2003 to 2005, and was undefeated in 2005. The varsity girls' volleyball program won a 2A state championship in 2009, after being 2A runner-up in 2008. They also won the state volleyball championship for 1A for 2010. The girls won another state championship under Pam Wilkins in 2013. The girls' softball program, led by coach Debbie Thompson, won a state championship in 1996.

== Notable people ==
- Kip Box, bishop in the Church of God (Cleveland, Tennessee)
- Pat Buttram, movie and television actor, born in Addison

== Photo Gallery ==
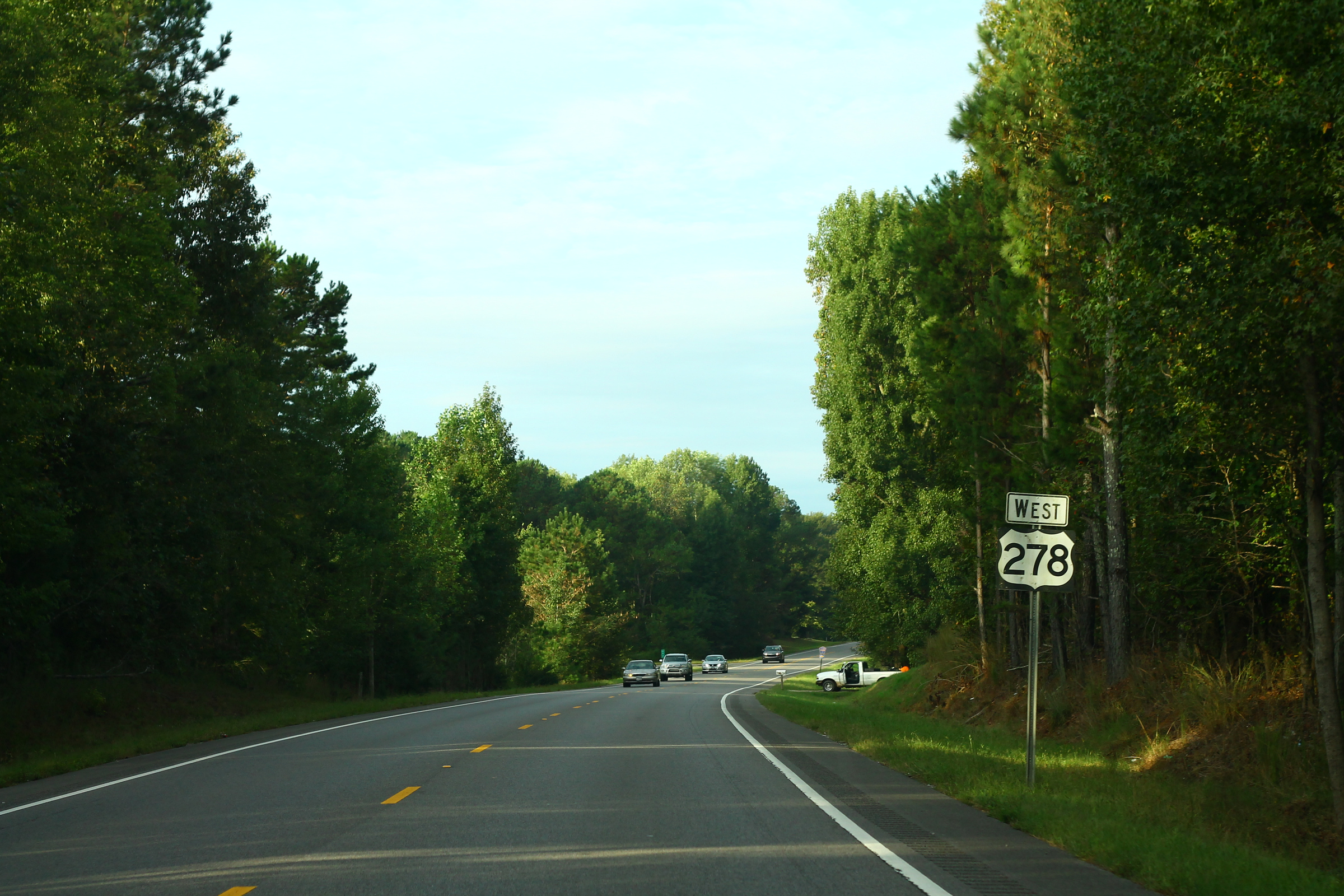
US 278 West near Addison

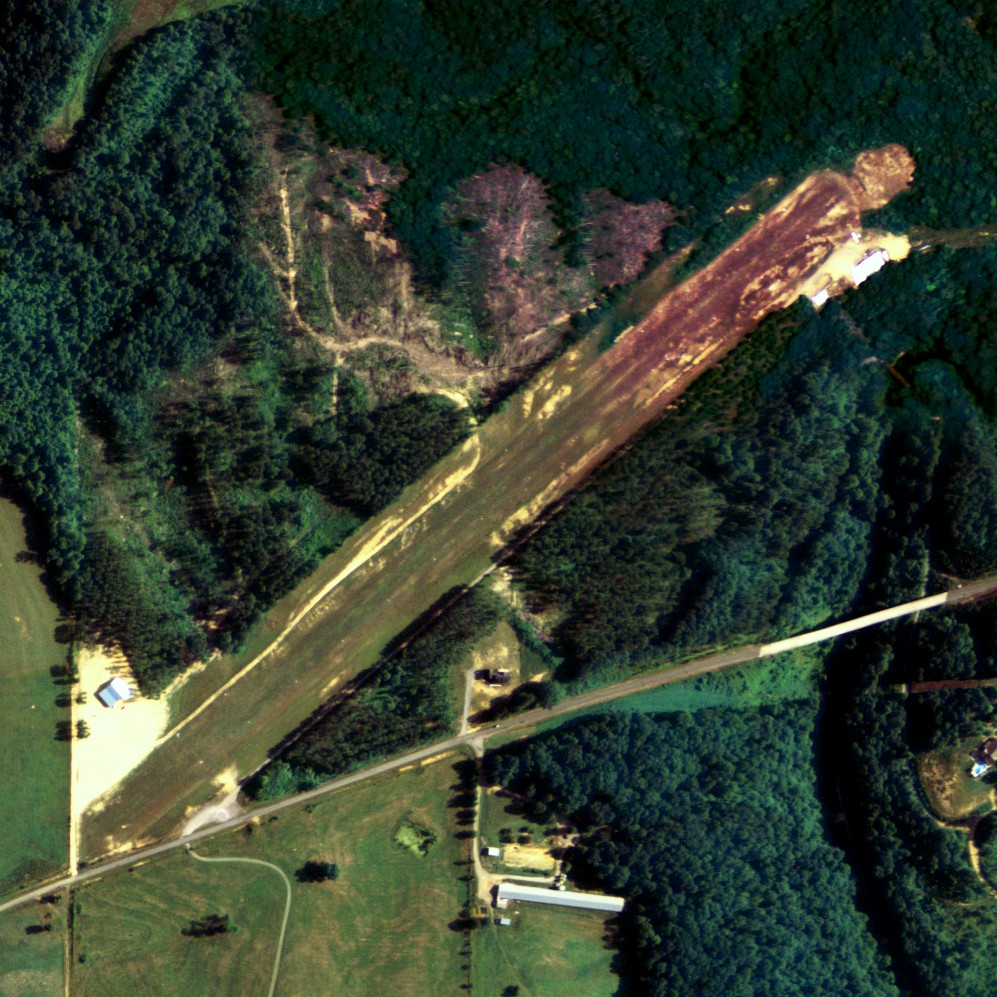
Aerial view of Addison Municipal Airport, 2006
