= Fortune Small Business =

Defunct American magazine

- Frequency: 10 times per year
- Total circulation: 1 million
- First issue: 1991
- Final issue: 2009
- Company: Fortune Media Group Holdings

Fortune Small Business (FSB) was an American magazine published 10 times per year from 1991 to 2009. It was a joint venture by The Fortune Group at Time Inc. and the American Express Small Business Services. It was delivered to 1 million small business owners across the United States.

== History ==
Fortune Small Business was headquartered in New York City. It was sub-published under Fortune by Fortune Media Group Holdings, owned by the Thai businessman Chatchaval Jiaravanon. Although it was connected to Fortune, it was a joint venture by them at Time Inc. and American Express. FSB was initially established in 1991 as Your Company. It was renamed in the November 1999 issue at the managing editor's request according to Hank Gilman. It explored how small business owners run their companies, the technologies they use and where they spend time out of the office. FSB published lists which highlighted the companies, trends and entrepreneurs that would make headlines in the year ahead. In 2007, there was approximately a 30% decrease in revenues. The magazine's failure to move to digital formats as print media became less popular, and a lack of advertising, contributed to this decline. The magazine began downsizing in 2008, and was discontinued in 2009.

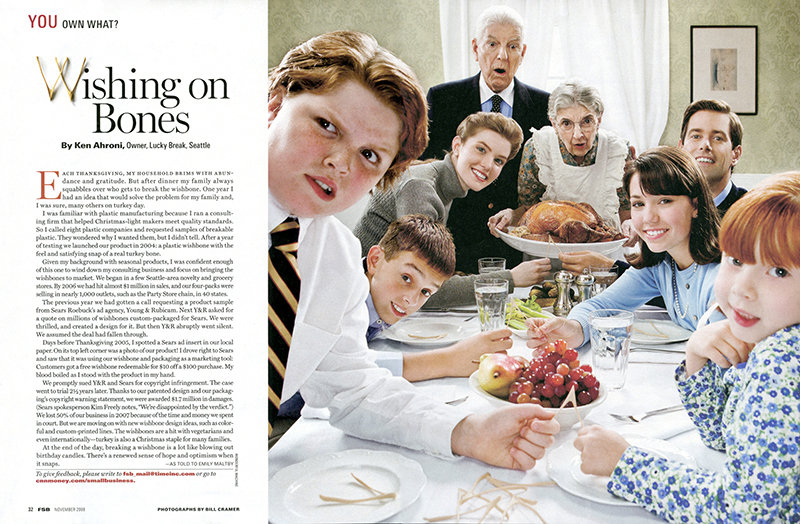
Article on synthetic wishbones for November 2008 issue of FSB

== Content and format ==
Fortune Small Business was a limited publication between 2004 and 2009. During this time, the content included a section called "Features" which was tailored towards culture, innovation and the economy. In its early years, features included developments in health, infrastructure, technology and leadership. Another section of the publication was "Start-Up" which was dedicated to innovative small businesses. Early reports within FSB included "Intuit", which described the CEO's position on leadership and developing software that helps small businesses to gather data for payroll and taxes.
