= Danny B. Moore =

American academic

Danny B. Moore is an American academic who served as provost and vice president of academic affairs at Chowan University.

In addition to his administrative duties, Moore also served as a professor of history, taught courses in Discovering America, The Gilded Age, Sports in America, Women in American History, and Introduction to Public History. He has authored publications in the area of southern agricultural history. Moore joined the Chowan University faculty as an assistant professor of history in 1994.

Moore holds a B.S. in history from the University of North Alabama, a M.A. in history from the University of Akron and a Ph.D. in history from Mississippi State University.

The Chowan University student body honored Moore as Alpha Chi Teacher of the Year in 2000.

He served as president of the North Carolina Association of Historians from 2004 and 2005.
