= Hillard =

Hillard may refer to:

Surname:

- Carole Hillard (1936–2007), the first woman to serve as Lieutenant Governor of South Dakota
- Charlie Hillard (1938–1996), American aerobatics pilot, the first American to win the world aerobatics title
- Donora Hillard (born 1982), American educator and author
- Doug Hillard (1935–1997), English professional footballer
- George Stillman Hillard (1808–1879), American lawyer and author
- Major M. Hillard (1896–1977), Virginia politician and judge from Chesapeake, Virginia
- Merris Hillard (born 1949), Australian printmaker and photographer
- Norm Hillard (1915–1986), Australian rules footballer
- Robert E. Hillard (1917–2000), co-established Fleishman-Hillard in St. Louis, Missouri in 1946
- Steve Hillard, private equity entrepreneur, attorney, author, and television producer

Given name:

- Hillard Elkins (1929–2010), American theatre and film producer
- Hillard Bell Huntington (1910–1992), physicist who first proposed, in 1935, that hydrogen could occur in a metallic state
- Brewster Hillard Morris (1909–1990), American diplomat

Other:

- Hillard Homes, residential high-rise development in the near South Side of Chicago, Illinois
- Hillard Limestone, geologic formation in Alaska

== See also ==
- Fleishman-Hillard International Communications, public relations and marketing agency in St. Louis, Missouri
- Hillards
- Hillared
- Hilliard (disambiguation)
- Hilliardia
- Hilliards (disambiguation)
- Hillyard (disambiguation)
