= Hilliard =

Hilliard may refer to:

== Places ==
=== Canada ===
- Hilliard, Ontario
- Hilliard, Alberta

=== United States ===
- Hilliard, Florida
- Hilliard, Missouri
- Hilliard, Ohio

== Other uses ==
- Hilliard (name)
- The Hilliard Ensemble, named after Nicholas Hilliard
- Hilliard Mills, historic mill site in Manchester, Connecticut
- Hilliard Peak, a mountain in Colorado

== See also ==
- Hilliards (disambiguation)
