= Hilliard (name) =

Hilliard is both a surname and a given name. Notable people with the name include:

== Surname ==
- Asa Grant Hilliard III (1933–2007), African American professor of educational psychology
- Benjamin Hilliard (1868–1951), U.S. Representative from Colorado
- Bob Hilliard (1918–1971), American lyricist
- Brent Hilliard (born 1970), American volleyball player
- Colm Hilliard (1936–2002), Irish Fianna Fáil Party politician
- Corey Hilliard (born 1985), American football offensive tackle
- Dalton Hilliard (born 1964), former American football player
- Daniel Hilliard (died 1888), Ontario merchant and political figure
- Darrun Hilliard (born 1993), American basketball player for Maccabi Tel Aviv
- David Hilliard (1942-), Chief of Staff of the Black Panther Party
- David Hilliard (photographer) (born 1964), American photographer
- Dontrell Hilliard (born 1995), American football player
- Earl Hilliard Sr. (born 1942), American politician and former congressman from Alabama
- Earl Hilliard Jr. (born 1969), American politician from Alabama
- Edward Hilliard (MP) (c. 1754–1815), English barrister and Member of Parliament
- Edward Hilliard (1851–1936, American Seventh-day Adventist missionary
- Ernest Hilliard (1890–1947), American actor
- George Hilliard (1827–1892), Canadian businessman and politician
- Harry Hilliard (cricketer) (1826–1914), Australian cricketer
- Henry Washington Hilliard (1808–1892), U.S. Representative from Alabama
- Ike Hilliard (born 1976), professional American football player, nephew of Dalton Hilliard
- Irwin Foster Hilliard (1863–1948), Ontario lawyer and political figure
- Isaac H. Hilliard (1811–1868), American planter and cotton factor in the Antebellum South
- Jacqueline Hilliard, married name of Jacqueline Dalya
- John Hilliard (artist) (born 1945), London-based conceptual artist, photographer and academic
- John Kenneth Hilliard (1901–1989), American acoustic and electrical engineer, loudspeaker designer
- John Northern Hilliard (1872–1935), American author of a best-selling book on magic
- John S. Hilliard (1947–2019), American composer
- John Hilliard (Alabama politician) (born 1961), American politician from Alabama
- Justin Hilliard (born 1998), American football player
- Lawrence Hilliard (1582–1640), English miniature painter (son of Nicholas Hilliard)
- Lex Hilliard (born 1984), American football running back
- Mary Ann Hilliard (1860–1950), Irish nurse and suffragette
- Michael Hilliard (1903–1982), Irish politician
- Nicholas Hilliard (1537–1619), English miniature painter (father of Lawrence Hilliard)
- Nicholas Hilliard (judge) (born 1959), British judge
- Olive Mary Hilliard (1925–2022), South African botanist and taxonomist
- Patsy Jo Hilliard (born 1937), American educator and former mayor of East Point, Georgia
- Randy Hilliard (born 1967), American football defensive back
- Robert Hilliard (1904–1937), Irish republican, boxer, and communist
- Sam Hilliard (born 1994), American baseball player
- William A. Hilliard (1927–2017), American journalist

== Given name ==
- Hilliard Brooke Bell (1897–1960), Canadian World War I flying ace
- Hilliard Beyerstein (1907–1990), Canadian politician
- Hilliard Gates (1915–1996), American radio sports announcer
- Hilliard P. Jenkins (1922–1992), American farmer, philanthropist, and civic leader
- Hilliard Lyle (1879–1931), Canadian lacrosse player
- Hilliard Mitchell (1852–1923), Canadian politician
- Hilliard A. Wilbanks (1933–1967), United States Air Force officer and Medal of Honor recipient
