= Wilby =

Wilby may refer to:

== Places ==
- Wilby, Norfolk, England
- Wilby, Northamptonshire, England
- Wilby, Suffolk, England
- Wilby, Victoria, Australia
- Wilby, Missouri, United States

== Surname ==
- James Wilby (born 1958), actor
- Jane Wilby, pseudonym of Anne Hampson (1928–2014), author
- Jennifer Wilby (born 1953), management scientist
- Peter Wilby (born 1944), UK journalist
- Philip Wilby (born 1949), composer

== Fictional ==
Places

- Wilby, a small Maritime island town where the film Wilby Wonderful takes place

People

- Wilby Xaba in the 1975 film The Wilby Conspiracy
- Wilby Daniels in the 1959 film The Shaggy Dog
