= Powers Creek =

Stream in the US state of Missouri

Powers Creek is a stream in northeast Butler County in the U.S. state of Missouri. It is a tributary of the Black River.

The stream headwaters arise at 36°54′42″N 90°25′37″W and it flows to the southwest to its confluence with the Black River at 36°53′00″N 90°27′07″W southeast of Hendrickson and north of the community of Wilby after crossing under Missouri Route O and the Missouri Pacific Railway.

Powers Creek was named after George Powers, an early settler.

== See also ==
- List of rivers of Missouri
