= Hilliard Peak =

Mountain in the state of Colorado

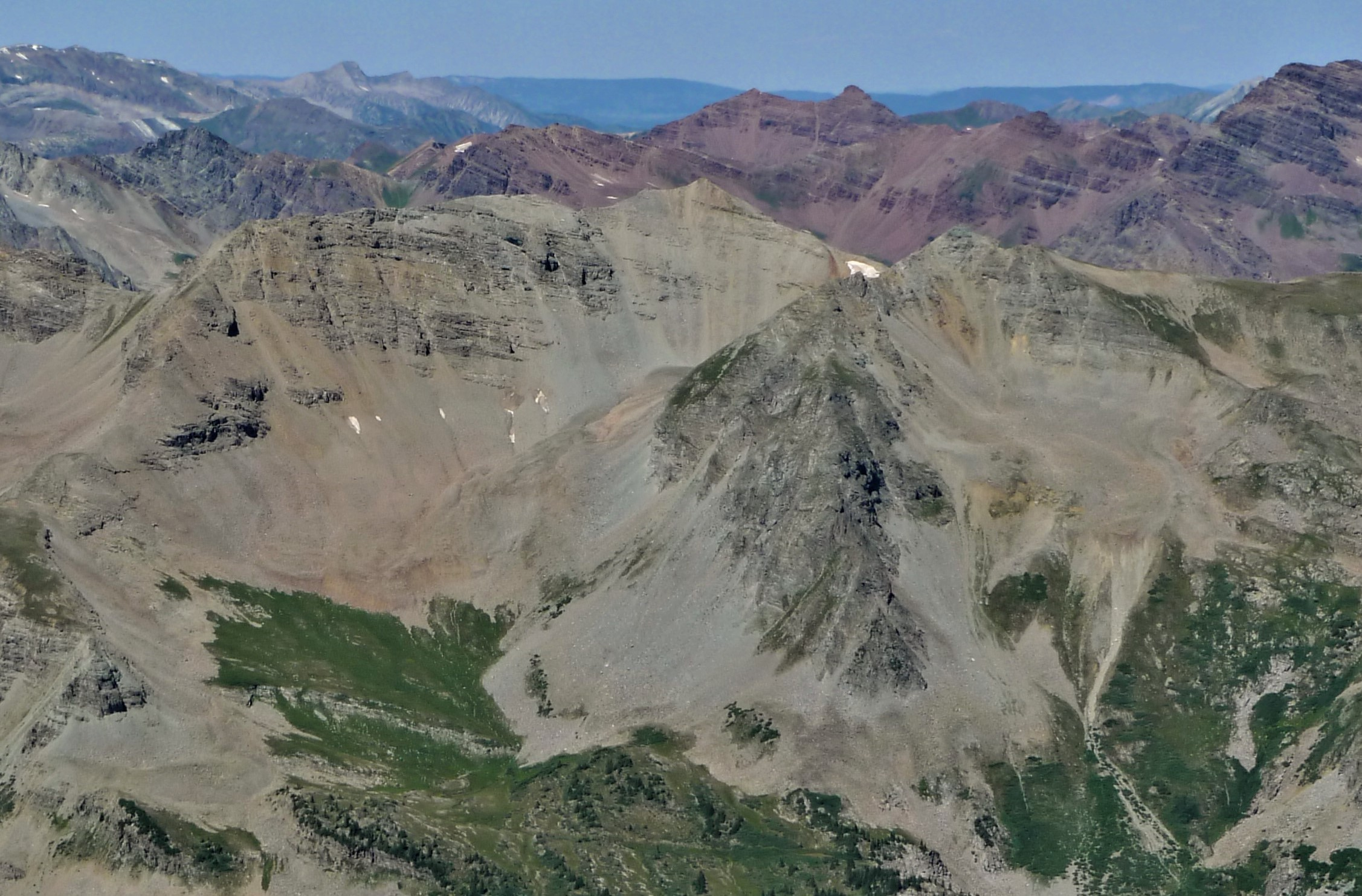
- East aspect, centered, from Castle Peak

Highest point
- Elevation: 13,422 ft (4,091 m)
- Prominence: 311 ft (95 m)
- Parent peak: Keefe Peak (13,532 ft)
- Isolation: 0.65 mi (1.05 km)
- Coordinates: 39°01′27″N 106°54′35″W

Naming
- Etymology: Edward Hobbs Hilliard, Jr.

Geography
- Location within Colorado Location within the United States
- Country: United States
- State: Colorado
- County: Pitkin County
- Protected area: Maroon Bells–Snowmass Wilderness
- Parent range: Rocky Mountains; Elk Mountains
- Topo map: USGS Maroon Bells

Climbing
- Easiest route: class 2+

Hilliard Peak is a 13,422-foot (4,091 m) mountain summit in Pitkin County, Colorado, United States.

== Description ==
Hilliard Peak is located 17 miles (27 km) west of the Continental Divide in the Elk Mountains which are a subrange of the Rocky Mountains. It ranks as the 306th-highest peak in Colorado. The mountain is situated 12 miles (19 km) south-southwest of the community of Aspen and 2.8 miles (4.5 km) west-northwest of Castle Peak. The peak is set in the Maroon Bells–Snowmass Wilderness on land managed by White River National Forest. Precipitation runoff from the mountain's slopes drains into tributaries of the Roaring Fork River which is a tributary of the Colorado River. Topographic relief is significant as the summit rises 2,800 feet (853 m) above Conundrum Creek in 1.3 miles (2.1 km) and 2,400 feet (732 m) above East Maroon Creek in 1.2 miles (1.9 km).

== Etymology ==
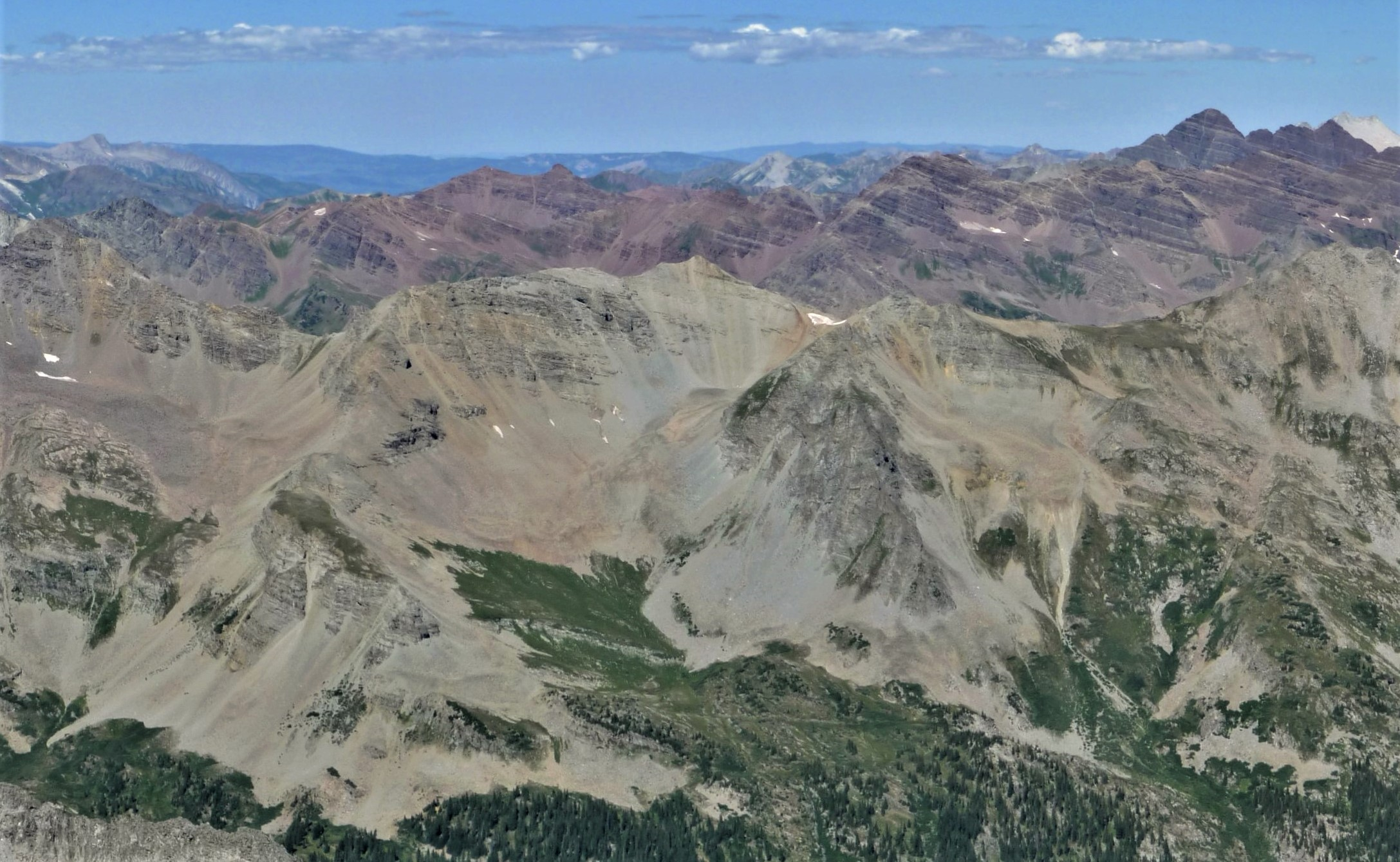
Hilliard Peak centered and North Maroon Peak in upper right corner of frame.

The mountain's toponym was officially adopted on December 9, 1975, by the United States Board on Geographic Names to commemorate Edward H. Hilliard, Jr. (1922–1970), conservationist and environmentalist. He was born in Louisville, Kentucky, on October 16, 1922. He served as an Infantry Lieutenant in France during World War II, then completed his college education at Yale University in 1948, then moved to Colorado in 1949. Hilliard died on August 15, 1970, when he and a climbing companion were killed by a rockfall near the summit of North Maroon Peak.

== Climate ==
According to the Köppen climate classification system, Hilliard Peak is located in an alpine subarctic climate zone with cold, snowy winters, and cool to warm summers. Due to its altitude, it receives precipitation all year, as snow in winter, and as thunderstorms in summer, with a dry period in late spring.

== See also ==
- Mountains of Pitkin County, Colorado
- Thirteener
