= Hilliardiella =

Scientific classification
- Kingdom: Plantae
- Clade: Tracheophytes
- Clade: Angiosperms
- Clade: Eudicots
- Clade: Asterids
- Order: Asterales
- Family: Asteraceae
- Subfamily: Cichorioideae
- Tribe: Vernonieae
- Genus: Hilliardiella; H.Rob.

Synonyms
- Webbia DC.

Genus of flowering plants

Hilliardiella is a genus of flowering plants belonging to the family Asteraceae.

Its native range is Tropical and southern Africa. It is found in the countries of Angola, Botswana, Burkina, Burundi, Cameroon, Central African Republic, Congo, DRC, Eswatini, Ethiopia, Gabon, Ghana, Guinea, Ivory Coast, Kenya, Lesotho, Malawi, Mali, Mozambique, Namibia, Nigeria, Rwanda, Sudan, Tanzania, Zambia, Zimbabwe and South Africa (within the regions of Cape Provinces, Free State, KwaZulu-Natal and Northern Provinces).

The genus name of Hilliardiella is in honour of Olive Mary Hilliard (b. 1925), a noted South African botanist and taxonomist. It was first described and published in Proc. Biol. Soc. Washington Vol.112 on page 229 in 1999.

== Species ==
According to Kew:

- Hilliardiella aristata (DC.) H.Rob.
- Hilliardiella calyculata (S.Moore) H.Rob.
- Hilliardiella capensis (Houtt.) H.Rob., Skvarla & V.A.Funk
- Hilliardiella elaeagnoides (DC.) Swelank. & J.C.Manning
- Hilliardiella flanaganii (E.Phillips) H.Rob., Skvarla & V.A.Funk
- Hilliardiella hirsuta (DC.) H.Rob.
- Hilliardiella nudicaulis (DC.) H.Rob.
- Hilliardiella oligocephala (DC.) H.Rob.
- Hilliardiella smithiana (Less.) H.Rob.
- Hilliardiella sutherlandii (Harv.) H.Rob.
