= Hendrickson, Missouri =

- Unincorporated community
- Location within Missouri Location within the United States
- Coordinates: 36°54′16″N 90°28′08″W
- Country: United States
- State: Missouri
- County: Butler
- Elevation: 364 ft (111 m)
- Time zone: UTC-6 (Central (CST))
  - Summer (DST): UTC-5 (CDT)
- Area code: 573
- GNIS feature ID: 750291

Hendrickson is an unincorporated community in northern Butler County, Missouri, United States.

== History ==
Hendrickson was laid out in 1873 when the railroad was extended to that point, and named after Nathan Henrickson, the original owner of the town site. A post office called Hendrickson was established in 1875 and remained in operation until 1975.

KAIT, an Arkansas-based television station, can be picked up as far north as Hendrickson.

On May 1, 2010, an EF0 tornado hit Hendrickson, downing several large trees. On May 30, 1917, an F3 tornado struck the community.

== Geography ==
Hendrickson is located along Missouri Route O approximately one mile south of U.S. Route 67. It is approximately ten miles north of Poplar Bluff, within the Mark Twain National Forest. The community of Wilby lies three miles to the southeast along Route O. It sits on the east margin of the Black River floodplain. The Missouri Pacific Railway passes the community's west side along the Black River floodplain. It is also on U.S. Route 60.
