= Mill conversion =

Adaptive reuse of mill buildings

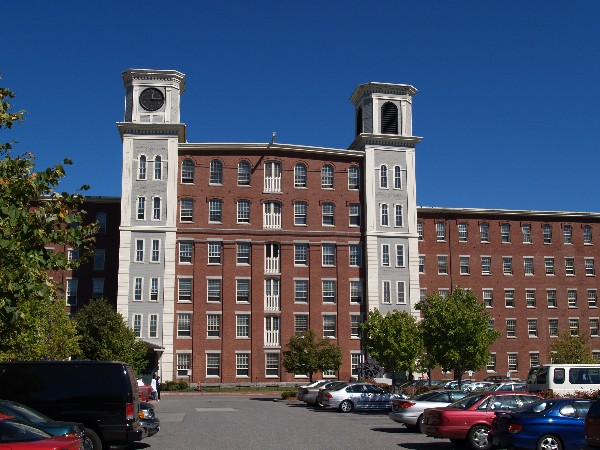
Massachusetts Mills Apartments, Lowell

Mill Conversion or mill rehab is a form of adaptive reuse in which a historic mill or industrial factory building is restored or rehabilitated into another use, such as residential housing, retail shops, office, or a mix of these non-industrial elements (mixed-use).

== Historical background ==
In the United States, the development of industry during the 19th and early 20th centuries resulted in the construction of thousands of mills or factory buildings typically built of brick or stone masonry across the nation, with a high concentration in the Northeast. By 1920, there were hundreds of mill towns across the region built for the production of textiles and other goods, such as shoes, machinery, and other items. However, the Northern textile industry would suffer greatly beginning in the early 1920s, with the failure of many of these companies and the rise in competition from Southern mills. Other industries would follow, especially during the later part of the 20th century, when globalization changed the economy, and entire industries began to move overseas to developing nations. Through the 20th century, many mills carried on in a variety of industrial purposes, other than their originally intended use. Many were used for storage, or other small enterprises. Still, many more remained mostly vacant and underutilized through the mid-20th century and even today. Many vacant mill buildings have become a target for vandalism, arson, and contribute to urban blight in many communities.

A similar scenario has also played out in Great Britain and elsewhere in Europe during this same timeframe.

== Historic awareness movement ==
Beginning in the 1960s, there was a large public outcry throughout the United States for increased historic preservation, to stop the loss of historic structures that had begun during the 1950s with urban renewal projects in big cities and small towns across the nation. A similar movement occurred in Great Britain decades earlier.

One result of this outcry was the establishment of the National Register of Historic Places in 1966, by the Federal Government. Since this time, more than one million listings have been added to the National Register, on many types of structures and places across the country. While not a certain guarantee that a structure will never be demolished, the National Register provides owners with a tool to seek national and state tax credits, grants, and other assistance that may enable the rehabilitation of the building.

Since the 1960s communities across the country have established historic districts and special by-laws in an attempt to preserve and prevent the destruction of properties deemed important to the historical context.

== Mill to museum conversion ==
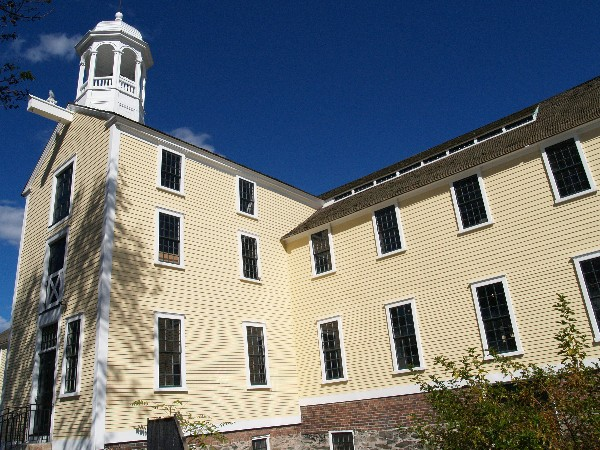
Slater Mill, Pawtucket

The first successful textile mill in the United States was Slater Mill, established by Samuel Slater in Pawtucket, Rhode Island in 1793. With its significant historic value, the drive to restore Slater Mill into a public museum began during the mid-20th century.

In 1971, the Brandywine River Museum of Art opened in Chadds Ford, Pennsylvania, in a converted Civil War-era grist mill. The mill (and an additional 8 1/2 acres) was purchased at auction by the newly formed Brandywine Conservancy. Renovations began in 1970 and the museum opened in 1971. The renovation was done by James R. Grieves Associates, Inc. of Baltimore. Grieves was the only professional consulted who wanted to keep the 19th-century structure intact. Other architects recommended tearing it down and starting over. The museum exhibits Wyeth and American art, with galleries devoted to the works of N.C., Andrew, and Jamie Wyeth.

In 1976, Lowell Heritage State Park was established in Lowell, Massachusetts. In 1978, the United States Congress established Lowell National Historical Park and the Lowell Historic Preservation Commission. The legislation to create the park was sponsored by United States Senator and Lowell native Paul Tsongas. The restoration gathered momentum in the 1980s, including the renovation of the canals and former mill facilities into museums, as well as the construction of a waterfront walkway.

During the 1980s, with the example of Lowell's National Historic Park coming into fruition, the Commonwealth of Massachusetts established a series of Heritage State Parks throughout the state to celebrate and preserve the state's valuable historic (mostly industrial) history. Lawrence Heritage State Park, which occupies a former mill boardinghouse in the city's industrial canal district, is an excellent example.

In 1999, the former Arnold Print Works mills in North Adams, Massachusetts was converted into the Massachusetts Museum of Contemporary Art (MassMOCA).

Not all historic mills can be successfully transformed into museums, however, only with the few, most significantly historic ones has this been possible.

== Mill to residential conversion ==
Since most mills were initially zoned as "industrial" with the emergence of zoning ordinances during the mid- and late 20th century, one of the early obstacles for many planners and developers was convincing local officials that the usefulness of the mills for continuing industry was limited. Business practices were changing, and the old mill buildings were no longer efficient or practical for industry. Even today, most jurisdictions require some sort of special permit or zoning change in order for the conversions to take place.

One of the earliest known conversions of a historic textile mill into residential apartments is the Valley Falls Company south mill located in Central Falls, Rhode Island. This project was completed in 1979, and now includes 133 units of elderly housing.

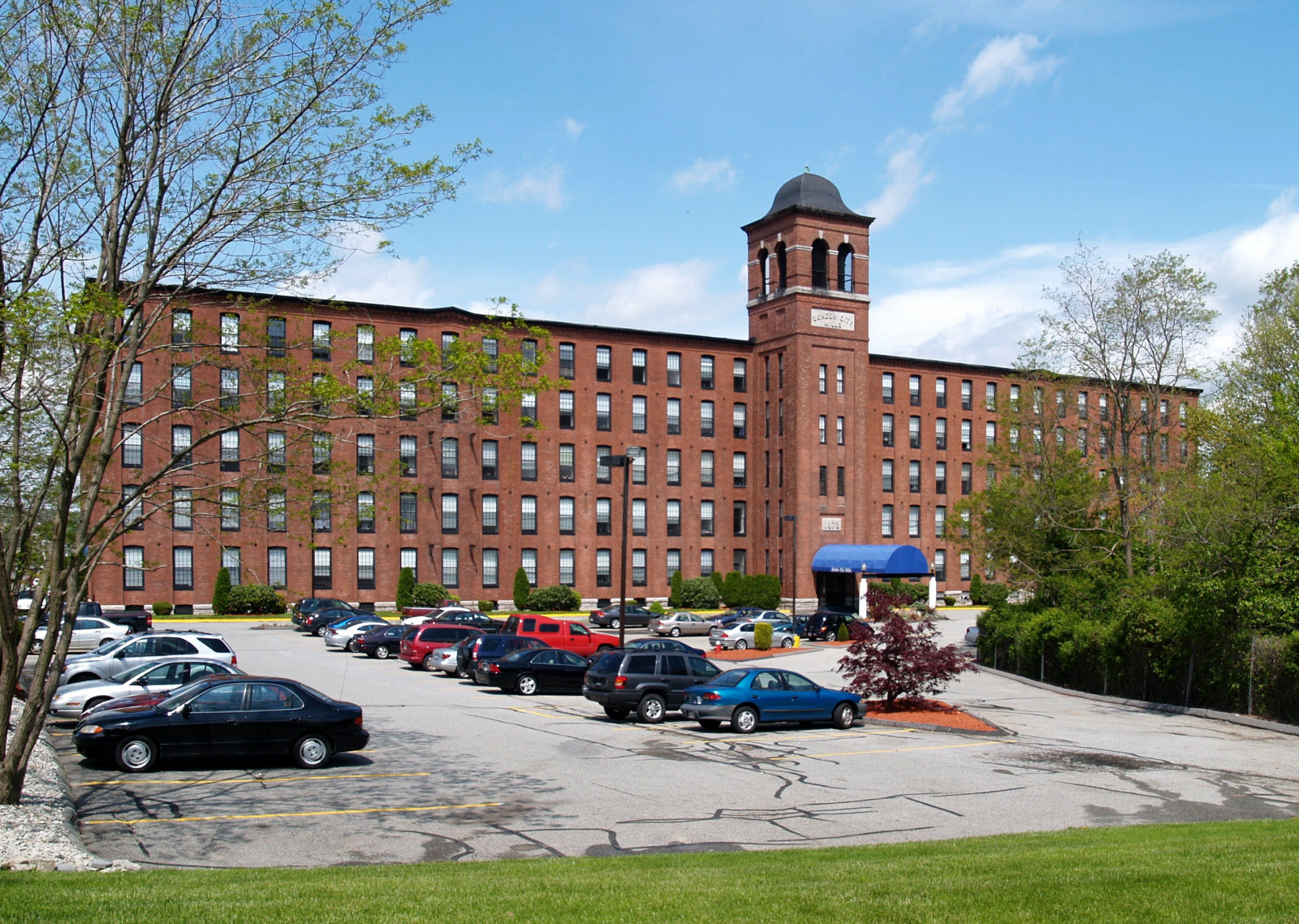
Border City Mill Apartments, Fall River

Other mill conversion projects during the 1980s include the Border City Mill Apartments in Fall River, Massachusetts, situated in a historic 1870s brick cotton mill.

The huge Massachusetts Mills in Lowell, Massachusetts were converted into a 445-unit apartment complex beginning in 1990, while the nearby Market Mills Apartments have 230 units. In recent years, with Massachusetts historic tax credit program, the Boott Mills and Lawrence Mills have been converted into residences also, as part of Lowell's continued revitalization of its historic waterfront area.

Mill conversions have also occurred in other parts of the United States, such as the Cotton Mill Condos in New Orleans, completed in 1997.

In recent years, there has been a trend toward the loft style apartment or condominium unit, with high ceilings, exposed bricks, tall windows, wood floors, and exposed beams or structural elements.

One of the most ambitious mill conversion projects in recent years is the transformation of the huge Wood Mill in Lawrence, Massachusetts. Built in 1906, it was the largest textile mill in the world at the time. The project is known as Monarch on the Merrimack.

== Mill to mixed-use conversion ==
Concurrent with the move to restore former industrial mills into residences has been the conversion of certain sites into a mix of retail shops, offices and restaurants, and other non-industrial uses. During the 1980s, many of the historic cotton mills in Fall River, Massachusetts were converted into factory outlet stores, although with minimal physical alteration other than some partitions and carpeting. The factory outlet stores in Fall River were highly successful for many years, but have in recent years declined, a victim of newer "premium outlet" malls opening up in nearby suburban areas such as Wrentham, Massachusetts, and other locations.

One excellent example of a mill-to-mixed-use conversion in New England is the Clocktower Place, located in the small town of Maynard, Massachusetts. The huge mill complex was originally the Assabet Manufacturing Company, which grew during the 19th century to be one of the largest textile companies in the state, specializing in woolen goods. It was later acquired by the American Woolen Company, and later, by Digital Equipment Corporation until it finally vacated the location in 2001. Since then, the entire complex has been transformed into an office park. It is now home to many companies in differing markets. Its most famous tenant is perhaps Monster.com.

The largest mill-to-mixed-use conversion in New England, however, can be found at Manchester, New Hampshire, with the successful renovation and conversion of the Amoskeag Millyard, once the largest single textile company in the world. The Amoskeag Millyard is the centerpiece of Manchester's waterfront, and includes offices, restaurants, a museum, residences and a university.

== Historic tax credits ==
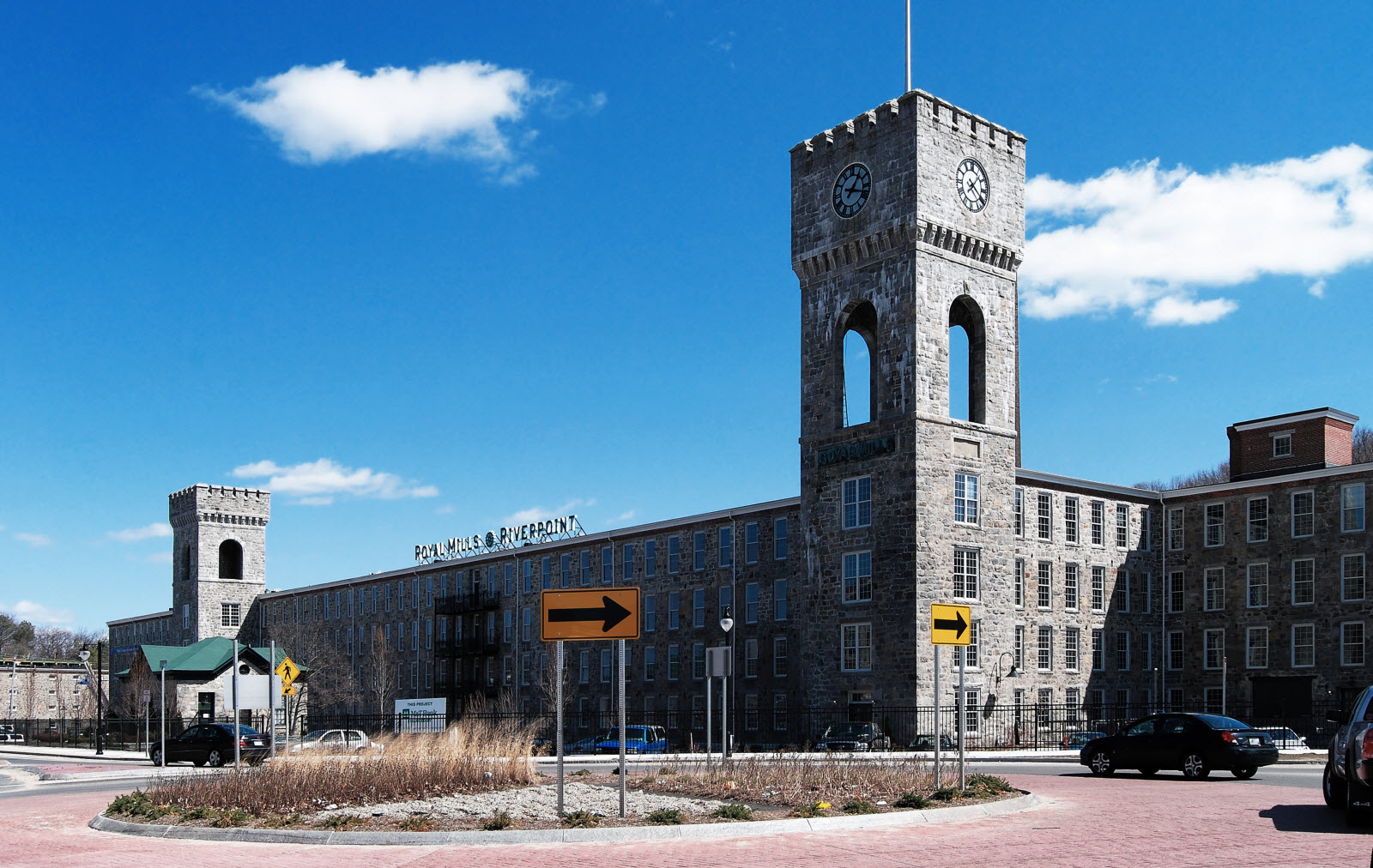
Royal Mills, West Warwick, Rhode Island, an example of a recent mill conversion enabled by the use of historic tax credits

Often, parking, utilities and other infrastructure need to be upgraded as part of the mill conversion process. Many of the old industrial sites contain levels of contamination, which can be very costly for the developers to mitigate.

In recent years, many states have enacted Historic Tax Credit programs in an attempt to enable the rehabilitation of older structures deemed to be "historically significant". Typically, the major criteria for this determination is a listing with the National Register of Historic Places, usually followed by a review by state and local agencies. The development companies typically utilize the tax credits to offset the usually expensive process of renovation and site cleanup.

An example of a Mill conversion utilized by the use of a state historic tax program is the Royal Mills in West Warwick, Rhode Island, redeveloped by SBER a Baltimore-based company with a long history of historic preservation projects. This mill had sat vacant for many years, and was in serious threat of being demolished. The site has since successfully been converted into residential apartments, situated on the Pawtuxet River with a walking trail and bike path nearby.

While recently suspended due to the State's budget crisis, Rhode Island's Historic Tax Credit Program was deemed as one of the most successful in the nation, enabling hundreds of historic structures across the state to be preserved over the past several years since it was enacted.

The benefits historic tax credit programs to state budgets have been often controversial, but there are many indirect economic benefits to local communities.

The property tax value of a restored mill it typically about ten times greater than the existing underutilized mill building, and there is also the added benefit of many construction jobs and other services during the renovation process. The intangible value of having a historic factory building preserved for future generations to enjoy, as well as the benefits to the community are often harder to calculate. The restored mill buildings often become the focal point of the community.

== See also ==
- Cregg Mill
- Slater Mill
- Hilliard Mills
- National Register of Historic Places
- Historic Preservation
- Historic Districts
- Adaptive reuse
- Lowell National Historic Park
