= Hilliardia =

Scientific classification
- Kingdom: Plantae
- Clade: Tracheophytes
- Clade: Angiosperms
- Clade: Eudicots
- Clade: Asterids
- Order: Asterales
- Family: Asteraceae
- Subfamily: Asteroideae
- Tribe: Anthemideae
- Genus: Hilliardia; B.Nord.
- Species: H. zuurbergensis

Binomial name
- Hilliardia zuurbergensis (Oliv.) B.Nord.

Synonyms
- Matricaria zuurbergensis Oliv.

Genus of flowering plants

Hilliardia is a monotypic genus of South African flowering plants in the daisy family. It only contains one known species, Hilliardia zuurbergensis (Oliv.) B.Nord.

It is native to the Eastern Cape Province and KwaZulu-Natal of South Africa.

The genus name of Hilliardia is in honour of Olive Mary Hilliard (1925–2022), a noted South African botanist and taxonomist. The Latin specific epithet of zuurbergensis refers to coming from the Zuurberg Mountains in South Africa. The genus name of Hilliardia and the species of Hilliardia zuurbergensis were first described and published in Opera Bot. Vol.92 on page 147 in 1987.
