= Hillards =

British supermarket chain, 1885–1987

Hillards plc
- Type: Public
- Industry: Retail
- Founded: 1885; 141 years ago
- Founder: John Wesley Hillard
- Defunct: 1987; 39 years ago
- Fate: Acquired and merged into Tesco
- Successor: Tesco
- Headquarters: Cleckheaton, West Yorkshire
- Key people: Peter Hartley (Executive Chairman)
- Products: Groceries

Hillards plc was a small supermarket chain from the North of England, bought out in a hostile takeover by Tesco in May 1987.

== History ==
The company was founded by John Wesley Hillard in 1885, in the West Yorkshire town of Cleckheaton. The first shop was opened in Lion Chambers there, and shortly after 1900, there were twenty shops operating as Lion Stores. By 1951, there were over seventy stores, and by 1968, it had warehouse size stores in Wakefield, Lincoln and York.

In 1970, the trade name Lion Stores was dropped in favour of Hillards and in 1972, the company was first listed on the London Stock Exchange. Peter Hartley, a grandson of the founder, became executive chairman in 1983 and in May 1987, following a hostile bid, the business was acquired by Tesco for £220m.

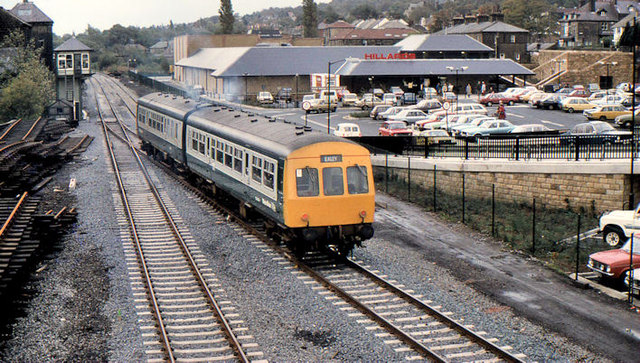
Hillards in Ilkley in 1983, now a Tesco

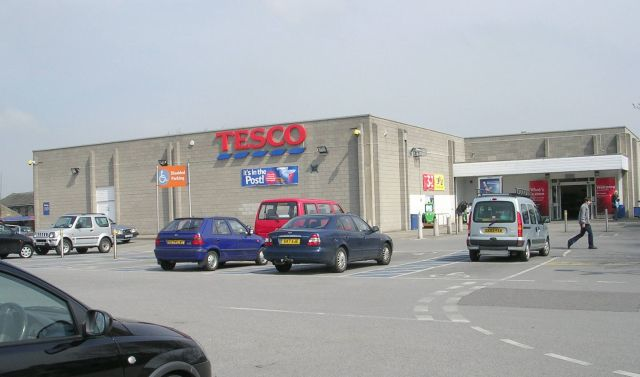
Former Hillards in Cleckheaton, now a Tesco

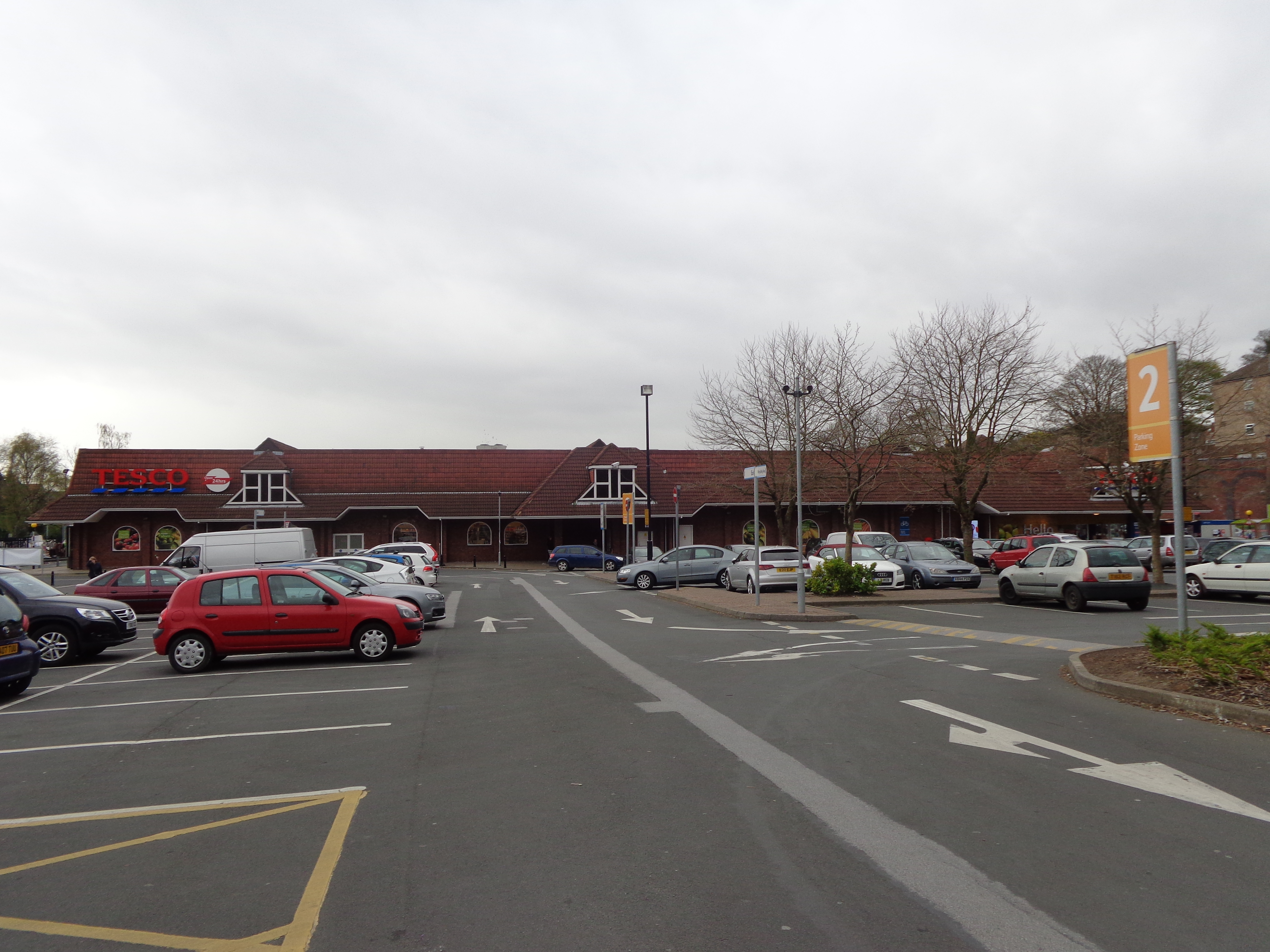
Tesco in Oakwood, Leeds was scheduled to open as a Hillards but opened as Tesco as the chain was acquired mid construction.

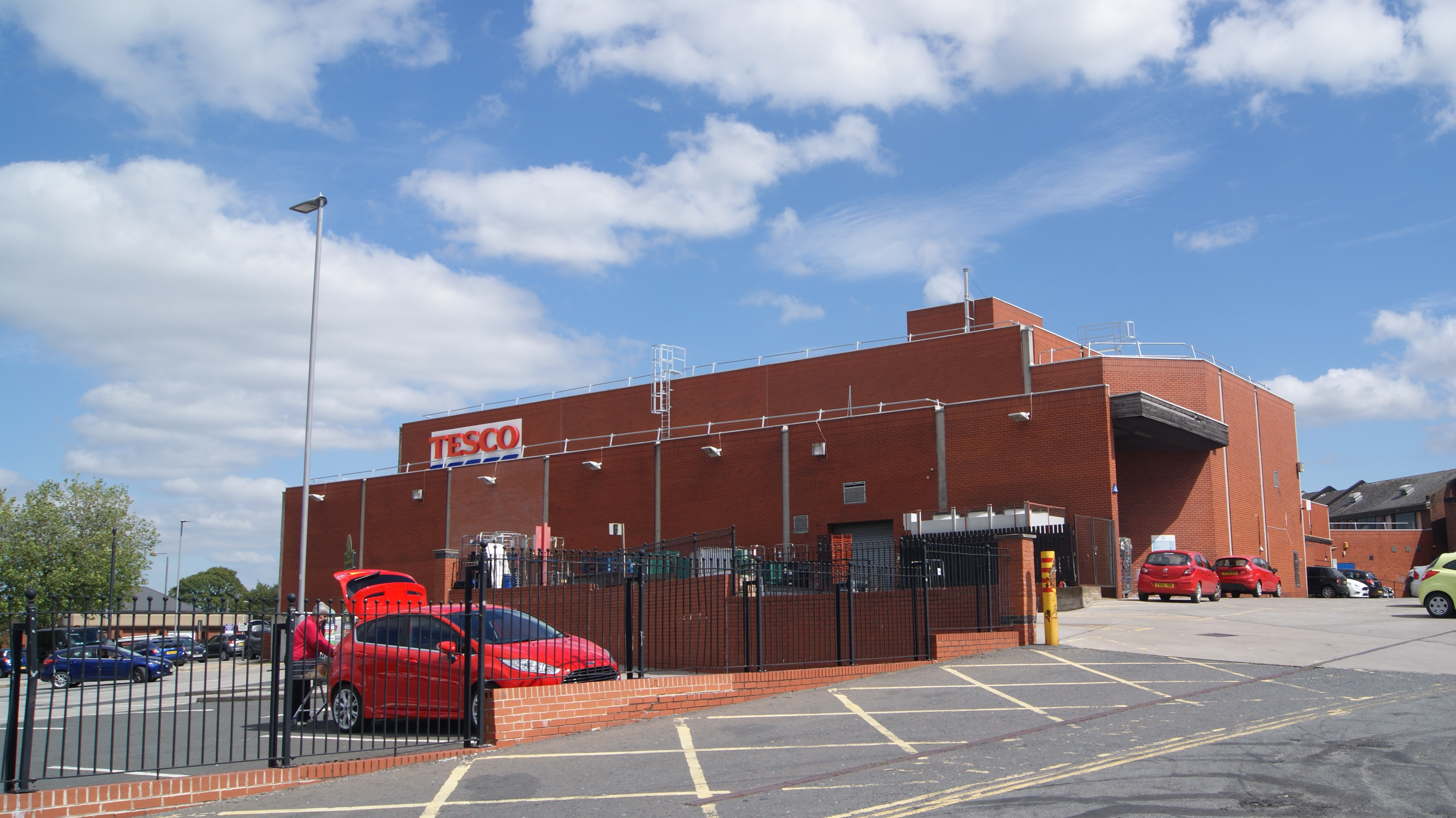
Former Hillards in Pontefract, now a Tesco
