= Hilliards =

Hilliards may refer to:

- Hilliards, Michigan
- Hilliards, Pennsylvania

== See also ==
- Hilliard (disambiguation)
