= Hillared =

- Location within Västra Götaland Location within Sweden
- Coordinates: 57°38′N 13°09′E
- Country: Sweden
- Province: Västergötland
- County: Västra Götaland County
- Municipality: Svenljunga Municipality

Area
  - Total: 1.10 km^{2} (0.42 sq mi)

Population (31 December 2010)
  - Total: 578
  - Density: 523/km^{2} (1,350/sq mi)
- Time zone: UTC+1 (CET)
  - Summer (DST): UTC+2 (CEST)

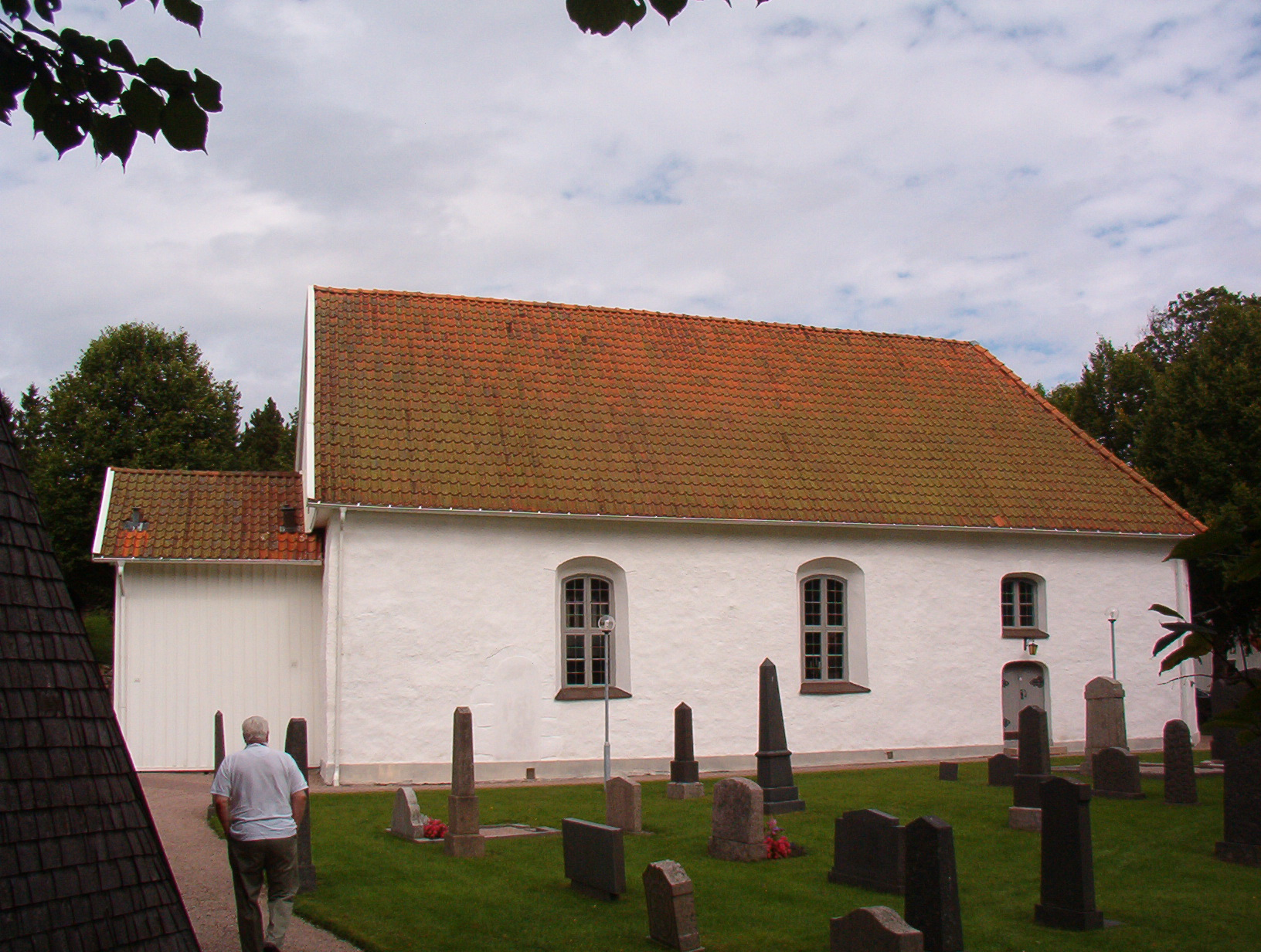
The church in Hillared

Hillared is a locality situated in Svenljunga Municipality, Västra Götaland County, Sweden with 578 inhabitants in 2010.
