= Keefe Peak =

Mountain in the state of Colorado

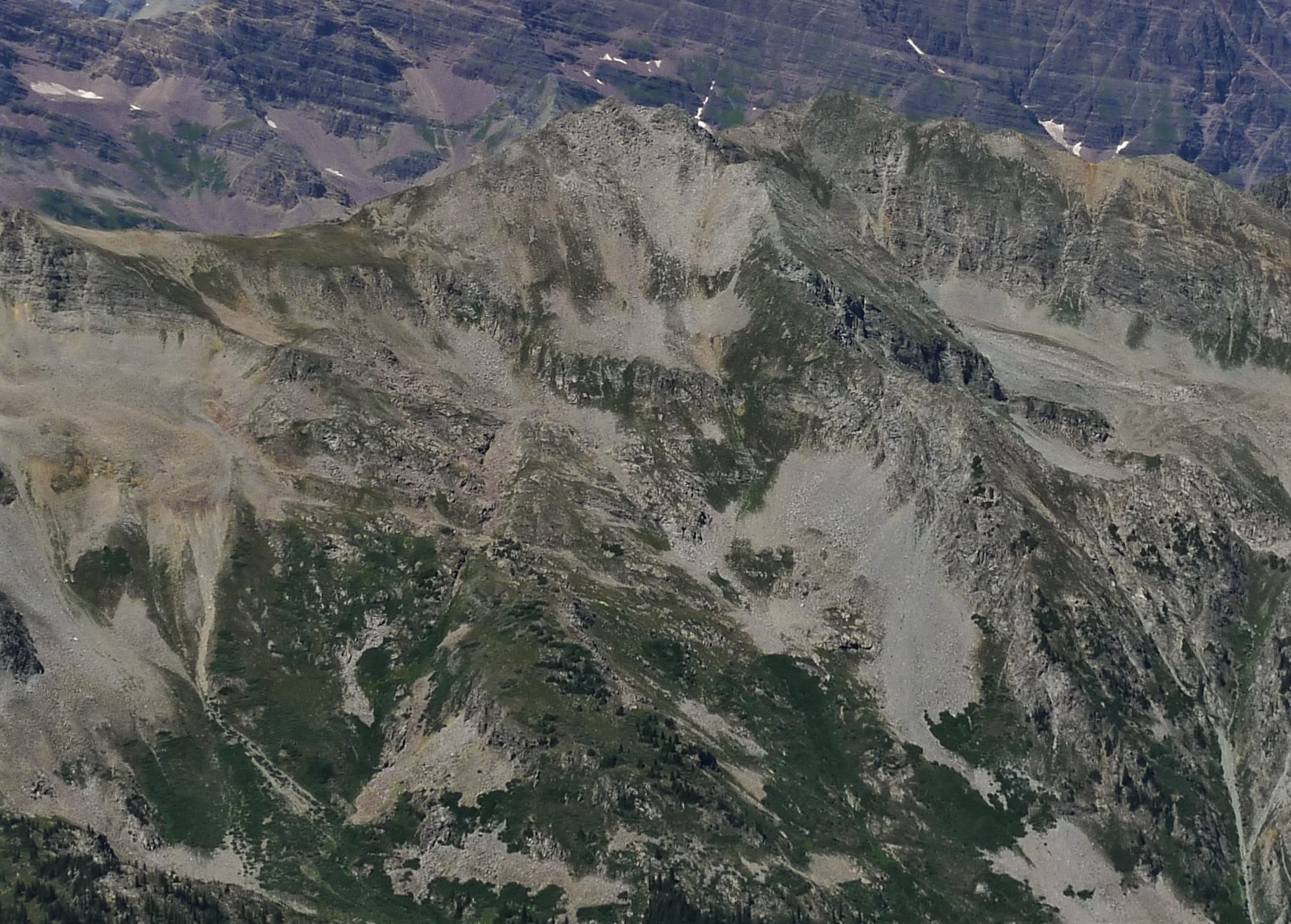
- Southeast aspect, from Castle Peak

Highest point
- Elevation: 13,532 ft (4,125 m)
- Prominence: 497 ft (151 m)
- Parent peak: Peak 13552
- Isolation: 1.31 mi (2.11 km)
- Coordinates: 39°01′57″N 106°54′15″W

Naming
- Etymology: Thomas V. Keefe

Geography
- Location within Colorado Location within the United States
- Country: United States
- State: Colorado
- County: Pitkin
- Protected area: Maroon Bells–Snowmass Wilderness
- Parent range: Rocky Mountains; Elk Mountains
- Topo map: USGS Maroon Bells

Geology
- Rock age: Tertiary
- Rock type: Granodiorite

Climbing
- Easiest route: class 2+

Keefe Peak is a 13,532-foot (4,125 m) mountain summit in Pitkin County, Colorado, United States.

== Description ==
Keefe Peak is located 17 miles (27 km) west of the Continental Divide in the Elk Mountains which are a subrange of the Rocky Mountains. It ranks as the 238th-highest peak in Colorado. The mountain is situated 11 miles (18 km) south-southwest of the community of Aspen and 2.5 miles (4.0 km) northwest of Castle Peak. The peak is set in the Maroon Bells–Snowmass Wilderness on land managed by White River National Forest. Precipitation runoff from the mountain's slopes drains into tributaries of the Roaring Fork River which is a tributary of the Colorado River. Topographic relief is significant as the summit rises 3,000 feet (914 m) above Conundrum Creek in 1.1 miles (1.8 km) and 2,900 feet (884 m) above East Maroon Creek in 1.6 miles (2.6 km).

== Etymology ==
The mountain's toponym was officially adopted as "Keefe Mountain" on May 6, 1925, by the United States Board on Geographic Names and revised to "Keefe Peak" on February 2, 1927. The US Forest Service made the suggestion to commemorate one of their former employees, Lieutenant Thomas Victor Keefe (1888–1918), who died while serving in the US Army. The peak is within the territory he served the Forest Service as a deputy forest supervisor. He was born and raised in Blossburg, Pennsylvania, and graduated from Pennsylvania State College in 1913 with a Bachelor of Science degree in forestry.

== Climate ==
According to the Köppen climate classification system, Keefe Peak is located in an alpine subarctic climate zone with cold, snowy winters, and cool to warm summers. Due to its altitude, it receives precipitation all year, as snow in winter, and as thunderstorms in summer, with a dry period in late spring.

== See also ==
- Mountains of Pitkin County, Colorado
- Thirteener
