= David Hilliard (photographer) =

American photographer (born 1964)

David Hilliard (born 1964 in Lowell, Massachusetts) is an American photographer. A fine arts photographer who works mainly with panoramic photographs, he draws inspiration from his personal life and those around him for his subject matter. Many of the scenes are staged, evoking a performative quality, a middle ground between fact and fiction.

He received his BFA from the Massachusetts College of Art and Design in 1992 and his MFA from Yale University in 1994. During his time at Yale, he studied with photographers who shot in the panoramic style and focused on the technical aspect of the medium.

Hilliard has served as assistant professor in Boston at the Massachusetts College of Art and Design and as Artist-in-Residence in the Photography Department at the Cranbrook Academy of Art in Michigan. He has also taught at Harvard University and the School of the Museum of Fine Arts in Boston.

== Education ==
- 1994 MFA, Yale University School of Art, New Haven, Connecticut
- 1992 BFA, Massachusetts College of Art and Design, Boston, Massachusetts

== Exhibitions ==
Recent Solo Exhibitions

- 2017 David Hilliard - Provincetown Art Association and Museum, Provincetown, Massachusetts
- 2016 “Our Nature”, Mattatuck Museum, Waterbury, Connecticut
- 2015 “Our Nature”, Elizabeth Leach Gallery, Portland, Oregon
- 2014 “Tall Tales & Short Stories”, Florida Museum of Photographic Arts, Tampa, Florida
- 2013 “The Tale is True”, La Galerie Particuliere, Paris, France
- 2013 "The Tale is True," Yancey Richardson Gallery, New York, New York
- 2012 Art Museum at the University of Kentucky, Lexington, Kentucky
- 2012 Watkins College of Art, Design & Film, Nashville, Tennessee
- 2011 "The Lives of David Hilliard," La Galerie Particuliere, Paris, France
- 2011 "Great Expectations: David Hilliard & David Rathman," Mark Moore Gallery, Culver City, California
- 2011 "Masculinity and Rites of Passage: Photography by David Hilliard," The Groton School, Groton, Massachusetts
- 2010 “Tending to Doubt,” Jackson Fine Art, Atlanta, Georgia
- 2010 “Highway of Thought,” Dartmouth College, Hanover, New Hampshire
- 2009 “Highway of Thought,” University of Maine Museum of Art, Bangor, Maine
- 2009 “Being Like,” Mark Moore Gallery, Santa Monica, California
- 2009 “Being Like,” Carroll and Sons, Boston, Massachusetts
- 2008 “Being Like,” Yancey Richardson Gallery, New York, New York

Recent group exhibitions

- 2014 “Through the Lens: Portraiture & Self Portraiture”, Elizabeth Leach Gallery, Portland, Oregon
- 2014 “Breaking Ground”, the College of William & Mary, Williamsburg, Virginia
- 2014 “Glimpse,” Gallery at Cassilhaus Chapel Hill, North Carolina
- 2014 “In Residence: Contemporary Artists at Dartmouth”, Hood Museum of Art, Hanover, New Hampshire
- 2013 “The Kids Are All Right”, Addison Museum of American Art, Andover, Massachusetts
- 2013 “Transgressive Photography from the Hood Museum of Art”, Hanover, Massachusetts
- 2013 “Woods, Lovely, Dark and Deep”, DC Moore Gallery, New York, New York
- 2013 A selection of images from “The Tale is True”, Schoolhouse Gallery, Provincetown, Massachusetts
- 2013 “Stocked: Contemporary Art from the Grocery Aisles”, Ulrich Museum of Art, Wichita, Kansas
- 2012 “The Kids Are All Right”, Kohler Arts Center, Sheboygan, Wisconsin
- 2012 “Shared Vision: The Sondra Gilman and Celso Gonzalez-Falla Collection of Photography,” Aperture Foundation, New York, New York
- 2012 “Do or Die. The Human Condition in Painting and Photography,” Stiftung Deutsches Hygiene Museum, Dresden, Germany
- 2011 “Beautiful Vagabonds, Birds in Contemporary Photography, Video and Sound,” Yancey Richardson Gallery, New York, New York
- 2011 “Hero Worship”, Mindy Sololmon Gallery, St. Petersburg, Florida
- 2011 “Conversations: Photography from the Bank of America Collection”, Museum of Fine Arts Boston, Boston, Massachusetts
- 2011 “Becoming Muses” The Center for Photography at Woodstock, Woodstock, New York
- 2011 “Masculinity and Rites of Passage: Photography by David Hilliard”, The Groton School, Groton, Massachusetts
- 2011 “People Power Places: Reframing the American Landscape”, Davidson College, Davidson, North Carolina
- 2011 “Remember Then: An Exhibition on the Photography of Memory”, Concourse Gallery - Center for Government and International Studies, Harvard University, Cambridge, Massachusetts
- 2011 “Open: A 25th Anniversary Show”, Mark Moore Gallery, Culver City, California
- 2010 “Incognito, The Hidden Self-Portrait”, Yancey Richardson Gallery, New York, New York
- 2010 “Do or Die. The Human Condition in Painting and Photography,” The Wallraf-Richartz, Museum & Foundation Corboud, Cologne, Germany
- 2009 “Out of the Box: Photography Portfolios from the Permanent Collection,” DeCordova Museum, Lincoln, Massachusetts
- 2009 “Athens of America,” St. Botolph Club, Boston, Massachusetts
- 2009 “Glitz and Grime,” Yancey Richardson Gallery, New York, New York
- 2008 “The Gaze,” Singer Editions, Boston, Massachusetts
- 2008 “The Good Life,” Yancey Richardson Gallery, New York, New York
- 2008 “For Artʼs Sake,” Open House Gallery, New York, New York,
- 2008 “Presumed Innocence: Photographs of Children,” DeCordova Museum and Sculpture Park, Lincoln, Massachusetts

Complete exhibitions list available here: David Hilliard's CV

== Selected collections ==
- Art Museum at the University of Kentucky, Lexington, Kentucky
- Addison Gallery of American Art, Andover, Massachusetts
- Art Institute of Chicago Art Museum, Chicago, Illinois
- Columbia Museum of Art, Columbia, South Carolina
- Fidelity Investments, Boston, Massachusetts
- Fogg Museum, Harvard University, Cambridge, Massachusetts
- George Eastman House, Rochester, New York
- Harvard Art Museum, Cambridge, Massachusetts
- LaSalle Bank Photography Collection, Chicago, Illinois
- List Visual Art Center, Massachusetts Institute of Technology, Cambridge, Massachusetts
- Miami Art Museum, Miami, Florida
- Microsoft Art Collection, Redmond, Washington
- Museum of Contemporary Art, Los Angeles, California
- Museum of Contemporary Art, Jacksonville, Florida
- Museum of Fine Arts, Boston, Massachusetts
- Neuberger and Berman, New York, New York
- New Britain Museum of American Art, New Britain, Connecticut
- New Mexico Museum of Art, Santa Fe, New Mexico
- Philadelphia Museum of Art, Philadelphia, Pennsylvania
- Portland Museum of Art, Portland, Oregon
- Sir Elton John, Atlanta, Georgia - London, England
- The Boston Public Library, Boston, Massachusetts
- The Cleveland Clinic, Lyndurst, Ohio
- The Columbia Museum of Art, South Carolina
- The Community of Madrid, Madrid, Spain
- The DeCordova Museum, Lincoln, Massachusetts
- The Los Angeles County Museum, Los Angeles, California
- The University of Maine, Bangor, Maine
- The University of Salamanca, Salamanca, Spain
- Whitney Museum of American Art, New York, New York
- Yale University Art Gallery, New Haven, Connecticut

== Grants and awards ==
- 2015 Artist residency, Twenty Summers, Provincetown, Massachusetts
- 2015 Bok Center Award for excellence in teaching, Harvard University, Cambridge, Massachusetts
- 2012 Bok Center Award for excellence in teaching, Harvard University, Cambridge, Massachusetts
- 2010 Artist in residence, Dartmouth College, Hanover, New Hampshire
- 2008 Massachusetts College of Art and Design Alumni Association Achievement Award, Boston, Massachusetts
- 2002 Peter S. Reed Foundation Grant, New York, New York
- 2001 John Simon Guggenheim Foundation Fellowship, New York, New York
- 2000 Certificate of Distinction in Teaching, Harvard University, Cambridge, Massachusetts
- 1999 Artist grant, Massachusetts Cultural Council, Boston, Massachusetts
- 1995 Fulbright Grant, exchange between U.S. and Spain (Barcelona)
- 1994 Alice Kimball English Travel Fellowship, Yale University, New Haven, Connecticut
