= Hilliard P. Jenkins =

American farmer, philanthropist, and civic leader (1922–1992)

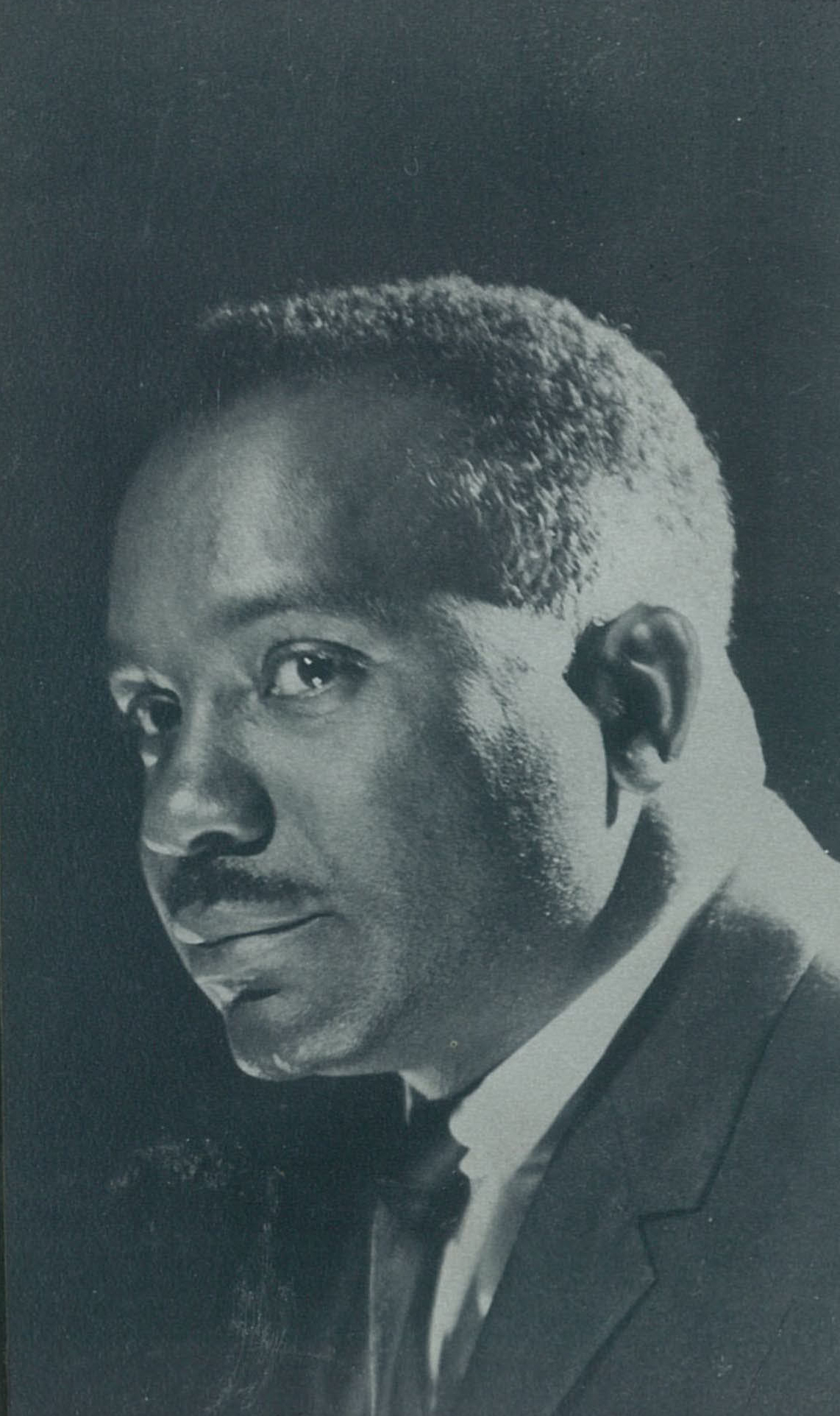
Hilliard P. Jenkins

Hilliard P. Jenkins (February 29, 1922 - August 23, 1992) was an American farmer, philanthropist, and civic leader. His family homestead, located in Loxley, Alabama, was considered one of the state's richest farms, and he earned distinction for his agricultural techniques. Jenkins also maintained leadership positions in a number of statewide and county organizations, including the Alabama Democratic Conference.

== Farm life ==
One of 10 children, Jenkins was a lifelong resident of Loxley. His father, John Wesley Jenkins, purchased a 40-acre (160,000 m^{2}) turpentine farm in 1926. After his death in 1935, the custody of the farm fell to Jenkins' mother, Amelia Taylor Jenkins, and the older Jenkins children.

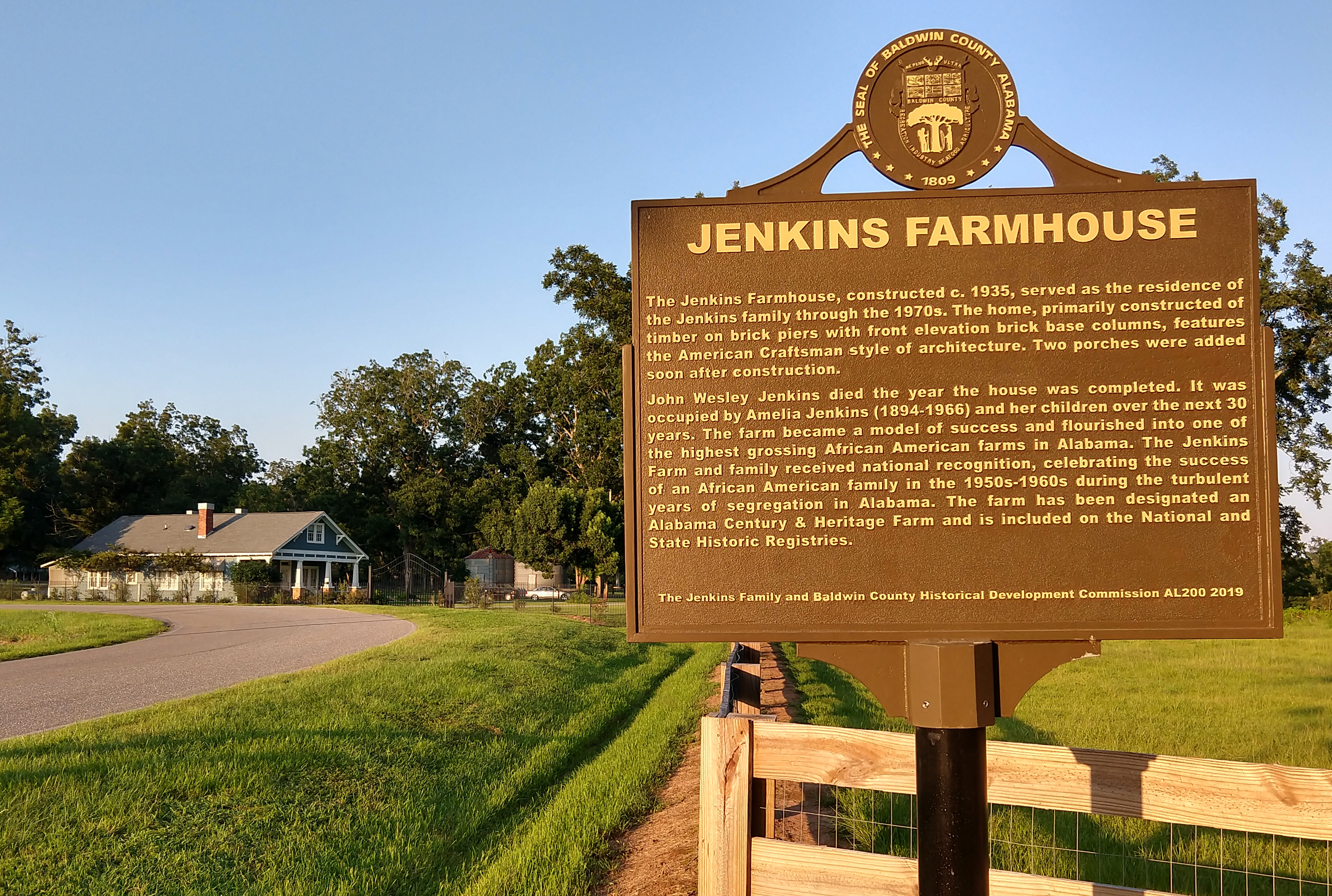
Jenkins Farmhouse

Over the next two and a half decades, Amelia oversaw the dramatic growth of the farm into a 1,052-acre (4.26 km^{2}) enterprise. When Jenkins came of age, he became general manager of the farm and continued to increase the farm's productivity, all while cultivating a wide variety of crops that enjoyed harvests throughout the entire growing season.

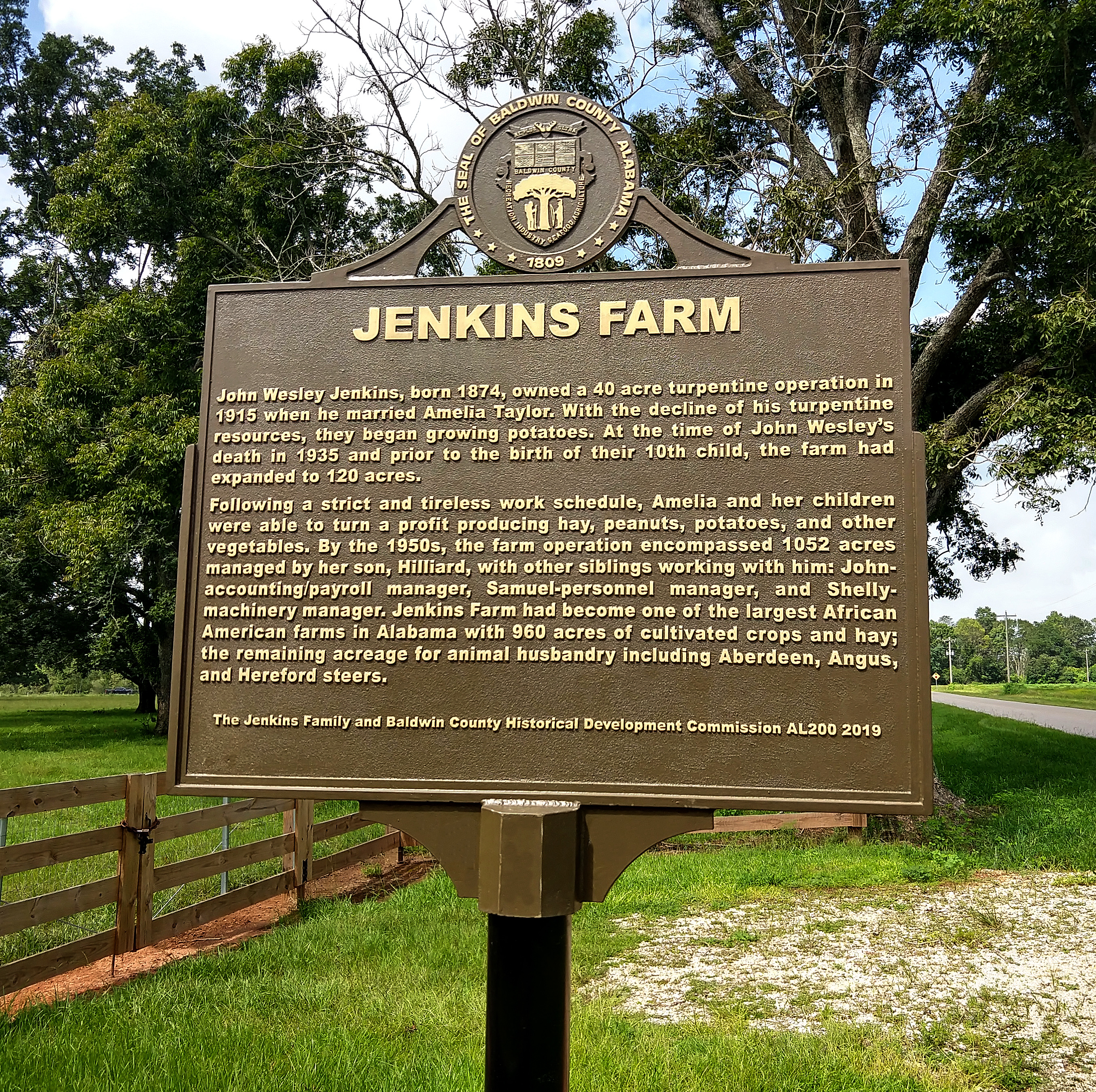
Jenkins Farm historical marker

During his youth, Jenkins, despite a lack of formal agricultural training, had a knack for learning the best scientific farming practices. His self-taught knowledge of agricultural methods and their application helped make the farm a vastly profitable enterprise that earned the Jenkins prestige among farmers white and black. He also garnered the Negro Farm Family Merit Award, bestowed by the Tuskegee Institute in 1952. The Jenkins' financial and social stature gained them national press in Ebony magazine.

== Public service ==
As an Alabamian living under Jim Crow, Jenkins followed an example set by Amelia of using economic power to improve the sociopolitical status of fellow African-American neighbors. Employees of the Jenkins farm had the freedom and assistance to engage in community organizing and political activities like voting drives, unlike their counterparts whose white employers typically who did not lend support or, more commonly, sought to clamp down on their political activities.

For several decades, Jenkins was committed to public service in various ways, often as a community organizer. An advocate for a wider African-American vote, he was a longtime member of the Alabama Democratic Conference (ADC), which seeks to raise the political status of African-Americans and increase their participation in the political system. For over 20 years, he served as chairman of the ADC's Baldwin County unit. Jenkins served in other leadership roles with the Mobile-Baldwin Area Boy Scouts of America, the Baldwin County Mental Health Board, the Baldwin County Executive Committee, and the Alabama Selective Service Board.

== Legacy ==
Jenkins' legacy is carried on by his four children, 12 grandchildren, three great-grandchildren, and numerous citizens throughout Alabama and the South.

In late 2009, the consulting group Frontline Solutions established the Hilliard P. Jenkins Undergraduate Fellowship Program as a way to honor the Alabama farmer. The program, designed for students who excel in the areas of social justice and entrepreneurship, orients Fellows to the work of empowering low-income communities through the organic, grassroots approach forged by Jenkins.
