= Hilliard, Missouri =

- Unincorporated community
- Location within Missouri Location within the United States
- Coordinates: 36°49′31″N 90°25′00″W
- Country: United States
- State: Missouri
- County: Butler
- Elevation: 361 ft (110 m)
- Time zone: UTC-6 (Central (CST))
  - Summer (DST): UTC-5 (CDT)
- Area code: 573
- GNIS feature ID: 750334

Hilliard is an unincorporated community in northern Butler County, in the U.S. state of Missouri. The community is located on Missouri Route W about three miles north of Poplar Bluff. It sits on the east margin of the Black River floodplain at an elevation of 361 feet. The community of Wilby lies three miles to the north-northwest along the Black River. The Missouri Pacific Railway passes the east side of the community along the margin of the Black River floodplain. The small Lake Locloma lies just to the west of the Black River along Route W.

== History ==
A post office called Hilliard was established in 1884 and remained in operation until 1906. The community's name is derived from "Hill's Yard", a railroad yard owned by George W. Hill.
