= Hillyard =

Hillyard may refer to:

== People with the surname ==
- Blanche Bingley Hillyard (1863–1946), English tennis player
- Dave Hillyard, American musician
- George Hillyard (1864–1943), English tennis player
- Lyle W. Hillyard (born 1940), American politician

== Places in the United States ==
- Hillyard, Spokane, Washington, a neighborhood
- Hillyard Township, Macoupin County, Illinois
- Hillyard Cabin, cabin in Randolph County, Arkansas on National Register of Historic Places

== Other uses ==
- Hillyard, Inc., specialist in maintenance of basketball courts
