= Hilliard Mills =

American historic mill site

Coordinates: 41.784765°N 72.55213°W

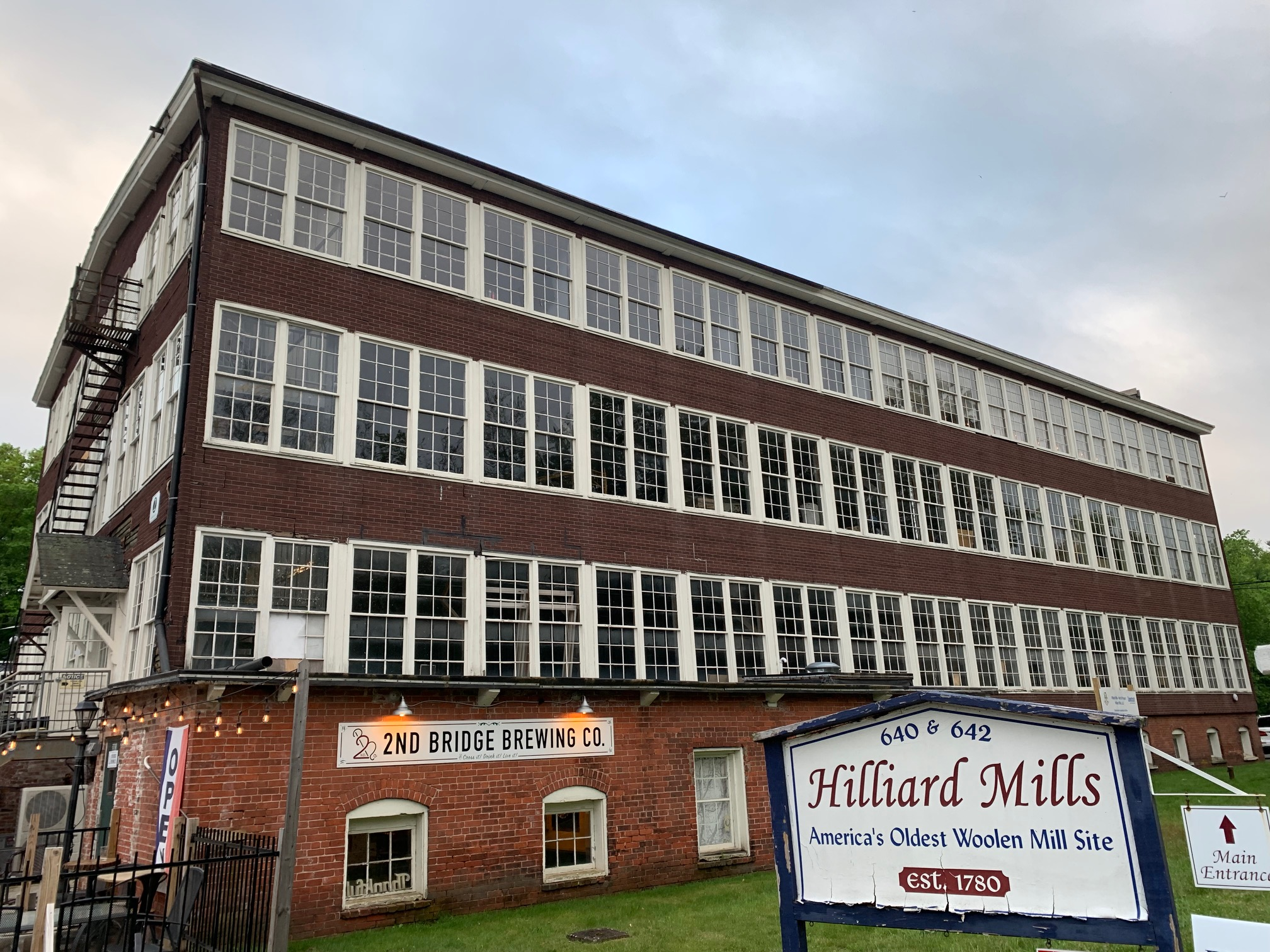
- Interactive map of the Hilliard Mills area

General information
- Location: 642 Hilliard Street, Manchester, Connecticut, United States

Hilliard Mills is a historic mill site located at 642 Hilliard Street in Manchester, Connecticut, west of Adams Street. The property consists of six buildings comprising roughly 105,000 square feet of space, spread over five acres at the confluence of the Bigelow Brook and Hockanum River. Hilliard Mills is listed on the State of Connecticut Register of Historic Places.

== History ==
In 1672, John Allyn was granted land for a sawmill by the General Court of the Colony of Connecticut, making the location one of the oldest (if not the oldest) continuously occupied industrial sites in the country. Early American industrialist Aaron Buckland already had a woolen mill in operation at the site circa 1780, making it the oldest woolen mill in the country. Blankets for soldiers in the War of 1812 came from this factory. In 1824, Aaron Buckland sold the mill to Tracy and Williams. In 1828, Tracy and Williams conveyed the property to Sidney Pitkin, who took on Elisha Edgarton Hilliard as an apprentice there.

In 1832, Hilliard became one-quarter owner and by 1842 became sole owner of the mill. In 1849, E. E. Hilliard sold one quarter of his interests to Ralph E. Spencer and the business was known as Hilliard and Spencer. By 1871, the factory was again solely owned by Hilliard and named the E. E. Hilliard Company. During Hilliard's tenure, the company made blankets and clothing for the Union Army in the American Civil War. After the death of E. E. Hilliard in 1881, his son took over the family business and built the structure known today as Building #2 in 1895. The company acquired the rights to a brick-lined pond in 1901, the former Peter Adams site, and built a long raceway that extended through Building #4 for both power and washing requirements. The mill was further expanded in 1925 by the addition of Building #1 to accommodate the upturn in business.

The Great Depression took its toll on the business, and the mills closed in 1940. At the time, the Hilliard Company was the oldest family-owned, continuously operated factory in the United States. The site was then sold to Aaron Krock, who leased them to United Aircraft. During World War II, the site was known as Plant J at Buckland. Small tubes, tappets, and roller guides were manufactured at Plant J, and tool refurbishment for all of United Aircraft was completed at the site.

In 1949, the entire site was purchased by the Bezzini Brothers for their company Old Colony Furniture. At the company's height, it was one of the largest furniture manufacturers on the east coast and supplied Macy's, G. Fox & Co., Saks Fifth Avenue, and other retailers. It was known for its high-quality upholstery.

In 2006, the Bezzini brothers sold the remaining three buildings to Hilliard Mills LLC. In 2009, Hilliard Mills LLC acquired the last remaining mill buildings to the east, reuniting the site for the first time since 1980.

== Structures ==
Many different buildings were constructed on the site during the past 350-plus years.

=== Current structures ===
Building #1: Was constructed in 1925 by the H.W. Lines Company. It was designed by Charles T. Main of New York. The front facade is in the Art Deco Style, while the other three sides are classic New England Mill in design. The 1925 cost of the building was $151,421. It is one of the oldest examples of Art Deco architecture in Connecticut. At three floors and about 50,000 total square feet, this is the largest building at the site, made of brick, steel and heavy timbers. Building #1 is connected to Building #2.

Building #2: This building was constructed in 1895. At four stories and 30,000 square feet, it is the largest timber frame non-barn building in Connecticut. The main beams are almost all made of longleaf pine, with some over 40 feet long. Building #2 is connected to Building #1 at the west end.

Building #3: This building was constructed in two phases, the south 50' by 40' portion was constructed in 1882 as an addition to Building #6and the north portion of 50' was added in 1905. At two stories and 8,000 total square feet, Building #3 is in the brick and timber style.

Building #4: This building was constructed as the dye house for the site in the mid-1800s. The current building was built in two phases, 1902 and 1923. The original brick floor from the 1800s structure is still visible. This building has a clerestory, making it unique in design at the site. It is one story and 6,630 square feet.

Building #5: This building was constructed as an office add-on around 1890 and is next to Building #6. It is styled in the Queen Anne style and is less than 1,000 square feet in size.

Building #6: Around 1780, Buckland built his carding mill along the Bigelow Brook. Originally roughly 18' by 30', this structure largely burned in 1833. In 1833–34, Building #6 was rebuilt and a 50' by 32' three story addition was added to the structure to the north, made of hand-hewn chestnut and oak beams. Around 1845 a 30' addition facing north was added, constructed of mostly hand-hewn oak timbers. Other softwood additions were made in the late 1800s, which were removed in 2009 and 2010. Building #6 at 10,240 square feet and three stories plus an attic is currently shaped, but not restored to, how it was during the Civil War and is in the Greek Revival Style.

Original Dam: The original earthen and granite dam is still visible to the south of Building #6. It was damaged by floods in 1869, 1909 and 1938. The portion across the brook is gone, but the granite stones still can be seen along the brook.

=== Former structures ===
John Allyn's Sawmill: Constructed in the 1670s, nothing remains of those original buildings.

Carding Mill: Constructed around 1780 by Aaron Buckland, the original carding mill was approximately 18' x 30'. In 1833 a fire destroyed the building, which was rebuilt along with an addition to the north in 1833/1834. The ruins of the carding mill were beyond repair and removed for safety in late 2015. One of the original 1700s beams was saved for future display.

Boiler House: Originally the boiler house for the mill was constructed in the mid-1800s and was removed in 1995. Some of the boiler house wall is still visible in Building #4.

Building #7: This building was constructed in two major steps. A smaller one-story addition was added around 1880 and subsequently two more stories were added in 1907. The building was heavily damaged in the flood of 1909. This building was demolished in 2009 for safety reasons, but the beams, bricks and flooring were recycled. The flooring from the third floor can be seen at the loom exhibit at the Manchester Historical Society on Pine Street.

Building #8: This building originally stand alone next to the Bigelow Brook. Built in 1892 of brick and heavy timbers, the building suffered damage both in the 1909 flood and improper modifications in the 1970s. This building was demolished in 2009.

Building #9: This barn like building was built around 1900 and was demolished around 1997.

Wool Barn: The wool barn once stood where Building #1 is today and was demolished in 1925.

Chimney: The great square Hilliard Mills chimney once stood at an impressive 107 feet tall. The upper 60 feet were removed in 1995, and the ruins were cleared in 2008.

Hilliard's Pond and Dam: A large concrete dam was created south of West Middle Turnpike. A large riveted pipe over 1000' in length lead from the dam to Building #6 to power the turbine. The dam was intentionally breached in 1978 and was located to the rear of the Bigelow Brook Estates Condominiums.

Water Tower: Constructed in 1925 by Chicago Steel, the 50,000 gallon tank used to feed the sprinkler system at the site. This tower was scrapped and removed in 1995.

Horizontal Turbine, Penstock and Mill Raceway: The penstock started from Hilliard's Pond and led all the way under Building #6 to a horizontal turbine. The turbine is still in place at the site and was uncovered in September 2016, with plans for a historical display/point of interest to be constructed at that location. The raceway has been largely filled in between the turbine and Building #1.

== Timeline ==
1672: John Allyn, Secretary of the Colony of Connecticut, is granted land by the King of England for a sawmill at the site

ca. 1780-1824: Aaron Buckland founds and operates the first woolen mill in the country.

1789: The wool used to make the suit for George Washington's Inauguration purportedly comes from Buckland's mill.

1824: Aaron Buckland sells to the mill to Andrew Williams and Simon Tracy.

1828: Tracy and Williams convey the property to Sidney Pitkin.

1831: Apprentice Elisha E. Hilliard is made one quarter owner of the mill.

1833/1834: Building #6 is reconstructed after a fire.

1842: E. E. Hilliard buys Pitkin's interest in the mill and becomes sole owner.

1849: Hilliard sells one quarter to Ralph Spencer, forms Hilliard and Spencer Company.

1875/1902/1923: Building #4 is constructed in phases

1871-1940: Spencer sells his interests back, Hilliard and his successors found and operate the E.E. Hilliard Woolen Company on the site.

1882/1905: Building #3 is constructed

1892: Building #5 is constructed

1895/1896: Building #2 is constructed

1925: Building #1 is constructed

1940-1949: Buildings purchased by Aaron Krock. The site was used to manufacture aircraft parts during World War II by the Pratt and Whitney Corporation.

1949-2006: Purchased by the Bezzini family, Old Colony Furniture Company had a long and successful history as one of the largest furniture makers on the east coast.

2006: Hilliard Mills LLC takes over the main site, which includes Buildings #1, #2 and #4, and begins the restoration efforts.

2009: Hilliard Mills LLC acquires the remaining portion of the mills to the east, which includes Buildings #3, #5 and #6.

== Current ==
The Hilliard Mills site is undergoing redevelopment for business/commercial uses by Hilliard Mills LLC. Redevelopment has accelerated since the fall of 2015 and continues as of today. This project is a prime example of adaptive reuse and mill conversion. All buildings are undergoing extensive restoration and renovation, with Buildings 1, 2, 3 and 4 currently in use. In addition to the building work, considerable site, parking and landscaping work is also in progress.
