= Olive Mary Hilliard =

South African botanist (1925–2022)

Olive Mary Hilliard Burtt
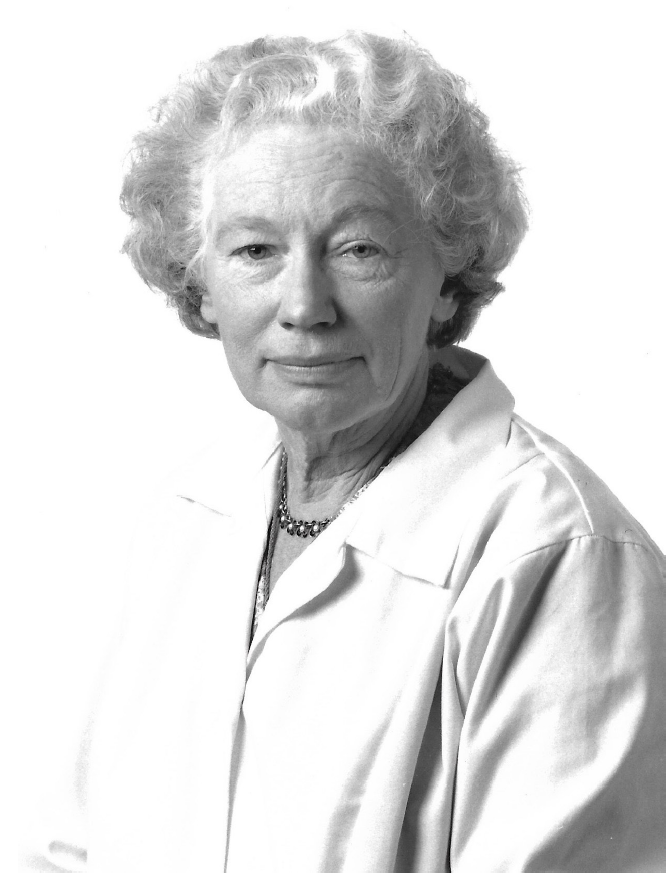
- Born: Olive Mary Hillary; 4 July 1925 (age 101); Durban, South Africa
- Died: 30 November 2022 (aged 97)
- Education: University of Natal
- Occupation: Botanist
- Spouse: B. L. Burtt
- Awards: Kirstenbosch Jubilee Prize (1983); Gold Medal of the South African Association of Botanists (1984); D.Sc. (honoris causa), University of Natal (1991); Veitch Memorial Gold Medal, Royal Horticultural Society (1992)
- Scientific career
- Workplaces: Royal Botanic Garden Edinburgh
- Thesis: "A taxonomic revision of Streptocarpus subgenus Streptocarpus in Natal." (1965)

Olive Mary Hilliard (née Hillary, 4 July 1925 – 30 November 2022) was a South African botanist and taxonomist. Hilliard authored 372 land plant species names, the fifth-highest number of such names authored by any female scientist.

Hilliard was born in Durban on 4 July 1925. She attended Natal University from 1943 to 1947, where she obtained an MSc and later a PhD. She worked at the National Herbarium in Pretoria in 1947-48 and was a lecturer in botany at Natal University from 1954 to 1962. In 1963 she became curator of the herbarium at Natal University and a research fellow. Her special fields of interest were the flora of Natal and the taxonomy of Streptocarpus, Compositae and Scrophulariaceae.

In 1964 she formed a professional and personal collaboration with Brian Laurence Burtt (1913-2008) who played a large part in the revitalising of a moribund Royal Botanic Garden Edinburgh. Their collaboration resulted in numerous papers and three books, Streptocarpus: an African Plant Study (1971), The Botany of the Southern Natal Drakensberg (1987), and Dierama: The Hairbells of Africa (1991).

Hilliard died on 30 November 2022, at the age of 97.

== Legacy ==
Hilliard collected specimens, mostly from the Natal Drakensberg and Malawi, number some 8000 (of which 5000 were collected with B. L. Burtt). She is commemorated in the 2 genera of Hilliardia and Hilliardiella (both in the Asteraceae family). She is also honoured in Plectranthus hilliardiae Codd, Schizoglossum hilliardiae Kupicha, Cymbopappus hilliardiae B.Nord., Agalmyla hilliardiae D.J.Middleton & S.M.Scott and Helichrysum hilliardiae Wild.

== Works ==
- Hilliard, OM, BL Burtt 1971. Streptocarpus: an African Plant Study
- Hilliard, OM. 1983. Flora of Southern Africa Series. Ed. Balogh Scientific Books. 325 pp. ISBN 0-621-07943-X
- Hilliard, OM, BL Burtt 1985. A Revision of Geranium in Africa south of the Limpopo. (Notes from the Royal Botanic Garden Edinburgh. Vol. XLII no. 2)
- Hilliard, OM. 1987. The Botany of the Southern Natal Drakensberg (Annals of Kirstenbosch Botanic Gardens) Ed. National Botanic Gardens. 253 pp. ISBN 0-620-10625-5
- Hilliard, OM, BL Burtt 1991. Dierama: The Hairbells of Africa. Ed. Timber Press, Inc. 152 pp. ISBN 1-874802-01-7
- Hilliard, OM. 1995. The Manuleae: A Tribe of Scrophulariaceae. Ed. Edinburgh University Press. 600 pp. ISBN 0-7486-0489-8
- Hilliard, OM, LS Davis (illustrator). 1997. Trees & Shrubs of Natal (Ukhahlamba). Ed. Univ. of Kwazulu Natal Press; 2ª ed. 48 pp. ISBN 0-86980-882-6
- Hilliard, OM. 1997. Flowers of the Natal Drakensberg: The Lily, Iris And Orchid Family And Their Allies (Ukhahlamba S.) Ed. Univ. of Kwazulu Natal Press. 85 pp. ISBN 0-86980-702-1
