= Wilby, Missouri =

- Unincorporated community
- Location within Missouri Location within the United States
- Coordinates: 36°52′15″N 90°26′23″W
- Country: United States
- State: Missouri
- County: Butler
- Elevation: 361 ft (110 m)
- Time zone: UTC-6 (Central (CST))
  - Summer (DST): UTC-5 (CDT)
- Area code: 573
- GNIS feature ID: 752883

Wilby is an unincorporated community in northern Butler County, in the U.S. state of Missouri. The community is on Missouri Route O approximately seven miles north of Poplar Bluff. It sits on the east margin of the Black River floodplain at an elevation of 361 feet. The community of Hilliard lies three miles to the south-southeast along the Black River. The Missouri Pacific Railway passes the west side of the community along the Black River floodplain. The community lies within the Mark Twain National Forest. Powers Creek flows north of the community.

The community was most likely named after Wilby, a railroad employee.
