= National Register of Historic Places listings in Madison County, Missouri =

Location of Madison County in Missouri

This is a list of the National Register of Historic Places listings in Madison County, Missouri.

This is intended to be a complete list of the properties and districts on the National Register of Historic Places in Madison County, Missouri, United States. Latitude and longitude coordinates are provided for many National Register properties and districts; these locations may be seen together in a map.

There are 5 properties and districts listed on the National Register in the county.

This National Park Service list is complete through NPS recent listings posted December 12, 2025.

== Current listings ==
	Name on the Register	Image	Date listed	Location	City or town	Description
1	Fredericktown Courthouse Square Historic District	Fredericktown Courthouse Square Historic District	July 8, 2009 (#09000503)	110-145 E. Main St., 106-125 W. Main St., 110-120 S. Main St., and Court Square; 37°33′35″N 90°17′30″W	Fredericktown	
2	Fredericktown Missouri Pacific Railroad Depot	Fredericktown Missouri Pacific Railroad Depot	February 10, 2000 (#00000088)	406 Villar St. 37°33′52″N 90°17′30″W	Fredericktown	
3	Fredericktown United States Post Office	Fredericktown United States Post Office	October 8, 2009 (#09000814)	155 S. Main St. 37°33′31″N 90°17′40″W	Fredericktown	
4	Madison County Courthouse	Madison County Courthouse	December 28, 2000 (#00001548)	1 Courthouse Sq. 37°33′34″N 90°17′40″W	Fredericktown	
5	St. Louis, Iron Mountain and Southern Railroad Depot		October 19, 2005 (#05001178)	Allen St., 150 feet (46 m) north of its junction with Kelly St. 37°34′03″N 90°17′35″W	Fredericktown	

== See also ==
- List of National Historic Landmarks in Missouri
- National Register of Historic Places listings in Missouri
