= Saint Michael Township, Madison County, Missouri =

Township in the U.S. state of Missouri

Saint Michael Township is a township in Madison County, Missouri, in the United States.

== Name ==
St. Michael Township's name derives from the town of St. Michel which was an earlier settlement located at present-day Fredericktown, Missouri.

== History ==
St. Michael Township is one of the three original townships which were created in 1818 at the time of Madison county's establishment and lies in the western part of Madison County. It was named after the oldest settlement in Madison County, St. Michel (founded 1802), today known as Fredericktown. St. Michael Township was preserved when the county was redistricted in 1845. However, its boundaries were altered in 1846 and again in 1857 when another township – Polk Township – was added to the county, and then once again in 1909 when Mine La Motte Township was established. St. Michael Township contains three communities: Cobalt, Fredericktown and Junction.

== Demographics ==
=== 2000 census ===
As of the census of 2000, there were 6,671 people, 31 households, and 23 families residing in the township. The population density was 125 inhabitants per square mile (48/km^{2}). There were 41 housing units at an average density of 321.2 per square mile (124.0/km^{2}). The racial makeup of the town was 97.9% White, 0.4% Asian, 0.1% African American, 0.2% Native American, 0.01% Pacific Islander, 0.1% from other races, and 0.7% from two or more races. There were 2,740 households, out of which 45.2% had children under the age of 18 living with them, 41.4% were married couples living together.

== GNIS reference ==
This township is recorded in the Geographic Names Information System (GNIS) under the name "Saint Michael" at location 37°32′43″N 90°17′35″W.
