= Village Creek (Missouri) =

Stream in the U.S. state of Missouri

Village Creek is a stream in Madison County in the U.S. state of Missouri. It is a tributary of the Little Saint Francis River.

The stream headwaters arise just south of the Madison - St Francois county line at 37.6°N 90.3°W and an elevation of 1020 feet. The stream flows south past the mine workings and Mine La Motte then turns southwest to pass just north of Junction City and to its confluence with the Little Saint Francis at 37°33′57″N 90°18′33″W (elevation: 606 ft.) northwest of Fredericktown.

Village Creek was so named for the fact it flowed past the original town site of Saint Michel village.

Shays Creek flows into this creek.

== See also ==
- List of rivers of Missouri
