= Bain Hill =

Summit in the US state of Missouri

- Location within Missouri Location within the United States

Highest point
- Elevation: 1,016 ft (310 m)
- Prominence: 154 ft (47 m)
- Coordinates: 37.672492°N 90.293056°W

Geography
- Location: Missouri, United States
- Parent range: St Francois Mountains
- Topo map: USGS Knob Lick

Bain Hill is a summit in St. Francois County, Missouri. It has a peak elevation of 1,106 feet (337 m). The hill rises to the east of and about 200 feet above the Little St. Francis River. Knob Lick lies about four miles to the west and Mine La Motte is about five miles to the south in Madison County.

Bain Hill has the name of Peter Bains, the original owner of the site.
