= KYLS (AM) =

Radio station in Fredericktown, Missouri

- Fredericktown, Missouri; United States
- Broadcast area: Farmington, Missouri
- Frequency: 1450 kHz
- Branding: K94.3

Programming
- Format: Classic hits
- Affiliations: Fox News Radio

Ownership
- Owner: Dockins Broadcast Group, LLC
- Sister stations: KPWB; KPWB-FM; KYLS-FM

History
- First air date: June 29, 1963 (as KFTW)
- Last air date: February 2026
- Former call signs: KFTW (1963–1997)

Technical information
- Licensing authority: FCC
- Facility ID: 39584
- Class: C
- Power: 1,000 watts unlimited
- Transmitter coordinates: 37.58362°N 90.29177°W
- Translator: 94.3 K232FS (Fredericktown)

Links
- Public license information: Public file; LMS
- Webcast: Listen Live
- Website: www.myk94.com

KYLS (1450 kHz) was an AM radio station licensed to Fredericktown, Missouri. It broadcast at 1,000 watts and last aired a classic hits format that was branded as "K94.3", reflecting its simulcast on an FM translator at 94.3 MHz (K232FS). KYLS was owned by Dockins Broadcast Group, LLC.

== History ==
The station began broadcasting on June 29, 1963, and originally held the call sign KFTW. Its call sign was changed to KYLS on August 11, 1997. It adopted a hot adult contemporary format branded "K-Hits 94.3" in 2018.

By 2025, KYLS had switched to classic hits under the branding "K94.3". Dockins surrendered the KYLS license in February 2026. It was cancelled on February 25, 2026.
