= Musco Creek =

Stream in the U.S. state of Missouri

Musco Creek is a stream in Madison and St. Francois counties in the U.S. state of Missouri. It is a tributary of the Little Saint Francis River.

The stream headwaters arise in St. Francois County north of Knob Lick and it flows generally south passing just west of Knob Lick. It flows roughly parallel to US Route 67 and enters Madison County. It enters the Little Saint Francis about two miles west of Mine La Motte.

The source area is at 37°42′11″N 90°21′06″W and the confluence is at 37°36′47″N 90°19′43″W.

Musco was named after a local Indian settler, according to local history.

== See also ==
- List of rivers of Missouri
