= Castor Township, Madison County, Missouri =

Inactive township in the US state of Missouri

Coordinates: 37.5467°N 90.1792°W

Castor Township is an inactive township in Madison County, in the U.S. state of Missouri.

Castor Township was established in 1818, taking its name from the Castor River.

Combs Branch and Hackle Creek flow through the township.
