= Millcreek, Missouri =

Unincorporated community in Missouri, U.S.

Coordinates: 37°31′36″N 90°18′35″W

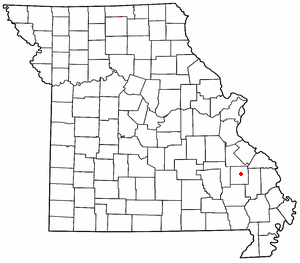

Millcreek is an unincorporated community in Castor Township in Madison County, Missouri, United States. It is located on Mill Creek, just east of U.S. Route 67, approximately three miles south of Fredericktown.

A post office called Millcreek was established in 1909, and remained in operation until 1976. The community took its name from nearby Mill Creek.
