= Rock Creek (Little St. Francis River tributary) =

Stream in the U.S. state of Missouri

Rock Creek is a southwest flowing stream in Madison and St. Francois counties in the U.S. state of Missouri. It is a tributary of the Little Saint Francis River.

The stream headwaters arise in southeast St. Francois County at 37°39′35″N 90°14′07″W and the confluence with the Little Saint Francis is in northern Madison County at 37°38′14″N 90°18′25″W at an elevation of 768 feet (234 m).

The stream is impounded as Deer Run Lake on the border between St. Francois and Madison counties just upstream from its confluence and about two miles north of Mine La Motte.

Rock Creek was so named on account of large rocks on its course.

== See also ==
- List of rivers of Missouri
