= Silver Mine, Missouri =

Unincorporated community in Missouri, U.S.

Coordinates: 37°33′25″N 90°29′06″W

Silver Mine is an unincorporated community in northwest Madison County, in the U.S. state of Missouri.

The community is on Missouri Route D about five miles southwest of Oak Grove on US Route 72. The Silver Mine Recreation Area on the St. Francois River is two miles (3.2 km) east. Ironton is about 7.5 miles (12 km) to the west-northwest and Fredericktown is about 10 miles (16 km) to the east.

== History ==
A variant name was "Einstein Silver Mine". A post office called Einstein Silver Mines was established in 1879, the name was changed to Silver Mine in 1892, and the post office closed in 1955. The community, as well as nearby Silver Mountain, were named for a silver mine near the original town site.
