= KPWB =

KPWB may refer to:

- KPWB (AM), a radio station (1140 AM) licensed to Piedmont, Missouri, United States
- KFDS-FM, a radio station (101.9 FM, previously 104.9 FM) licensed to Marquand, Missouri, United States, which used the call sign KPWB-FM from 1985 to 2026
- KCWI-TV, a television station (channel 23) licensed to Ames, Iowa, United States, which used the call sign KPWB-TV from June 1998 to September 2006
- KMAX-TV, a television station (channel 31) licensed to Sacramento, California, United States, which used the call sign KPWB-TV while affiliated with The WB Television Network from 1995 to 1998.
