= Wills Branch =

Stream in the US state of Missouri

Wills Branch is a stream in Madison and St. Francois counties in the U.S. state of Missouri. It is a tributary of the Little St. Francis River.

The stream headwaters arise in St. Francois County at 37°42′08″N 90°20′46″W at an elevation of approximately 1,060 ft (320 m). The stream flows south-southeast passing under Missouri Route DD two miles northeast of Knob Lick. It is impounded as Nims Lake on the St Francois-Madison county line and enters the Little St. Francis River in Madison County approximately three-quarters of a mile southeast of the Nims Lake dam. The confluence is at 37°37′46″N 90°19′08″W at an elevation of 764 ft (233 m).

Wills Branch has the name of a black settler in the area.

== See also ==
- List of rivers of Missouri
