= KYLS =

KYLS may refer to:

- KYLS (AM), a radio station (1450 AM) licensed to Fredericktown, Missouri, United States
- KYLS-FM, a radio station (95.9 FM) licensed to Ironton, Missouri, United States
