= Faro, Missouri =

Unincorporated community in Missouri, U.S.

- Unincorporated community
- Location within Missouri
- Coordinates: 37°26′50″N 90°26′15″W
- Country: United States
- State: Missouri
- County: Madison
- Elevation: 584 ft (178 m)
- Time zone: UTC-6 (Central (CST))
  - Summer (DST): UTC-5 (CDT)
- Area code: 573
- GNIS feature ID: 749903

Faro is an unincorporated community in Twelvemile Township in Madison County, Missouri, United States. The community was located on Captain Creek, approximately one mile northeast of the St. Francis River. The community site is located on Missouri Route O between Arnett Mountain to the north and Rock Pile Mountain to the south.

A post office called Faro was established in 1905, and remained in operation until 1942. Faro is believed to be an invented name which holds no special significance.
