= Fredericktown Courthouse Square Historic District =

Historic district in Missouri, United States

- U.S. National Register of Historic Places
- U.S. Historic district
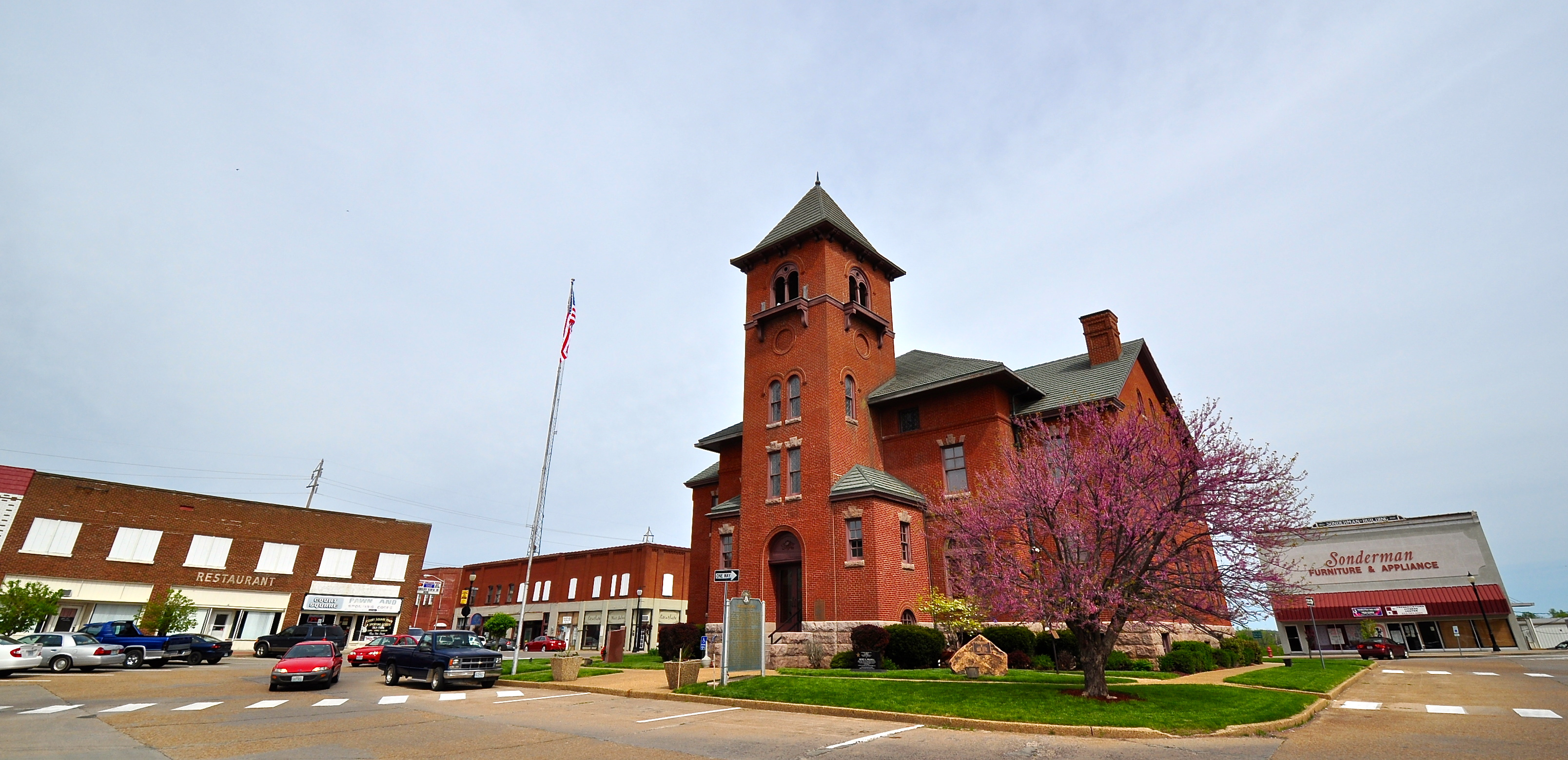
- Fredericktown Courthouse Square Historic District, April 2014

- Location within Missouri Location within the United States
- Location: 110-145 E. Main St., 106-125 W. Main St., 110-120 S. Main St. and Court Square, Fredericktown, Missouri
- Coordinates: 37°33′34″N 90°17′39″W
- Area: 9.3 acres (3.8 ha)
- Architect: Link, Theodore C.; et al.
- Architectural style: Renaissance, Italianate
- NRHP reference No.: 09000503
- Added to NRHP: July 8, 2009

Fredericktown Courthouse Square Historic District is a national historic district located at Fredericktown, Madison County, Missouri. The district encompasses 26 contributing buildings in the central business district of Fredericktown. It developed between about 1819 and 1958, and includes representative examples of Renaissance Revival, Italianate, and Art Deco style architecture. Located in the district is the separately listed Madison County Courthouse designed by Theodore Link. Other notable buildings include the Old Livery (c. 1845), I.O.O.F. Hall (c. 1890), Masonic Hall (1913), Madison Hotel (c. 1915), and Democrat News (c. 1913).

It was listed on the National Register of Historic Places in 2009.
