= Libertyville, Missouri =

Unincorporated community in the US state of Missouri

Coordinates: 37°42′13″N 90°17′17″W

Libertyville is an unincorporated community in southeastern St. Francois County, in the U.S. state of Missouri. The community is located on Missouri Route DD, east of Knob Lick and north of Mine La Motte. The village is situated at the headwaters of the Little Saint Francis River.

== History ==
A post office called Libertyville was established in 1863 and remained in operation until 1919. The community most likely takes its name from Liberty Township. Variant names were "Kinkead" and "Liberty Meeting House".
