= Slater Branch =

Stream in the American state of Missouri

Coordinates: 37.551442°N 90.360119°W

Slater Branch is a stream in Madison County in the U.S. state of Missouri. It is a tributary of the Little Saint Francis River.

The identity of the namesake Slater is unknown.

== See also ==
- List of rivers of Missouri
