= Higdon =

Higdon may refer to:

== People ==
- Allan Higdon (born 1947), mayor of Ottawa, Canada
- Greg Higdon (born 1947), American politician from Kentucky
- Hal Higdon (born 1931), American writer and runner
- Jennifer Higdon (born 1962), American composer and composition teacher
- Jimmy Higdon (born 1953), American politician from Kentucky
- Karan Higdon (born 1996), American football player
- Michael Higdon (born 1983), English footballer
- Ranulf Higdon (1280–1364), English chronicler and monk

== Places ==
- Higdon, Alabama, United States
- Higdon, Missouri, United States

== See also ==
- Higden
