= Whitener Creek =

Stream in the U.S. state of Missouri

Whitener Creek is a stream in western Bollinger and southeastern Madison counties in the U.S. state of Missouri. It is a tributary of the Castor River.

The stream headwaters arise in Bollinger County north of Missouri Route A at 37°27′02″N 90°08′15″W. The stream flows to the west and south-southwest into Madison County roughly parallel to Route A. It flows through Marquand and enters the Castor River just west of Marquand. at 37°25′35″N 90°10′12″W.

Whitener Creek has the name of Henry Whitener, a pioneer settler.

== See also ==
- List of rivers of Missouri
