= Shays Creek =

Stream in the American state of Missouri

Coordinates: 37°34′58″N 90°17′11″W

Shays Creek is a stream in northeastern Madison County in the U.S. state of Missouri. It is a tributary of Village Creek.

Shays Creek bears the name of a pioneer citizen.

== See also ==
- List of rivers of Missouri
