= James Caldwell (Missouri speaker) =

American politician

1st Speaker of the Missouri House of Representatives
- In office 1821–1822
- Preceded by: Office established
- Succeeded by: Henry S. Geyer

Member of the Missouri Senate
- In office 1822–1824

Member of the Missouri House of Representatives
- In office 1821–1822

Member of the Kentucky House of Representatives
- In office 1800–1807

Personal details
- Born: James Caldwell; July 4, 1763 Augusta County, Virginia, U.S.
- Died: September 6, 1836 (aged 73) Libertyville, Missouri, U.S.
- Resting place: Parkview Cemetery; Farmington, Missouri, U.S.
- Party: Democratic-Republican
- Spouse: Meeke Parrin

James Caldwell (July 4, 1763 – September 6, 1836) was an American politician and slaveowner who served as the first Speaker of the Missouri House of Representatives.

Caldwell was born in Virginia. During the American Revolutionary War he served under Archibald Woods and Thomas Wright. In 1781, Caldwell moved to Lincoln County, Kentucky where he served under William Whitley in the American Indian Wars.

In 1786, he married Meeke Perrin in Lincoln County. He served in the Kentucky General Assembly from Harrison County, Kentucky from 1800 to 1807.

In 1810, the Caldwells moved to Libertyville, Missouri, in Sainte Genevieve County. Their settlement became part of Saint Francois County upon its creation in 1821.

He was elected to the Missouri Territorial Legislature in 1812, and served there until Missouri gained statehood in 1821. He was then elected to the Missouri House of Representatives, and was named the Speaker.

In 1822, Caldwell was elected to the Missouri State Senate. He lost re-election in 1824 to his son-in-law James Kerr.

Caldwell died in Libertyville, Missouri on September 6, 1836. Most of his slaves were released upon his death. He is buried at Parkview Cemetery in Farmington, Missouri.

| Preceded by None | Speaker of the Missouri House of Representatives; 1820– 1821 | Succeeded by Henry S. Geyer |
