= French Mills =

French Mills or French's Mills may refer to:

- French Mills, Missouri, U.S.A.
- French Mills, New York
- Fort Covington, New York, originally called French Mills.

== See also ==
- French's Mill, in West Virginia
