= Tin Mountain, Missouri =

Unincorporated community in Missouri, U.S.

Coordinates: 37°31′29″N 90°24′32″W

Tin Mountain is an unincorporated community in Madison County, in the U.S. state of Missouri.

The community took its name from nearby Tin Mine Mountain.
