= Hackle Creek =

Stream in the American state of Missouri

Hackle Creek (also called Hacker Creek) is a stream in eastern Madison County in the U.S. state of Missouri. It is a tributary of Henderson Creek.

The stream headwaters arise about four miles southeast of Fredericktown and it flows east to its confluence with Henderson Creek about one-half mile northwest of Cornwall. The source is at 37°30′50″N 90°14′38″W and the confluence is at 37°30′59″N 90°12′45″W.

Hackle Creek derives its name from the local Hacker family, the original owners of the site.

== See also ==
- List of rivers of Missouri
