= List of killings by law enforcement officers in the United States, March 2026 =

This is a list of people reported killed by non-military law enforcement officers in the United States in March 2026, whether in the line of duty or not, and regardless of reason or method. The listing documents the occurrence of a death, making no implications regarding wrongdoing or justification on the part of the person killed or officer involved. Killings are arranged by date of the incident that caused death. Different death dates, if known, are noted in the description. The table below lists 118 people.

== March 2026 ==
| Date | Name (age) of deceased | Race | Location | Description |
|---|---|---|---|---|
| 2026-03-31 | John Rackovan III (46) | White | Barr Township, Pennsylvania | State Police attempted to serve a warrant on a man at a home before being fired upon. Troopers returned fire, killing him. |
| 2026-03-31 | Robert S. Gordon (38) | White | Columbus, Ohio | A caller told police that an irate man was armed with a gun in the city's north side. CPD arrived and commanded the man to drop the gun before officers fatally shot him. The footage was released. |
| 2026-03-31 | Ryan Jacob LeCompte (39) | White | Pinellas Park, Florida | Police respond to a report of a man armed with an AR-15–style rifle, screamed profanities, and threatened to kill another man, who was a landscaper. After LeCompte grabbed his gun in his house, he pointed the gun at the landscaper, who was inside his truck. As officers arrived, the man rushed back inside the house. Pinellas Park officers attempted to communicate with him, but the man remained barricaded inside his home. After communicating the man via text, he refused to come out. Officers used a mine-resistant ambush-protected vehicle, but LeCompte approached near the since-demolished door, and aimed a different gun, a shotgun, at the officers. Two officers fired back at LeCompte, striking him. LeCompte was taken to Bayfront Hospital, where he was pronounced deceased. |
| 2026-03-31 | Charles Zearbaugh (76) | White | Muncie, Indiana | Zearbaugh pointed a handgun at the first MPD officer who responded to a call about his erratic behavior before barricading himself. Police shot him after they deployed chemical agent inside his home. |
| 2026-03-31 | Kevin McAlister (29) | Unknown | Shenandoah, Virginia | A Page County Sheriff's deputy was responding to a call in the Naked Creek area of Shenandoah during the early afternoon hours, when they observed someone who was wanted on a capias warrant. A foot pursuit started after the officer got out of his vehicle. McAlister, from Elkton, Virginia, brandished a weapon while running. After repeated commands, the officer fatally shot him. |
| 2026-03-31 | Matthew Ryan Cross (32) | White | Port Charlotte, Florida | Cross was a homicide suspect in an initial incident. During the search, bicycle patrol officers received a report about a man pointing a gun at the caller in a woods, later identified as Cross. When patrol officers entered the Woods, Cross began firing at them. When assisting North Port Police and Charlotte County deputies arrived and encountered Cross, Cross pointed the gun at them before being shot dead by seven officers. |
| 2026-03-30 | Ammarin Tunstall (35) | Black | Monroeville, Alabama | Tunstall was captured on camera being dragged by Monroeville officers after being taken into custody. He later died. MPD said Tunstall was arrested without incident but refused to walk after they responded to a domestic disturbance. The family disputed the statement, indicating that Tunstall was tased and pepper sprayed before losing consciousness. |
| 2026-03-30 | Michael W. Decker (53) | White | Steubenville, Ohio | The incident unfolded when Decker shot at a Harrison County deputy. OHP troopers later pursued Decker before utilizing a tire deflation device to end the chase. Decker shot at law enforcement again and fled into the nearby woods. Another confrontation ensued when troopers located him, during which, troopers shot him. The footage was released. |
| 2026-03-30 | Demetric Bryant (25) | Black | Indianola, Mississippi | A U.S. Marshal shot and killed a suspect with a weapon, after Marshals attempted to make contact with suspect, who was wanted on a warrant for rape. |
| 2026-03-29 | Ray Hunt (71) | Unknown | Sumter County, South Carolina | During a domestic disturbance investigation, A Sumter County deputy found Hunt armed with a gun and a woman who was shot. After being commanded to drop it, he instead struck the woman and then opened fire at the deputy. The deputy fired back. Hunt died a month later. |
| 2026-03-29 | Cassondra M. Scott (50) | Unknown | Hutchinson, Kansas | Scott allegedly pointed her pellet rifle at the officers, causing an officer to shoot, striking her. She was sent to the hospital where she later died. |
| 2026-03-29 | Michael Sims (71) | White | Connersville, Indiana | Fayette County sheriff's deputies responded to the scene, they encountered Sims with a gun inside the home before they shot and killed him, after Sims allegedly pointed his gun at victims and officers. |
| 2026-03-28 | Izaiah Ismael Tacoronte (20) | Black | Greeley, Colorado | Greeley police officers shot a man who charged at them with a knife after they responded to a call regarding the man. An officer was injured. |
| 2026-03-28 | Micah Bonin (43) | White | Anchorage, Alaska | APD responded to reports of gunshots. When officers arrived, the suspect barricaded himself in the residence and fired at them with a high powered rifle and later shot at the police drone. A single officer fired shots at the suspect in response. Shortly after the shooting, the house engulfed in fire. After the fire was put out, the suspect was found dead inside. The footage was released. |
| 2026-03-28 | David Hammond (68) | Unknown | St. Louis, Missouri | In the Dutchtown neighborhood, a 68-year-old man, who was wanted for 10 felony warrants for his arrest, attempted to flee from the officers on his bicycle before he fell off and was detained. The man suffered a cardiac arrest at the hospital and was pronounced dead. |
| 2026-03-27 | Victor L. Craighead (47) | Black | Diana, New York | A New York State Police trooper arrived at a trespassing complaint after the homeowner, who was away, saw through a security camera a person trespassing on their property, claiming that he was armed with a long gun. They discovered a burned-out vehicle nearby with remains of a person inside. Another burning vehicle was discovered, also with remains of another person. Officers arrived at a nearby home when Craighead came out of the residence with a long gun and fired at troopers. One trooper fired back at him, killing Craighead on-scene. |
| 2026-03-27 | Adam Bean (42) | White | Hope Mills, North Carolina | An off-duty law enforcement officer shot another officer, Captain Adam Bean. |
| 2026-03-27 | Rashawn Tucker (22) | Unknown | Paducah, Kentucky | Tucker was shot and killed by a Kentucky State Police officer after he allegedly stabbed an officer with a knife at a residence. |
| 2026-03-27 | Katelyn Hall (28) | Black | Louisville, Kentucky | LMPD responded to a home for a call regarding a woman in mental health crisis, armed with an edged weapon, who also had self-inflicted injuries. Upon arrival, officers found a woman who locked herself in a bathroom. At some point after the door was breached, the woman allegedly charged at them with a sharp object before two officers opened fire. The footage was released. |
| 2026-03-27 | Sandra Strampher Perry (72) | Unknown | Oklahoma City, Oklahoma | OCPD responded to a report of an armed woman. When they approached, the woman took off in a vehicle, prompting a chase. OHP later joined the chase and performed a PIT maneuver on the vehicle, disabling it. An armed confrontation ensued leading law enforcement to shoot her. Another person involved was also injured. |
| 2026-03-27 | Sayed Mousavi (29) | Asian | Murray, Utah | A suspect who was driving recklessly rear-ended a UHP trooper. The trooper initiated a traffic stop on the highway but the suspect stopped in the middle of the road. When they exited their vehicles, the suspect allegedly pulled out a knife before the trooper shot him. |
| 2026-03-27 | John Correll Montue (68) | Unknown | Sacramento, California | An officer pulled over the suspect's vehicle and then shot and killed a suspect at the scene in Old North Sacramento. |
| 2026-03-27 | unidentified male | Unknown | South Houston, Texas | A man refused to pull over for a traffic stop, leading to a pursuit across town that ended in his driveway. The man shot an officer in the head with a shotgun; the officer was sent to Memorial Hermann Medical Center. Officers fired their weapons in response, killing the man. |
| 2026-03-26 | James Lewis, Jr. (32) | Unknown | Chillum, Maryland | A man was pulled over for a traffic stop, being told to step out the car during the search. When a second officer arrived, the man jumped back into the car and proceeded to drove away with an officer partially on board. The officer fired his weapon, fatally striking the man before the car crashed into the pole. |
| 2026-03-26 | Lafimmas Leevon Haynes (38) | Black | New Orleans, Louisiana | A man shot two people outside the Tulane School of Medicine. A campus officer fatally shot him. The two victims are in critical condition. |
| 2026-03-25 | Duane Holston (53) | White | Fruitland Park, Florida | A man crashed into a home garage before exiting the vehicle with a hatchet in one hand. When FPPD arrived and ordered him to stop, he reportedly reached for a firearm when officers opened fire, killing him. |
| 2026-03-25 | Andrew W. Krasnansky (37) | White | Lower Saucon Township, Pennsylvania | A man was shot and killed after a four-hour standoff with the Pennsylvania State Police Special Emergency Response Team (SERT) that started off as a normal welfare check. Authorities confirmed that Krasnansky was experiencing a mental health crisis at the time of the shooting. |
| 2026-03-25 | Bara'Atef Mohammad AlQudah | Arab | Houston, Texas | HPD responded to a report of a man walking while having a handgun put inside a purse in the Gulfton neighborhood. When an officer instructed the man to put down the purse, the man shot at the officer before the two exchanged fire. The man then ran to an apartment where another shootout with police occurred. The officer was injured and the man was fatally shot.The footage was released. |
| 2026-03-25 | Jazz Joseph Fernandez (24) | Black | Castle Hills, Texas | Fernandez was armed with one or more knives before being shot by a Castle Hills police officer after dispatched to a hit-and-run crash. |
| 2026-03-24 | unidentified | Unknown | Cobalt, Missouri | Madison County deputies responded to a disturbance and found the suspect drove away. A brief pursuit ensued after the suspect refused to stop during an attempted traffic stop. The suspect eventually exited the vehicle and pointed a gun at deputies before they opened fire. |
| 2026-03-24 | Zakar Jeffrey (33) | Black | Des Moines, Iowa | During a welfare check, a man reportedly tried to an attack the father before charging toward an officer. Officers shot and killed him. When they entered the apartment, they found a homicide victim. |
| 2026-03-24 | James Lee (50) | Unknown | Tallahassee, Florida | Leon County deputies responded to a home to assist EMS. When they arrived, they found Lee holding a woman against her will. They tried to intervene but Lee reportedly waved a knife at them. The officers tased him in response. Lee was taken into custody and lost consciousness shortly after. He was sent to a hospital where he was pronounced dead. |
| 2026-03-24 | Christopher Lee Johnston (48) | White | Batesville, Arkansas | Independence County deputies were dispatched to a home on March 23 for a reported shooting. Upon arrival, the found two people suffering from gunshot wounds, on of whom later succumbed to their injuries. Police later conducted a search on Johnston, the suspected shooter, who was found in a wooded area near the crime scene the next morning. Department of Corrections K9 Unit shot and killed him in a confrontation. |
| 2026-03-24 | Reginald Thomas (44) | Black | Dayton, Ohio | According to Dayton Police Department News Conference, an officer tries to stop Thomas for having his bike without a front light, Thomas tries to flee from the officer then he pulled his gun twice. Despite the life-saving measures, He was sent to the hospital where he was pronounced dead later on. |
| 2026-03-23 | unidentified male | Unknown | Gretna, Louisiana | An inmate was arrested on March 20 for traffic violations and court-related issues. On March 23, he was ordered to be transferred to the correctional center's infirmary for treatment. During transport, the inmate reportedly became aggressive and grabbed a taser from one of them before deploying it. Corrections officers eventually used force to handcuff him. The inmate later lost consciousness and died four days later. |
| 2026-03-23 | Kamla Grimmer (53) | Unknown | Palm Bay, Florida | Palm Bay Police responded to a home for reports about loud music. Upon arrival, a woman shot at them from the residence. Officers set up a perimeter until SWAT arrived. The woman proceeded to shot at officers again before they returned fire. Despite negotiation efforts, the woman shot at them for the third time and SWAT officers shot her. They found her dead inside the home. |
| 2026-03-23 | Zachary Beaudet (22) | White | Westminster, Massachusetts | WPD responded to a home to arrest a man. The man reportedly moved toward them with a knife before being shot. |
| 2026-03-22 | Edward Dewayne "Wayne" Reynolds (69) | White | Hazard, Kentucky | A trooper who was responded to an emergency call in a cruiser struck a vehicle that turned left at an intersection. The driver and a female passenger were killed. |
| 2026-03-22 | Christa "Tina" Slone (50) | White | Hazard, Kentucky | A trooper who was responded to an emergency call in a cruiser struck a vehicle that turned left at an intersection. The driver and a female passenger were killed. |
| 2026-03-22 | Jonathan Aaron McElroy (34) | Black | Hephzibah, Georgia | During a domestic violence investigation, Richmond County deputies attempted to arrest McElroy. McElroy was non-compliant, leading deputies to deploy a taser. McElroy lost consciousness shortly after and died at a hospital. |
| 2026-03-22 | Devon Harper (29) | White | Natchez, Mississippi | An off-duty NPD officer struck and killed a pedestrian with his vehicle. |
| 2026-03-22 | unidentified male (40s) | Unknown | Sandy, Utah | Police were called to a home for a domestic investigation. Two officers shot and killed a man after he allegedly pulled out a weapon and charged at them. |
| 2026-03-22 | unidentified | Unknown | Bowie, Texas | Bowie Police shot and killed a suspect. Few details were immediately released. |
| 2026-03-22 | Dustin Johnson (41) | White | Amarillo, Texas | Johnson shot and killed two people at a storage facility during a suspected robbery. After evading police, Johnson drove into a home and opened fire, killing a third person and injuring five. Responding officers killed Johnson in a shoot-out. Johnson had an extensive criminal history dating back to 2004 after beating a man with a club, and pleading guilty the following year in 2005 for tampering with evidence after fleeing. |
| 2026-03-21 | Harvey Franklin Hardy (52) | White | Cameron, North Carolina | Police responded to a report about Hardy firing a gun at driving cars. When Moore County Police arrived, Hardy fled and a deputy chased after him. Hardy then reportedly fired at the deputy before being struck by returned fire. |
| 2026-03-21 | unidentified male | Unknown | Weed, California | A Mount Shasta officer pulled a motorist over. During the stop, an officer found methamphetamine in the vehicle. An officer shot the driver after he allegedly pointed a gun at the officer. |
| 2026-03-20 | Roel Contreras (46) | Unknown | San Elizario, Texas | El Paso County deputies responded to a report of a man acting erratically, yelling and climbing into yards and attempting to enter properties. When they located him and checked on him, he became combative. Deputies used force to detain him and put restraints on him. He lost consciousness and later died. |
| 2026-03-20 | unidentified male | Unknown | Corona, California | CPD responded to an apartment complex and shot a knife-wielding man. A woman was found stabbed to death inside. |
| 2026-03-20 | unidentified male | Unknown | Everett, Washington | Snohomish County deputies located a man shooting near an elementary school and shot him dead after he approached them. Tasers were deployed but unsuccessful. |
| 2026-03-19 | Christopher M. Rose (46) | Unknown | Irvine, Kentucky | Estill County deputies and Irvine officers attempted to serve a search and arrest warrant on Rose at a residence when he fired at them. They returned fire and killed Rose. |
| 2026-03-19 | Ashlyn Brownell (31) | White | Longmont, Colorado | LPD responded to a residence for a suicidal woman. Upon arrival, the woman fired a gun at the garage. Despite negotiating efforts urging her to surrender, at some point, the woman came out the garage and brandished a gun before being shot. |
| 2026-03-19 | Kevin Odom (41) | Unknown | Thackerville, Oklahoma | Police received a call about a suicidal Burleson, Texas man at Thackerville's WinStar World Casino. When Chickasaw Lighthorse officers arrived, they shot and killed a subject. |
| 2026-03-19 | Dakota Levi Simmons (24) | Unknown | Gainesville, Georgia | A man shot a GPD officer after police responded to a call about a woman fearing for her life. After a six hours standoff, the suspect fired more shots before being struck by returned fire. |
| 2026-03-19 | Fallus Williams (42) | Unknown | Harrison County, Mississippi | Harrison County deputies responded to a domestic violence call and found a vehicle involved in the incident. The female driver reportedly tried to run them over before being shot and killed. |
| 2026-03-19 | Nathan Poulakos (41) | White | Summit, Waukesha County, Wisconsin | Waukesha County deputies responded to a pursuit after a suspect entered Waukesha County from Jefferson County. A deputy initiated a traffic stop on the car but the suspect fled. After another chase, the suspect's vehicle was left disabled in a field. The suspect subsequently exited the vehicle with a gun. A deputy fatally shot him. |
| 2026-03-18 | Byron Hoover (60) | Unknown | Selma, Texas | SPD responded to shots fired reports and found Hoover, the suspect. Officers fatally shot him for unknown reasons. |
| 2026-03-18 | Sean R. Barry (25) | Unknown | Weymouth, Massachusetts | WPD shot and killed a man who lunged at them with a knife following a call for service. |
| 2026-03-18 | William Roberts (64) | Unknown | Roswell, New Mexico | A NMSP trooper attempted a traffic stop on a suspect but he fled. The chase later ended in a cul-de-sac, where a trooper ordered Roberts to show his hands. Roberts reportedly reached for a gun and pointed it at them. Troopers then fatally shot him. |
| 2026-03-17 | Justin Eric Hardin (45) | White | Cartersville, Georgia | Bartow County deputies and Bartow Cartersville Drug Task Force agents attempted to execute an arrest warrant at the Days Inn on Georgia State Route 20. Hardin, a Canton, Georgia resident, drove off from the initial stop and was pursued by deputies for a short distance. Deputies attempted to PIT Hardin's fifth-generation Toyota RAV4, under the overpass at the intersection of Interstate 75 and State Route 20. A 44-year-old Acworth, Georgia woman exited the passenger side of the vehicle and was taken into custody, but the man did not comply with commands to exit the Toyota. Deputies deployed OC spray into the Toyota to get Hardin out, but did not comply and deputies approached the vehicle. One deputy broke the driver's side window to remove him, but Hardin grabbed a gun and fired at deputies. Officers fatally shot Hardin, killing him on-scene. |
| 2026-03-17 | John F. Miller (57) | Black | Donora, Pennsylvania | Donora Borough Police officers tased a man after he fled when officers found out he had an outstanding DUI warrant. He fell on back and became unresponsive for five days before he died. |
| 2026-03-17 | Michael Krause Jr. (49) | White | Jacksonville, Florida | JSO officers responded to an armed robbery at a Gate Petroleum gas station next to Interstate 95 in the Greenfield Manor neighborhood. Krause Jr. reportedly threatened employees with a gun and made statements about self-harm. Once officers arrived, he threatened to shoot them before walking out the store and raising the gun at them. An officer then shot him with a rifle. |
| 2026-03-16 | unidentified male | Unknown | Cinebar, Washington | Two Lewis County deputies fatally shot a man in distress after refusing to drop his weapon. |
| 2026-03-16 | Lawrence Michels (51) | White | Jasper, Georgia | Michels shot and killed a Veterans Affairs employee at a clinic. Responding officers shot and killed the gunman. |
| 2026-03-16 | Susanne Clark (55) | White | Lacey Township, New Jersey | Officers responded to a call reporting a medical event. A responding officer shot and killed a woman after she allegedly approached an officer holding a knife. |
| 2026-03-15 | unidentified male (John Doe) | Unknown | Lancaster, California | LASD deputies responded to a shots fired call and were flagged down by three victims, who claimed the suspect had fired at them with a shotgun and two were struck by gunfire. When deputies requested airship and located the suspect behind a travel trailer, the suspect opened fire on them, resulting two shootouts at the area. The suspect was killed during the encounter. The incident seems to not be publicly released on social media. Police released the footage. |
| 2026-03-15 | Randy Ealy (45) | Unknown | Augusta, Arkansas | Woodruff County deputies responded to a disturbance at a home to assist Augusta Police. A deputy shot Ealy in the incident for reasons unknown. |
| 2026-03-15 | Eric B. Pottinger (44) | Unknown | Springdale, Wisconsin | Verona Police attempted to stop a stolen vehicle connected to a burglary. The pursuit ended in Springdale, where an officer shot the suspect, who was allegedly armed, during a scuffle. |
| 2026-03-15 | Justin Carl Schmidt (36) | Unknown | Phoenix, Arizona | Phoenix Police responded to a domestic fight at the Spinnaker Landing Apartments in the Santa Grande neighborhood. Upon arrival, they found a woman and a child trapped behind a locked back patio gate. After releasing them, police were informed that Schmidt, the suspect, had cocked a gun. A standoff ensued, during which, Schmidt shot down a drone and fired at officers from the window before they returned fire. SWAT team later found him dead inside. |
| 2026-03-14 | Leon Alex Davis (27) | Black | Federal Way, Washington | Police responded to a report of a disorderly man and were told that he was held down by an injured security guard in the hospital. Upon arrival, officers pinned him down, beat him, knelt on his limbs, and held him in a prone position for at least 25 to 35 minutes. They also placed a mesh "spit hood" over his head. Reports note that Davis repeatedly cried out that he could not breathe while several nurses and at least one doctor looked on. He became unresponsive and died of cardiac arrest in the hospital. On June 26, 2026, the King County Medical Examiner's Office officially ruled Davis’s death a homicide. His family had filed a 50 million tort claim against the city of Federal Way. |
| 2026-03-14 | unidentified | Unknown | Chambers County, Alabama | An Off-duty Chambers County deputy and an off-duty Valley police officer were involved in a crash. The deputy was seriously injured and another driver who initially sustained minor injuries died in a hospital few days later. |
| 2026-03-13 | Don Marlow (67) | Unknown | Granbury, Texas | Officers respond to a report of a man making threats to officers. He barricaded in his house for several hours until officers discovered him pointing a gun to a woman's head, prompting two Hood County deputies to fire their weapons, killing the man. |
| 2026-03-13 | Kristopher Hanks (42) | Unknown | Westlake, Louisiana | According to police, Calcasieu Parish deputies attempted to speak to a subject who was involved in an unspecified incident but the subject refused. The sheriff's office then learned that there were family members inside the residence and tried to negotiate with the subject again for several hours but was unsuccessful. At some point, the suspect fired at them before emerging from the residence with a gun. At which point, deputies shot and killed him on-scene. |
| 2026-03-13 | Jason Anthony Arrieta (40) | White | Phoenix, Arizona | Phoenix officers responded to a domestic violence call and found an Orange County, California man who began running through the Golden Key Apartments near the Osborn West Business Center area. As additional officers arrived, the man reportedly refused to drop the rifle he was carrying. The officers then fatally shot him. The footage was released by Phoenix Police Department. |
| 2026-03-12 | Darnell Wilson (50) | Black | Traverse City, Michigan | Police responded to a report of a domestic disturbance involving a knife. Officers found a man holding a knife and shot him when he allegedly ran towards them. |
| 2026-03-12 | Jonathan Otto (35) | White | Milwaukee, Wisconsin | When MPD officers in the Historic Mitchell Street neighborhood tried to stop Otto, who was in a white fifth-generation Dodge Ram 5500 HD Chassis Cab, for a parole violation, he reportedly attempted to flee. An officer was dragged by the Dodge for blocks before he fired and killed Otto. Otto was initially stopped for a parole violation. The footage was released. |
| 2026-03-12 | unidentified male | Unknown | Washington, District of Columbia | During a pursuit of a vehicle which fled a traffic stop, Park Police used spike strips on the vehicle. The vehicle kept speeding before crashing into the tree near the Inlet Bridge, killing the driver and injuring two passengers. |
| 2026-03-12 | unidentified male | Unknown | Phoenix, Arizona | Phoenix Police responded to a shooting and found a man who matched one of the suspects' description. The man reportedly got off the car and walked toward the officers while armed with a handgun. The officers shot him in response. Moments later, the man fell to the ground but held onto the gun and pointed it at one officer, leading officers to shoot him again. |
| 2026-03-12 | Jose Lara (38) | Hispanic | Fort Worth, Texas | A FWPD officer noticed a man leaning over a bridge with a broken glass bottle on Highway 287. When the officer ordered the man to get off the bridge. The man cut himself on the neck before charging toward the officer with the bottle. The officer subsequently shot him. The footage was released. |
| 2026-03-12 | Jedidiah D Guerra (39) | Unknown | Sparks, Nevada | Sparks Police officers and SWAT team responded to reports of a man who said he was going to “shoot up” a nearby business. At some point, they located the suspect's vehicle by ping pointing his cellphone. The suspect then released his dog before ramming into marked police vehicle with gun drawn. Officers shot him in response. Two officers were injured. It was determined that the initial 911 call was made by the suspect. The footage was released. |
| 2026-03-11 | unidentified male | Unknown | West Point, Wisconsin | Columbia County Sheriff's deputies responded to a residence for a hit-and-run investigation. When they contacted the subject on the phone, the subject indicated that he had a gun and barricaded himself inside, starting a standoff. The man eventually exited the residence and began approaching the deputies while pointing a long gun at them. After their commands were ignored, four deputies fatally shot him. |
| 2026-03-11 | unidentified male (30) | Unknown | Sweetwater, Florida | Four Sweetwater police officers responded to a domestic altercation call and found a pregnant woman and a man armed with a knife. They shot the man dead in a confrontation. The woman was taken to a hospital for apparent bruises. |
| 2026-03-11 | unidentified male | Unknown | Kerr County, Texas | A Gillespie County deputy conducted a traffic stop on a motorcycle but the motorcyclist failed to stop, leading to a pursuit. The chase ended on I-10 in Kerr County. The suspect reportedly pointed a gun at a deputy before being shot. The motorcycle was stolen from Canada, according to the Sheriff's Office. |
| 2026-03-11 | Diamon-Mazairre Robinson (39) | Black | Dallas, Texas | Robinson, known publicly as "Mike King", was wanted for impersonating a law enforcement officer, allegedly pretending to be one while running a business that provided off-duty police officers with work. SWAT officers located Robinson in a Children's Health hospital parking garage inside a vehicle. After forcing him out with tear gas, officers shot Robinson when he allegedly pulled a gun on officers. Robinson was also a former member of Representative Jasmine Crockett's security detail. |
| 2026-03-11 | Cleavon White (47) | Black | Rochester, Minnesota | Rochester Police responded to a report of a man in mental health crisis. Police determined the man posed a threat to both himself and others and attempted to place him on a 72-hour emergency hold. A struggle then ensued, during which, he reportedly grabbed an officer's gun before another officer fired his service weapon, killing him. The footage was released. |
| 2026-03-11 | Stephenson King (39) | Black | Boston, Massachusetts | Officers responded to a reported carjacking in the Roxbury neighborhood. Police said the suspect refused to follow commands and struck a police cruiser while attempting to drive away, leading an officer to shoot him. Officer Nicholas O'Malley was later arrested and charged with manslaughter, with prosecutors saying video of the shooting contradicted his claim that King was about to hit another officer. |
| 2026-03-10 | Jonathan L. Lupe (38) | Unknown | Shawano County, Wisconsin | Shawano County Sheriff's Office responded to a disturbance at a residence. Upon arrival, they found the subject locked himself in the bathroom and said he was armed. After less-lethal devices were deployed, the subject reportedly moved toward them with what they believed was a firearm before being shot. |
| 2026-03-10 | John Merop (23) | Unknown | Greene Township, Pike County, Pennsylvania | State Police responded to a home at the request of Pike County Mental Health and Mental Development officials. In the course of the encounter, troopers fatally shot the subject under unclear circumstances. District Attorney said the incident was captured on bodycams. |
| 2026-03-10 | Branden Scott Markham (36) | White | Draper, Utah | Riverton Police were surveilling a man as part of a narcotics investigation. They pulled the man over, during which they noticed that the passenger had a gun. Police said the passenger refused to give up the gun and got into an altercation with officers, leading to officers shooting him. |
| 2026-03-10 | unidentified male | Unknown | Farmington, New Mexico | Police responded to a domestic violence call and fatally shot a suspect. |
| 2026-03-10 | Jonathan Ingram (33) | Unknown | Baltimore, Maryland | After a burglary call, a suspect took a woman hostage and shot at police from a home window, hitting an officer in the leg. After a stand-off, during which the woman fled the home, a police sniper shot the suspect. |
| 2026-03-10 | William "Tyrone" Bell | Black | Bradenton, Florida | Bradenton Police shot and killed Bell during a raid. Police said Bell, who was partially paralyzed, was sitting in a room holding a gun. |
| 2026-03-09 | unidentified male (36) | Black | Houston, Texas | Law enforcement from Texas Attorney General's Office and the Harris County Pct. 7 Constable's Office were trying to serve a warrant on a suspect but ended up calling HPD SWAT team because the suspect barricaded himself inside. Despite negotiation efforts, the suspect emerged from the home armed with a rifle and pointed it at them. An exchanged of gunfire ensued which left the suspect dead. |
| 2026-03-09 | unidentified male | Unknown | Okeechobee, Florida | Okeechobee County deputies along with Crisis Negotiation Team were dispatched to de-escalate a situation involving an armed individual. The individual reportedly didn't comply and confronted them, leading deputies to shoot him. |
| 2026-03-09 | Derek Jordan (42) | Black | Chicago, Illinois | CPD officers in Humboldt Park spotted a white Mercedes related to a shooting in the morning. A vehicular pursuit ensued, during which, the suspect struck a pedestrian before crashing into a CTA bus. A fatal police shooting then unfolded when the officers tried to detain the suspect. |
| 2026-03-08 | Edilberto Espinoza-Sierra (21) | Hispanic | Wilmington, North Carolina | Officers heard gunfire at a parking deck and found a gunshot victim. Witnesses directed officers to two vehicles, and they detained several suspects at the first of them. Officers shot the driver of the second vehicle, Espinoza-Sierra, after he allegedly drove into a police car. |
| 2026-03-08 | Aaron Guevara (26) | Hispanic | Denton, Texas | Police were called to a pickleball court for reports of a man who appeared drunk. Officers found the man sitting on a fence, holding a metal rod. After the man allegedly leapt down from the fence and ran towards officers, one attempted to use a taser before another shot the man. |
| 2026-03-07 | Cynthia Anne Ivie Akers (53) | Unknown | West Rancho Dominguez, California | Police were called to a reported robbery at a 7-Eleven near the Harbor Gateway neighborhood of Los Angeles. Officers found the suspect behind the store counter and shot her after she allegedly pulled out a gun. The footage was released. |
| 2026-03-06 | Benjamin Yates Thorne (48) | Unknown | Chatsworth, Georgia | A Murray County Sheriff's Deputy responded to a home on a request of a property retrieval from another man who lived in the home. When that man and the deputy encountered Thorne, Thorne pointed a gun at them before the deputy shot him. Thorne then shot himself and was pronounced dead at the scene. |
| 2026-03-05 | Angela Marie Born (52) | White | Hurricane, West Virginia | During a vehicular pursuit of a fleeing suspect, Putnam County Sheriff's Office deployed spike strips on the suspect's vehicle, causing it to crash into another car, killing an uninvolved civilian driver. |
| 2026-03-05 | Deavon McGauley (39) | Black | Oakland Park, Florida | Broward Sheriff's deputies shot and killed a man who attacked them with a machete following reports of a suspicious person. |
| 2026-03-05 | Charles Butler (58) | Black | Buffalo, New York | Buffalo Police responded to a call for mental health service and shot the subject, who charged at them with two knives. An officer attempted to tase him but was unsuccessful. Police released the footage. |
| 2026-03-04 | Tha Wah (51) | Asian | Saint Paul, Minnesota | A sheriff's deputy responding to a pursuit crashed into Wah, an uninvolved motorist, killing him. |
| 2026-03-04 | Johnny Manion Friend (45) | Unknown | Golden Valley, Arizona | Officers arrived at the man's trailer and attempted to talk to him. He ignored commands and told deputies that he was armed. Deputies saw flames coming out of the trailer and the man opened fire at officers, before they returned, killing the man. |
| 2026-03-04 | Larunce Glee (25) | Unknown | Ashburn, Georgia | Police pulled over a car for having children standing inside while the car was moving. The driver fled, and officers detained him after a scuffle. Officers then got into a scuffle with Glee, the passenger, and shot him after he allegedly tried to remove a gun from his waistband. |
| 2026-03-04 | Mason W. Cure (33) | White | Semmes, Alabama | A crash involving a Semmes police officer left a driver dead and the officer severely injured. |
| 2026-03-03 | James Douglas McMillan (33) | White | Van Horn, Texas | A 33-year-old man from Greenfield, Wisconsin was killed by Border agents after fleeing a US Border Patrol checkpoint while attempting to cross through Sierra Blanca. A vehicle chase through Interstate 10 followed after a K9 was alerted to his car, crossing through Van Horn. The man fired his weapon out of his car window at law enforcement and civilian vehicles during the chase until a Texas DPS unit performed a maneuver to cause the driver to crash about 70 miles from where the chase began. He pointed his gun at officers while barricading, before officers fired back, killing him. |
| 2026-03-03 | Brandon Hall (45) | White | Soddy-Daisy, Tennessee | An officer shot and killed Hall outside of a Circle K following what police described as an "escalation". Few details were immediately released. |
| 2026-03-03 | Daniel Shacklett (35) | Unknown | Wilmington, Delaware | A long barricade standoff began when officers spoke to a man who made the initial report and learned that the man, who was an acquaintance, was inside the property with a handgun. After seven hours, the man was fatally shot by law enforcement after he fired at law enforcement from his house. |
| 2026-03-03 | unidentified male | Unknown | Cathedral City, California | A stabbing suspect was shot by police under unclear circumstances. |
| 2026-03-03 | Gustavo Guimaraes (34) | Unknown | Powder Springs, Georgia | Powder Springs Police responded to a shopping center regarding a man in mental health crisis. The man reportedly pulled a gun on them before being fatally shot. |
| 2026-03-03 | Abraham Gonzalo Lee (43) | Unknown | Pacific, Washington | A suspect shot an 18-year-old woman and a 14-year-old boy during a domestic violence dispute. Pacific officers responded to the scene. After attempts to de-escalate the situation failed, an officer shot the suspect to death. |
| 2026-03-03 | Josiah Gilliam (26) | Unknown | Nampa, Idaho | During a traffic stop, a felon drew a gun before Nampa officers opened fire, striking him in the hands. The passenger who reportedly provided the gun was shot and killed. |
| 2026-03-02 | Dyonte Lindsey (40) | Unknown | Albuquerque, New Mexico | APD Officers responded to a suspect running and entering traffic lanes on Interstate 40. Police later found Lindsey, who was armed with a knife. After their commands were ignored, officers tased him and took him into custody. Lindsey suffered a medical emergency and died two days later. The incident is investigated as in-custody death. |
| 2026-03-02 | Malcom Buchanan (32) | Black | Pasadena, California | Pasadena Police responded to a report about a gunman shooting someone in the shoulder at the Sierra Madre Villa Metro station. A second victim then approached officers and reported that the first victim had been shot while attempting to intervene in a sexual assault. When additional officers gained information and contacted the suspect, a gunfight ensued after a foot pursuit. The suspect was killed and the officer was injured. The footage was released. |
| 2026-03-01 | Sean Christopher Payne (32) | White | Williston, North Dakota | Williams County Police responded to a disturbance involving a firearm. Upon arrival, they encountered an armed man and fatally shot him. |
| 2026-03-01 | Alexander Lamorie (25) | White | Columbia, Maryland | Police were called to an apartment for a report of a man threatening to harm himself. Officers shot the man after he allegedly approached officers with a knife and refused commands to drop it. The footage was released by Howard County Police Department. |
| 2026-03-01 | Jared Llamado (32) | Hispanic | Annandale, Virginia | Following a road rage incident and crash on the Capital Beltway, Foreign Service Officer Llamado stabbed four women and his pet dog, killing a woman and the dog. A state trooper responded to the stabbing and fatally shot Llamado. |
| 2026-03-01 | Ndiaga Diagne (53) | Black | Austin, Texas | Diagne opened fire at a bar in Downtown Austin, killing three people and injuring fourteen others. Responding Austin police officers fatally shot him. The shooting is being investigated as an act of terrorism. The footage was released. |

== See also ==
- Death in custody § United States
- Henry A. Wallace Police Crime Public Database
- List of cases of police brutality
- List of countries with annual rates and counts for killings by law enforcement officers
- List of law enforcement officers killed in the line of duty in the United States
- List of law enforcement officers convicted for an on-duty killing in the United States
- List of shootings by US immigration agents
- List of police reforms related to the George Floyd protests
- List of unarmed African Americans killed by law enforcement officers in the United States
- Lists of killings by law enforcement officers
- Police brutality in the United States
- Police misconduct § United States
- Police riot § United States
- Police use of deadly force in the United States
