= Buckner Mountain (Missouri) =

Summit in the American state of Missouri

Coordinates: 37°33′37″N 90°20′20″W

Buckner Mountain is a summit in Madison County in the U.S. state of Missouri. The summit has an elevation of 935 feet (285 m).

Buckner Mountain has the name of Aylette Buckner, an early settler.
