= Oak Grove, Madison County, Missouri =

Unincorporated community in Missouri, U.S.

Coordinates: 37°34′22″N 90°23′41″W

Oak Grove is an unincorporated community in St. Francois Township in Madison County, Missouri, United States. It is located on Route 72, approximately six miles west of Fredericktown.

It received its name from its location in a grove of oak trees.
