= Catherine Place, Missouri =

Unincorporated community in Missouri, U.S.

Coordinates: 37°34′30″N 90°19′27″W

Catherine Place (more commonly called Catherine) is an unincorporated community in Madison County, in the U.S. state of Missouri.

The community derives its name from Catherine Cantwell, the wife of the proprietor of a nearby mine.
