= Combs Branch =

Stream in the American state of Missouri

Coordinates: 37°32′50″N 90°09′50″W

Combs Branch is a stream in Bollinger and Madison counties in the U.S. state of Missouri. It is a tributary of the Castor River

Combs Branch has the name of Silas Comb, a pioneer citizen.

== See also ==
- List of rivers of Missouri
