= Fredericktown station (Missouri Pacific Railroad) =

- Fredericktown Missouri Pacific Railroad Depot
- U.S. National Register of Historic Places
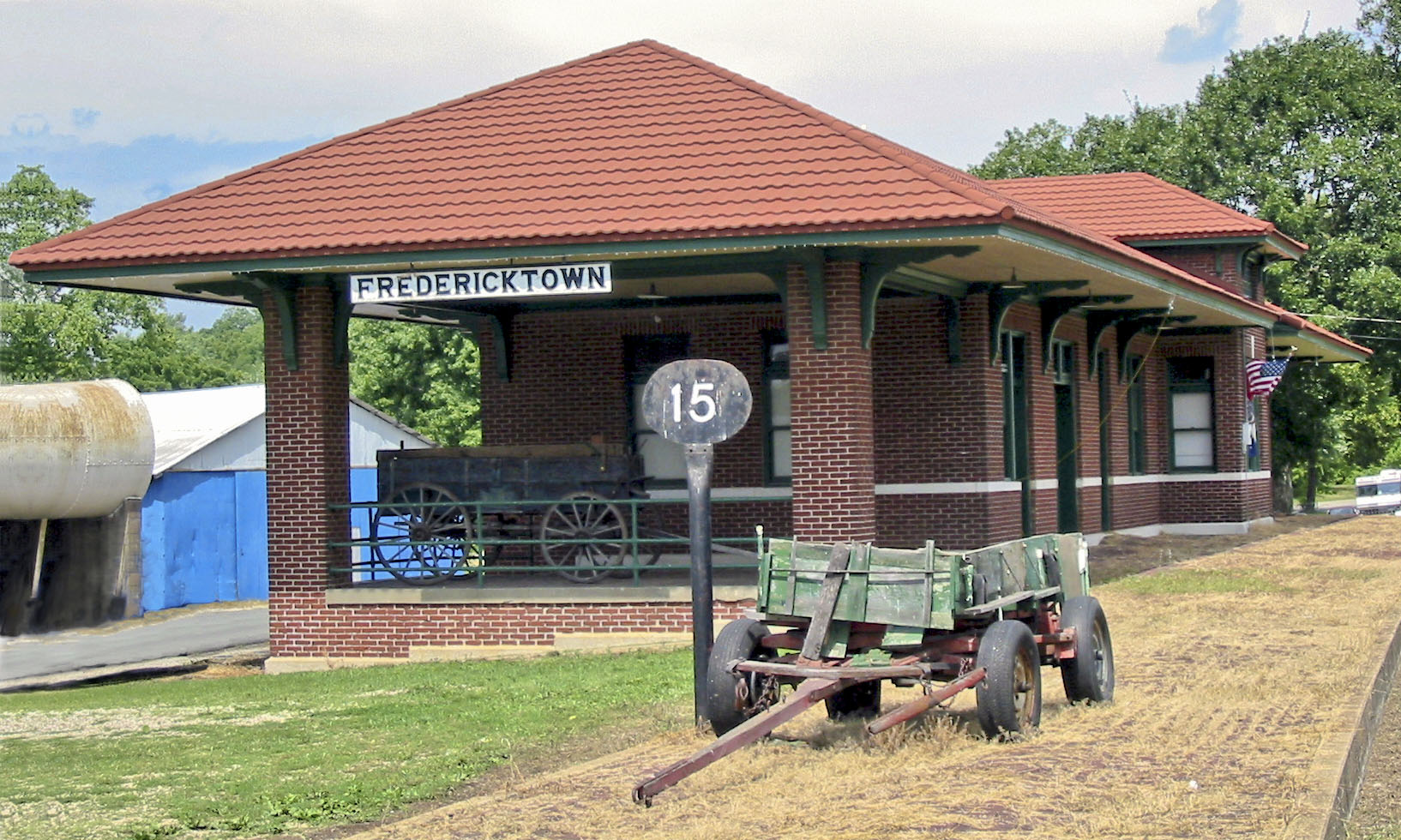
- Fredericktown Missouri Pacific Railroad Depot, August 2002

- Location within Missouri Location within the United States
- Location: 406 Villar St., Fredericktown, Missouri
- Coordinates: 37°33′52″N 90°17′30″W
- Area: less than one acre
- Built: 1917
- Built by: Gassmah, George H.
- Architectural style: railroad depot
- NRHP reference No.: 00000088
- Added to NRHP: February 10, 2000

Fredericktown Missouri Pacific Railroad Depot, also known as the Fredericktown Depot, is a historic train station located at Fredericktown, Madison County, Missouri. It was built in 1917 by the St. Louis, Iron Mountain and Southern Railway, later Missouri Pacific Railroad. It is a one-story rectangular brick building with a low-pitched red tile hipped roof with Prairie School and Bungalow / American Craftsman style influences. It measures 22 feet by 128 feet, and features widely overhanging eaves supported by large curvilinear brackets and a projecting dispatcher's bay. In 1917–1918, the new Fredericktown Missouri Pacific Depot took over passenger service, while freight continued to be handled by the original St. Louis, Iron Mountain and Southern Railroad Depot. Passenger service to Fredericktown was discontinued in 1972 and the building subsequently used for commercial enterprises.

It was added to the National Register of Historic Places in 2000.

Preceding station	Missouri Pacific Railroad	Following station
Mine La Motte toward Bismarck	Bismarck – Charleston	Cornwall toward Charleston
