= Tom Bayless =

American football player (born 1947)

No. 77
- Positions: Offensive lineman, defensive lineman

Personal information
- Born: December 17, 1947 (age 78); Knob Lick, Missouri, U.S.
- Listed height: 6 ft 3 in (1.91 m)
- Listed weight: 240 lb (109 kg)

Career information
- High school: East St. Louis (East St. Louis, Illinois)
- College: Purdue
- NFL draft: 1970: 15th round, 384th overall pick

Career history
- New York Jets (1970)

Career NFL statistics
- Games played: 2
- Stats at Pro Football Reference

Thomas McDowell Bayless (born December 17, 1947) is an American former professional football player who was an offensive and defensive lineman for one season with the New York Jets of the National Football League (NFL) in 1970. He played college football for the Purdue Boilermakers.

== Early life and education ==
Bayless was born on December 17, 1947, in the unincorporated community of Knob Lick, Missouri. He went to East St. Louis Senior High School in East St. Louis, Illinois and played fullback. He also set the state record for discus toss, however, his record was broken the next year by Ed Rogers. After high school he attended Purdue University and played one season for their football team, the Boilermakers. He had multiple different positions over his four years at Purdue but only played in one of them. His freshman year he was changed from fullback to linebacker due to being "not quick enough". He did not play in any games in his freshman year and did not in his sophomore year, either. He was switched from linebacker to center his second year and switched to tight end the next, but still didn't make any appearances. He was switched to interior offensive lineman in his senior year due to struggling with the ball at center. He was nicknamed "stone hands" by his teammates since he had trouble with handling. Later in his senior year he was switched for the fifth time to defensive lineman. He was able to work his way to a starting position and later became a top defensive lineman. Against Northwestern in October of '69, he graded out at 92, the highest of any Boilermaker lineman in the season.

== Professional career ==
Bayless was selected in 15th round (384th pick) of the 1970 NFL draft by the New York Jets. He had a very limited role with the Jets and only played in two games. He played in week 4 against Miami and week 5 against Baltimore. He was released at the conclusion of the season and did not play afterwards.
