= Lance, Missouri =

Unincorporated community in Missouri, U.S.

Coordinates: 37°35′09″N 90°27′11″W

Lance is an unincorporated community in Madison County, in the U.S. state of Missouri.

== History ==
A post office called Lance was established in 1894, and remained in operation until 1906. The community has the name of Daniel Jefferson Lance, an early settler.
