= Allbright, Missouri =

Unincorporated community in Missouri, U.S.

Coordinates: 37°19′44″N 90°13′36″W

Allbright is an unincorporated community in southeastern Madison County, in the U.S. state of Missouri.

Allbright is located on Gimlet Creek and the west side of the Castor River floodplain about one mile north of the Madison-Wayne county line.

== History ==
A post office called Allbright was established in 1905, and remained in operation until 1941. Frank Allbright, an early postmaster, gave the community his last name.
