= Captain Creek =

Stream in the American state of Missouri

Coordinates: 37°25′51″N 90°27′12″W

Captain Creek is a stream in Madison County in the U.S. state of Missouri. It is a tributary of the St. Francis River.

Captain Creek was named after Andrew "Captain" De Guire, a pioneer citizen.

== See also ==
- List of rivers of Missouri
