= Marquand, Missouri =

- City
- Cabin in Marquand

- Location in Madison County and the state of Missouri
- Coordinates: 37°25′43″N 90°10′01″W
- Country: United States
- State: Missouri
- County: Madison

Area
  - Total: 0.24 sq mi (0.62 km^{2})
  - Land: 0.24 sq mi (0.62 km^{2})
  - Water: 0.0039 sq mi (0.01 km^{2})
- Elevation: 564 ft (172 m)

Population (2020)
  - Total: 186
  - Density: 780.8/sq mi (301.45/km^{2})
- Time zone: UTC-6 (Central (CST))
  - Summer (DST): UTC-5 (CDT)
- ZIP code: 63655
- Area code: 573/235
- FIPS code: 29-46244
- GNIS feature ID: 2395016
- Website: www.marquandmo.org

Marquand is a small city in eastern Madison County, Missouri, United States. The population was 186 at the 2020 census. Marquand was officially recognized and incorporated as a town in 1906.

Post Office

== History ==
Marquand was platted in 1869, and named after Henry G. Marquand, a railroad official. A post office called Marquand has been in operation since 1870.

== Geography ==
Marquand is located adjacent to the Castor River on Missouri Route A. By road it is 14 miles (23 km) southeast of Fredericktown, the Madison county seat, and 17 miles (27 km) northwest of Marble Hill. Whitener Creek flows through the town from the northeast.

According to the U.S. Census Bureau, Marquand has a total area of 0.24 square miles (0.62 km^{2}), of which 0.002 square miles (1.3 acres), or 0.83%, are water.

== Demographics ==
Historical population
Census	Pop.	Note	%±
1910	339		—
1920	352		3.8%
1930	429		21.9%
1940	403		−6.1%
1950	369		−8.4%
1960	392		6.2%
1970	400		2.0%
1980	397		−0.7%
1990	278		−30.0%
2000	251		−9.7%
2010	203		−19.1%
2020	186		−8.4%
U.S. Decennial Census

=== 2010 census ===
As of the census of 2010, there were 203 people, 92 households, and 56 families living in the city. The population density was 845.8 inhabitants per square mile (326.6/km^{2}). There were 108 housing units at an average density of 450.0 per square mile (173.7/km^{2}). The racial makeup of the city was 100.00% White. Hispanic or Latino of any race were 0.49% of the population.

There were 92 households, of which 37.0% had children under the age of 18 living with them, 42.4% were married couples living together, 13.0% had a female householder with no husband present, 5.4% had a male householder with no wife present, and 39.1% were non-families. 34.8% of all households were made up of individuals, and 15.2% had someone living alone who was 65 years of age or older. The average household size was 2.21 and the average family size was 2.80.

The median age in the city was 40.5 years. 23.6% of residents were under the age of 18; 8.9% were between the ages of 18 and 24; 21.1% were from 25 to 44; 32.5% were from 45 to 64; and 13.8% were 65 years of age or older. The gender makeup of the city was 50.7% male and 49.3% female.

=== 2000 census ===
As of the census of 2000, there were 251 people, 95 households, and 66 families living in the city. The population density was 1,035.6 inhabitants per square mile (399.8/km^{2}). There were 124 housing units at an average density of 511.6 per square mile (197.5/km^{2}). The racial makeup of the city was 97.21% White, 0.40% Native American, 0.40% Asian, 0.40% from other races, and 1.59% from two or more races. Hispanic or Latino of any race were 1.20% of the population.

There were 95 households, out of which 35.8% had children under the age of 18 living with them, 46.3% were married couples living together, 15.8% had a female householder with no husband present, and 30.5% were non-families. 28.4% of all households were made up of individuals, and 15.8% had someone living alone who was 65 years of age or older. The average household size was 2.64 and the average family size was 3.21.

In the city the population was spread out, with 31.9% under the age of 18, 6.8% from 18 to 24, 28.7% from 25 to 44, 17.9% from 45 to 64, and 14.7% who were 65 years of age or older. The median age was 31 years. For every 100 females, there were 69.6 males. For every 100 females age 18 and over, there were 72.7 males.

The median income for a household in the city was $19,861, and the median income for a family was $25,000. Males had a median income of $30,341 versus $12,083 for females. The per capita income for the city was $8,533. About 25.0% of families and 32.5% of the population were below the poverty line, including 50.0% of those under the age of eighteen and 27.5% of those 65 or over.

== Education ==
The Marquand-Zion R-VI School District runs throughout most of eastern and southeastern Madison County and serves the educational needs of the town's residents and nearby. A small, rural school, the district consists of one elementary and one consolidated junior-senior high school. According to the Missouri Department of Elementary and Secondary Education, there was a total of 184 students and 35 certified staff members enrolled in the Marquand-Zion R-VI School District during the 2008–2009 school year. The school colors are purple and gold and its mascot is the tiger. Athletics offered in the school district include boys' basketball and baseball, girls' volleyball, and cheerleading.
