= Twelvemile Township, Madison County, Missouri =

Inactive township in the American state of Missouri

Coordinates: 37.3611°N 90.3858°W

Twelvemile Township is an inactive township in Madison County, in the U.S. state of Missouri.

Twelvemile Township takes its name from Twelvemile Creek.
