= Higdon, Missouri =

Unincorporated community in Missouri, U.S.

Coordinates: 37°35′34″N 90°10′04″W

Higdon is an unincorporated community in northeast Madison County, in the U.S. state of Missouri.

The community is located above the east bank of the Castor River, at its confluence with Dry Branch. Missouri Route NN passes the community. Fredericktown is approximately seven miles to the southwest.

== History ==
A post office called Higdon was established in 1895, and remained in operation until 1942. The community has the name of Captain William H. Higdon, a pioneer settler.
