= Junction City, Missouri =

- Village
- Location in Madison County and the state of Missouri
- Coordinates: 37°34′24″N 90°17′26″W
- Country: United States
- State: Missouri
- County: Madison

Area
  - Total: 0.36 sq mi (0.93 km^{2})
  - Land: 0.36 sq mi (0.93 km^{2})
  - Water: 0.0039 sq mi (0.01 km^{2})
- Elevation: 778 ft (237 m)

Population (2020)
  - Total: 283
  - Density: 790.1/sq mi (305.05/km^{2})
- Time zone: UTC-6 (Central (CST))
  - Summer (DST): UTC-5 (CDT)
- ZIP code: 63645 (Fredericktown)
- Area code: 573
- FIPS code: 29-37736
- GNIS feature ID: 2398317

Junction City is a village in Madison County, Missouri, United States. The population was 283 at the 2020 census, down from 327 in 2010.

== Geography ==
Junction City is in northeastern Madison County, bordered to the south by Fredericktown, the county seat. Missouri Route 72 passes through the village, leading west 2 miles (3 km) to U.S. Route 67 and east 40 miles (64 km) to Jackson. State Highway OO leads north from Junction City 18 miles (29 km) to Farmington.

According to the U.S. Census Bureau, Junction City has a total area of 0.36 square miles (0.93 km^{2}), of which 0.002 square miles (1.3 acres), or 0.56%, are water. The village is within the watershed of the Little St. Francis River.

== Demographics ==
Historical population
Census	Pop.	Note	%±
1960	260		—
1970	166		−36.2%
1980	238		43.4%
1990	326		37.0%
2000	319		−2.1%
2010	327		2.5%
2020	283		−13.5%
U.S. Decennial Census

=== 2010 census ===
As of the census of 2010, there were 327 people, 150 households, and 68 families living in the village. The population density was 908.3 inhabitants per square mile (350.7/km^{2}). There were 179 housing units at an average density of 497.2 per square mile (192.0/km^{2}). The racial makeup of the village was 96.94% White, 0.61% Black or African American, 0.31% Native Hawaiian or Pacific Islander, and 2.14% from two or more races. Hispanic or Latino of any race were 1.83% of the population.

There were 150 households, of which 28.0% had children under the age of 18 living with them, 23.3% were married couples living together, 18.7% had a female householder with no husband present, 3.3% had a male householder with no wife present, and 54.7% were non-families. 44.7% of all households were made up of individuals, and 33.3% had someone living alone who was 65 years of age or older. The average household size was 2.18 and the average family size was 3.18.

The median age in the village was 34.7 years. 25.4% of residents were under the age of 18; 13.1% were between the ages of 18 and 24; 21.4% were from 25 to 44; 15% were from 45 to 64; and 25.1% were 65 years of age or older. The gender makeup of the village was 49.2% male and 50.8% female.

=== 2000 census ===
As of the census of 2000, there were 319 people, 158 households, and 73 families living in the village. The population density was 894.9 inhabitants per square mile (345.5/km^{2}). There were 167 housing units at an average density of 468.5 per square mile (180.9/km^{2}). The racial makeup of the village was 98.43% White, and 1.57% from two or more races.

There were 158 households, out of which 23.4% had children under the age of 18 living with them, 32.3% were married couples living together, 11.4% had a female householder with no husband present, and 53.2% were non-families. 48.1% of all households were made up of individuals, and 27.2% had someone living alone who was 65 years of age or older. The average household size was 2.02 and the average family size was 2.92.

In the village, the population was spread out, with 23.5% under the age of 18, 8.8% from 18 to 24, 24.1% from 25 to 44, 22.3% from 45 to 64, and 21.3% who were 65 years of age or older. The median age was 38 years. For every 100 females, there were 82.3 males. For every 100 females age 18 and over, there were 78.1 males.

The median income for a household in the village was $15,833, and the median income for a family was $21,250. Males had a median income of $25,417 versus $8,500 for females. The per capita income for the village was $11,561. About 30.1% of families and 37.3% of the population were below the poverty line, including 59.7% of those under age 18 and 14.8% of those age 65 or over.
