= Henry S. Geyer =

American politician (1790–1859)

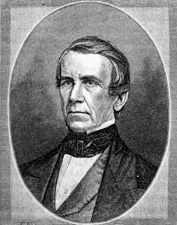

United States Senator from Missouri
- In office March 4, 1851 – March 3, 1857
- Preceded by: Thomas Hart Benton
- Succeeded by: Trusten Polk

Member of the Missouri House of Representatives
- In office 1820–1824; 1834–1835

Personal details
- Born: Henry Sheffie Geyer; December 9, 1790 Frederick, Maryland, U.S.
- Died: March 5, 1859 (aged 68) St. Louis, Missouri, U.S.
- Party: Whig, Opposition
- Profession: Politician, Lawyer

Military service
- Branch/service: United States Army
- Years of service: 1813-1815
- Rank: First Lieutenant
- Unit: 36th Regiment-Maryland Infantry
- Battles/wars: War of 1812

Henry Sheffie Geyer (December 9, 1790 – March 5, 1859) was a politician, lawyer, and soldier from Missouri. Born in Frederick, Maryland, he was the son of John Geyer, saddler of Frederick Town. Geyer was of German descent, his father having come from Prussia.

== Early life ==
Geyer was instructed privately, studied law, was admitted to the bar in 1811 and practiced law in Frederick. Most of Geyer's legal knowledge was gained by working in the office of his maternal uncle, Daniel Sheaffee, who was a prominent lawyer.

He also wrote for the Frederick Town papers and had knowledge of the printing business. Geyer moved from Maryland to Staunton, Augusta County, Virginia.

== Military career ==
During the War of 1812 he served as a first lieutenant in the Thirty-sixth Regiment, Maryland Infantry from 1813 to 1815. He reached the position of pay-master and spent some time stationed at Norfolk, Virginia. After the war ended, Geyer settled in St. Louis, Missouri, still holding the office of pay-master. He also began pursuing the study of law. After a year, Geyer resigned his pay-master position and began practicing law. Around the same time, he was appointed captain of the first military company west of the Mississippi River. Geyer was known as captain for the rest of his life.

Geyer became involved in a feud with Captain George Kennerby, the origin of which is unknown. Geyer was offended by Kennerby and challenged him to a duel. The two met at Bloody Island with pistols and exchanged shots. Kennerby was struck in the leg and was unable to stand. Both agreed to return to the fight at a later time, but before they could meet again, the argument was settled by the intervention of mutual friends and Geyer and Kennerby became friends for life.

== Political career ==
In addition to his political career, in St. Louis, Geyer wrote for the Missouri Republican and was an editor of the St. Louis Times in 1833.

Geyer was a member of the convention of Missouri and helped to write the first Missouri constitution. He was a member of the Territorial assembly in 1818 and a delegate to the constitutional convention in 1820. In 1818, Geyer published a compilation of Missouri's territorial laws, known as "Geyer's Digest." From 1820 to 1824 he was a member of the Missouri House of Representatives and again in 1834–1835, serving as speaker on two occasions. In the 1830s, Geyer helped form and lead Missouri's Whig Party. He authored the Geyer Act of 1839 establishing public education in Missouri as well as the University of Missouri.

In 1850, Geyer was offered the position of secretary of war by President Millard Fillmore, but Geyer declined. He was elected senator after gaining support from both Whigs and Democrats over his ambiguous stance on slavery. Geyer succeeded Thomas Hart Benton, who ended his senatorial career by insisting that Congress had the power to restrict slavery in the federal territories. Benton was a senator for thirty years, and it was the first time he had been defeated in Missouri for the senatorship.

Geyer was elected as a Whig to the U.S. Senate and served from March 4, 1851, to March 3, 1857. Geyer was elected to the Senate just as his own Whig party was dissolving and prominent leaders took other positions. The last Whig convention was in Baltimore on June 16, 1852. For two years, Geyer was the only senator from Missouri. Missouri became the first state to be represented by only one senator for a considerable period of time. The views of Bentonites and anti-Bentonites were so contentious, that the legislature did not elect another senator and the governor did not appoint anyone, believing it was not within the governor's ability to do so.

During his time in the Senate, Geyer voted for the Kansas-Nebraska bill, which demonstrated his proslavery views.

== Legal career ==
In the late 1830s or early 1840s, Henry Geyer had a law partnership with Benjamin B. Dayton, which was in business until Geyer was elected to the Senate. The firm of Geyer & Dayton had a large business and tried many important land suits.

Geyer did not seek reelection to the Senate after 1857 and resumed the practice of law. He was recruited to assist Reverdy Johnson in defending John F.A. Sanford, the slave-owner in the Dred Scott case. Geyer was asked to join Johnson because of his knowledge of Missouri law, his experience arguing in front of the Supreme Court, and his strong southern views. During the trial, Geyer argued for limited federal oversight of state supreme court decisions, against Dred Scott's right to bring suit in federal court, and stated that the Missouri Compromise was unconstitutional.

Geyer gained national recognition as a lawyer when he argued the case of The State vs. Darnes in 1840. Darnes was indicted for manslaughter for killing Mr. Davis, the publisher of the St. Louis Democratic newspaper, The Argus. An article in the paper denounced certain politicians, which offended Darnes. Darnes confronted Davis and struck him with an iron cane several times. Davis was taken to the hospital, but died after eight days. On the eighth day, Dr. Beaumont, a skilled surgeon, performed a trephining procedure on Davis to relieve pressure on the skull. In his argument, Geyer maintained that Davis' death was caused by the surgery and not the injuries he sustained from Darnes. Davis was convicted of manslaughter in the third or fourth degree, essentially amounting to an acquittal. Geyer's two day argument was published in pamphlet form, republished in Boston, and used by the New England bar in similar cases.

== Personal life ==
Henry Geyer married one of seven daughters of Rufus Easton, the first postmaster of St. Louis. This was one of three wives that Geyer married. At his death, he left a widow, one son, and two daughters.

== Death and legacy ==
Geyer died in St. Louis on March 5, 1859, and was interred at Bellefontaine Cemetery. He was sixty-eight years old. Geyer Road in St. Louis is named in his honor.

U.S. Senate
Preceded by Thomas Hart Benton	U.S. senator (Class 1) from Missouri; March 4, 1851 – March 3, 1857; Served alongside: David R. Atchison and James S. Green	Succeeded by Trusten Polk
Preceded by James Caldwell	Speaker of the Missouri House of Representatives; 1821–1825	Succeeded by Alex Stuart
