= Tin Mine Mountain =

Mountain in the U.S. state of Missouri

Coordinates: 37°31′00″N 90°25′04″W

Tin Mine Mountain (also called Tin Mountain) is a summit in Madison County in the U.S. state of Missouri. It has an elevation of 1,115 feet (340 m).

Tin Mine Mountain rises about 500 feet above the St. Francis River which flows past the west end of the mountain. The USGS quadrangle map shows the mountain as having two peaks (a western peak at 1121 ft. and an eastern peak at 1141 ft.). Missouri Route E passes by the south side of the mountain. Fredericktown is about seven miles to the east-northeast.

Tin Mine Mountain was named for a short-lived but expensive attempt at tin mining, which ended when no tin was discovered.
