= Little St. Francis River =

Location
- Country: United States
- State: Missouri
- Region: Madison County and St. Francois County

Physical characteristics
- Source
  - location: St. Francois County
  - coordinates: 37°41′31″N 90°15′29″W
- Mouth
  - location: Madison County
  - coordinates: 37°32′16″N 90°26′27″W
  - elevation: 577 ft (176 m)
- Discharge
  - location: Fredericktown, MO
  - average: 128 cu/ft. per sec.

Basin features
- Tributaries
  - left: Rock Creek, Village Creek, Slater Branch
  - right: Musco Creek

The Little St. Francis River is a stream in eastern St. Francois and northeastern Madison counties of southeastern Missouri. It is a tributary of the St. Francis River.

The stream headwaters arise in eastern St. Francois County on the north flank of Lewis Hill about one mile southwest of the St. Francois-Ste. Genevieve county line. The stream flows west past the community of Libertyville passing under Missouri Route OO and turns to the south about three miles east of Knob Lick. The stream meanders to the south into Madison County passing west of Mine La Motte. The stream is impounded as City Lake on the northeast side of Fredericktown and passes just west of Fredericktown before turning west and passing under U.S. Route 67. The stream meanders to the west past Tin Mine Mountain to its confluence with the St. Francis within the Mark Twain National Forest.

== Tributaries ==
- Wills Branch
