= United States Post Office (Fredericktown, Missouri) =

- Fredericktown United States Post Office
- U.S. National Register of Historic Places
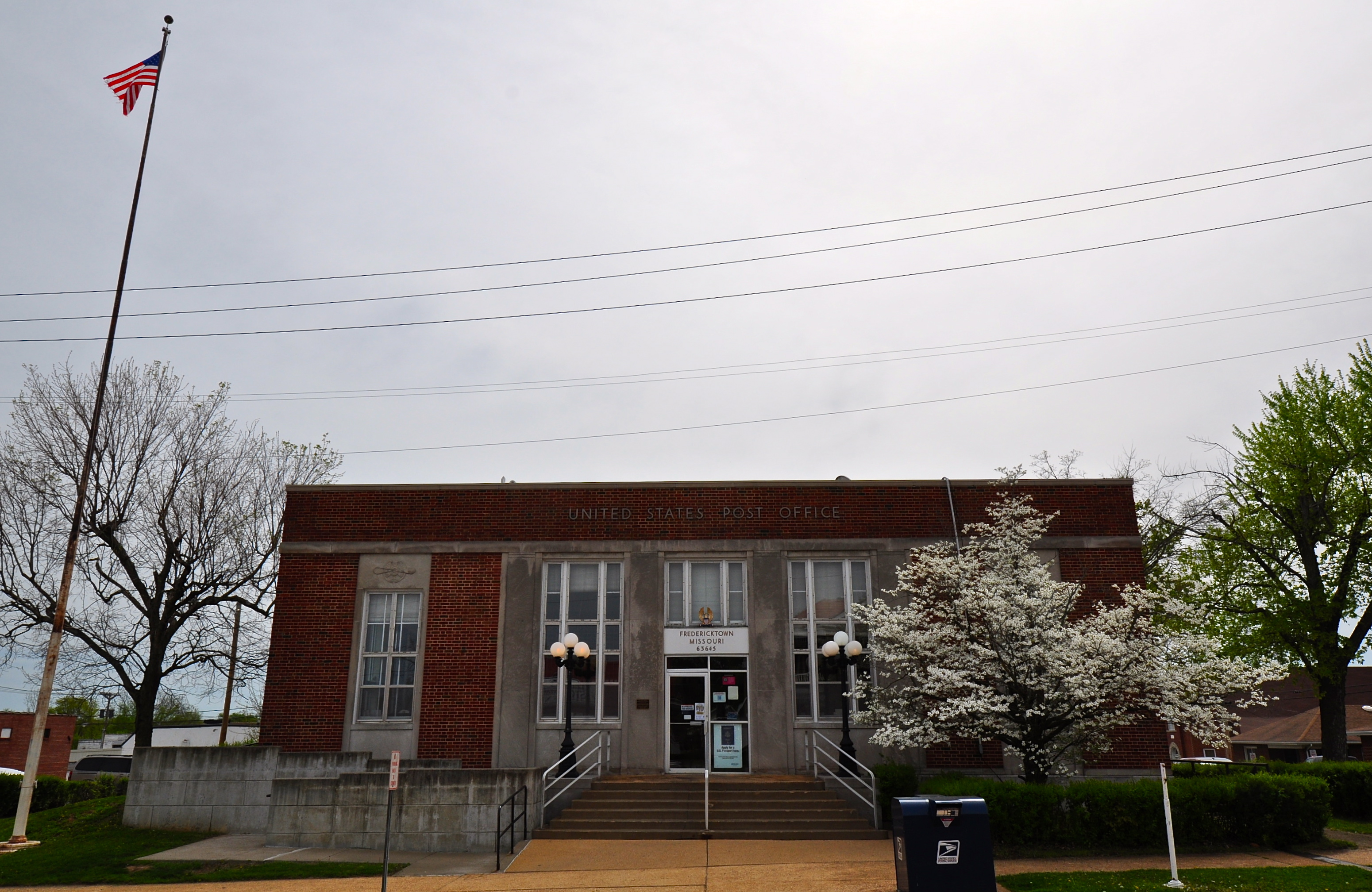
- Fredericktown United States Post Office, April 2014

- Location within Missouri Location within the United States
- Location: 155 S. Main St., Fredericktown, Missouri
- Coordinates: 37°33′29″N 90°17′39″W
- Area: less than one acre
- Built: 1936-1937
- Built by: Hiram Lloyd Building & Const.
- Architect: Simon, Louis A.
- Architectural style: Moderne
- NRHP reference No.: 09000814
- Added to NRHP: October 8, 2009

Fredericktown United States Post Office is a historic post office building located at Fredericktown, Madison County, Missouri. It was designed by the Office of the Supervising Architect under Louis A. Simon and built in 1936–1937. It is a one-story, rectangular, WPA-Moderne style red brick and limestone building. It measures approximately 64 feet by 68 feet and features an elaborated raised entrance within an ashlar enframement of pilasters and tall, complex windows. The lobby has a Treasury Section of Fine Arts mural by Missourian James Baare Turnbull titled, "The Lead Belt," installed in 1939.

It was added to the National Register of Historic Places in 2009.
