= Fredericktown station (St. Louis, Iron Mountain and Southern Railroad) =

- St. Louis, Iron Mountain and Southern Railroad Depot
- U.S. National Register of Historic Places
- Location within Missouri Location within the United States
- Location: Allen St., 150 ft. No of Jct. of Allen and Kelly Sts., Fredericktown, Missouri
- Coordinates: 37°34′3″N 90°17′35″W
- Area: 1.1 acres (0.45 ha)
- Built: 1869, c. 1908
- Architectural style: Frame Depot
- NRHP reference No.: 05001178
- Added to NRHP: October 19, 2005

St. Louis, Iron Mountain and Southern Railroad Depot is a historic train station located at Fredericktown, Madison County, Missouri. It was built in 1869 and expanded about 1908 by the St. Louis, Iron Mountain and Southern Railway. It is a one-story, rectangular wood-frame building with a gable roof on short wood piers. The original rectangular section was approximately 25 feet by 65 feet and the addition extended the building approximately 30 feet. In 1917–1918, the new Fredericktown Missouri Pacific Railroad Depot took over passenger service, while freight continued to be handled by the original depot.

It was added to the National Register of Historic Places in 2005.
