= Hahns Mill, Missouri =

Unincorporated community in Missouri, U.S.

Coordinates: 37°33′31″N 90°09′18″W

Hahns Mill is an unincorporated community in Madison County, in the U.S. state of Missouri.

The community was named after John Hahn, the proprietor of a local gristmill.
