= Saint Francois Township, Madison County, Missouri =

Inactive township in the US state of Missouri

Coordinates: 37.5081°N 90.4078°W

Saint Francois Township is an inactive township in Madison County, in the U.S. state of Missouri.

Saint Francois Township was established in 1845, taking its name from a variant name of the St. Francis River.
