= Saint Michel, Missouri =

Abandoned village in Missouri, United States

Coordinates: 37.564°N 90.294°W

St. Michel is an abandoned village located in Madison County, Missouri, United States. St. Michel is now incorporated into Fredericktown.

== Etymology ==
The origin of the name is uncertain. One of the original founders, Nicholas Caillot, had been a knight of the Order of Saint Michael in France, which most likely accounts for the settlement's name. Michael Caillot was also among the founders, and Nicholas had a son named Michael; Saint Michael was the patron saint of both.

== History ==
Founded in the years between 1790−1800, St. Michel was established as a lead-mining village. The founders of St. Michel were a cohesive group of thirteen families, French Creoles of the Illinois Country with roots in Canada and a few native French who had lived for some time in the valley. Eight of these families were from New Bourbon. Among these first settlers were Antoine, Gabriel, Nicholas, Joseph, Francois, and Michel Caillot det La Chance; Peter Chevalier, Gabriel Nicollet, Pierre Variat; Paul, Andrew, and Baptiste De Guire, and Jerome Matis, who were French-Canadians from Ste. Genevieve and New Bourbon. These men were given concessions of land by the Spanish authorities of Upper Louisiana with each family receiving 400 arpents of land extending from the Little St. Francis River to Saline Creek. The village of St. Michel was forced to move to higher ground by the floods of 1814 when the Saline and Castor Creeks overflowed their banks, and drove the inhabitants out. Some of the families refused to return, and established what was known as the new village, one and one-half miles north of St. Michel. The old site was referred to as "The Village" although there is nothing there to indicate the spot except Calvary Cemetery. The new village numbered about 50 people in 1823. Soon after, on the Saline opposite the village, Germans had settled, as well as other groups from North and South Carolina, Tennessee, Kentucky, and Virginia, and these settlers evidently outnumbered their French neighbors. In 1819 when a county seat was to be laid out, the commissioners bought land from one of the settlers from North Carolina and laid out a town, which they called Fredericktown. This new town gradually absorbed St. Michel so that today the name is preserved only in the Catholic Church and in the name of the township.

== Village ==
The French Creoles of St. Michel built their homes in the American log cabin style, which the French referred to as pièces sur pièces (horizontal logs) rather than in the French vertical log Poteaux en terre (posts-in-the-ground) or Poteaux-sur-sol (post-on-a-sill) style, with perpendicular log posts set closely together in the ground or on a sill, and with clay chinked in-between filling the interstices. This suggests either that St. Michel housed a lower economic class or that Americans nearby aided the Creoles in house raising and the Creoles accepted the American style of log house construction.

The Catholic church of St. Michel was established in 1802 and named after the Archangel Michel, to whom early Christians gave the care of their sick. Whether the church was blessed on St. Michael's day or was dedicated to the patron saint of one of the members, is not known. The original church was a log church.

== Population ==
St. Michel had a population of 65 in the year 1804, and was estimated to have had approximately 100 inhabitants in the years 1815−1816, with 300 inhabitants in the years 1818−1820. Some 250 persons were counted in 1830.

== Mining ==
The purpose of the settlement was to extract lead for the Upper Louisiana colony. The French smelted lead ore in the simplest way by piling it on top of logs in pits that were then set alight, leaving the smelted lead to gather at the bottom of the pit, and these log smelters or furnaces numbered around twenty. Eventually, an American miner, Moses Austin, arrived in 1797 and built a Scotch hearth, or reverberatory furnace, to replace the grossly inefficient log-pit furnaces, and the miners brought their lead to it to be smelted. The construction of the Scotch hearth furnace led to the complete abandonment of log smelting. The cutting of lumber to feed the furnaces also led to a quick depletion of trees in the area. The bonanza community and the wealth generated by mining attracted gamblers and adventurers to St. Michel.
