= French Mills, Missouri =

Unincorporated community in Missouri, U.S.

Coordinates: 37°27′21″N 90°29′21″W

French Mills is an unincorporated community in western Madison County, in the U.S. state of Missouri. The community is on [Little Rock Creek (St. Francis River)], just north of that stream's confluence with the St. Francis River.

== History ==
A post office called French Mills was established in 1879, and remained in operation until 1886. The community was named for the French proprietor of a local watermill.
