= KFDS-FM =

- Marquand, Missouri; United States
- Broadcast area: Poplar Bluff, Missouri; Ozark National Scenic Riverways
- Frequency: 101.9 MHz
- Branding: Kickin' Country 101.9

Programming
- Format: Country

Ownership
- Owner: Dockins Broadcast Group, LLC
- Sister stations: KPWB; KYLS-FM; KLMZ

History
- First air date: September 5, 1985
- Former call signs: KPWB-FM (1985–2026)
- Former frequencies: 104.9 MHz (1985–2024)

Technical information
- Licensing authority: FCC
- Facility ID: 28121
- Class: C2
- ERP: 50 kW
- HAAT: 261 meters (856 ft)
- Transmitter coordinates: 37°11′35.1″N 90°39′49.4″W

Links
- Public license information: Public file; LMS

KFDS-FM (101.9 FM) is a radio station licensed to the city of Marquand, Missouri. KFDS-FM broadcasts a country music format known as "Kickin' Country 101.9".

This station began broadcasting as KPWB-FM 104.9, licensed to Piedmont, Missouri, on September 5, 1985. The permit had been included in the sale of KPWB (1140 AM) to Sam English earlier that year. As KPWB was a daytime-only station on AM, adding the FM outlet allowed it to begin nighttime broadcasting or even split programming. When KPWB-FM began broadcasting, it was a simulcast of KPWB AM, continuing its format in the evening. In 1991, the KPWB stations were sold to Hunt Broadcasting Group, at which time KPWB AM aired an adult contemporary format.

Dockins Broadcast Group owned KPWB-AM-FM from 2003 to 2008, when the stations were sold to Southern Star Communications of Tennessee. By March 2008, KPWB AM was off the air due to flood damage. A year later, KPWB-FM also went off the air with no notice to advertisers or religious ministries. Dockins, which held a security interest in the KPWB stations after selling to Southern Star, successfully filed seeking back rent and possession of the property and moved to reopen KPWB AM and FM.

In 2024, Dockins Broadcast Group requested to move KPWB-FM to the northeast and change its frequency to 101.9 MHz and city of license to Marquand. Its call sign was changed to KFDS-FM on May 7, 2026.
