= Cobalt, Missouri =

- Village
- Cobalt Village
- Location in Madison County and the state of Missouri
- Coordinates: 37°32′44″N 90°17′15″W
- Country: United States
- State: Missouri
- County: Madison

Area
  - Total: 0.15 sq mi (0.39 km^{2})
  - Land: 0.15 sq mi (0.39 km^{2})
  - Water: 0 sq mi (0.00 km^{2})
- Elevation: 774 ft (236 m)

Population (2020)
  - Total: 264
  - Density: 1,774.8/sq mi (685.25/km^{2})
- Time zone: UTC-6 (Central (CST))
  - Summer (DST): UTC-5 (CDT)
- ZIP code: 63645 (Fredericktown)
- Area code: 573
- FIPS code: 29-15220
- GNIS feature ID: 753200
- Website: www.cobaltvillage.org

Cobalt is a village in Madison County, Missouri, United States. As of the 2020 census, the population was 264, up from 226 in 2010.

== Geography ==
The village is in northeastern Madison County, bordered to the north by the city of Fredericktown, the county seat. According to the U.S. Census Bureau, the village has a total area of 0.15 square miles (0.39 km^{2}), all land.

== Demographics ==
Historical population
Census	Pop.	Note	%±
1960	434		—
1970	238		−45.2%
1980	272		14.3%
1990	254		−6.6%
2000	189		−25.6%
2010	226		19.6%
2020	264		16.8%
U.S. Decennial Census

=== 2010 census ===
As of the census of 2010, there were 226 people, 94 households, and 56 families living in the village. The population density was 1,506.7 inhabitants per square mile (581.7/km^{2}). There were 104 housing units at an average density of 693.3 per square mile (267.7/km^{2}). The racial makeup of the village was 99.56% White and 0.44% from two or more races. Hispanic or Latino of any race were 1.77% of the population.

There were 94 households, of which 27.7% had children under the age of 18 living with them, 44.7% were married couples living together, 9.6% had a female householder with no husband present, 5.3% had a male householder with no wife present, and 40.4% were non-families. 31.9% of all households were made up of individuals, and 8.5% had someone living alone who was 65 years of age or older. The average household size was 2.40 and the average family size was 3.09.

The median age in the village was 39.8 years. 23% of residents were under the age of 18; 8.9% were between the ages of 18 and 24; 26.1% were from 25 to 44; 31% were from 45 to 64; and 11.1% were 65 years of age or older. The gender makeup of the village was 48.7% male and 51.3% female.

=== 2000 census ===
As of the 2000 United States census, there were 189 people, 79 households, and 54 families living in the village. The population density was 1,300.8 inhabitants per square mile (502.2/km^{2}). There were 89 housing units at an average density of 612.5 per square mile (236.5/km^{2}). The racial makeup of the village was 100.00% White.

There were 79 households, out of which 27.8% had children under the age of 18 living with them, 53.2% were married couples living together, 13.9% had a female householder with no husband present, and 31.6% were non-families. 24.1% of all households were made up of individuals, and 10.1% had someone living alone who was 65 years of age or older. The average household size was 2.39 and the average family size was 2.91.

In the village, the population was spread out, with 23.3% under the age of 18, 10.6% from 18 to 24, 28.6% from 25 to 44, 26.5% from 45 to 64, and 11.1% who were 65 years of age or older. The median age was 37 years. For every 100 females, there were 103.2 males. For every 100 females age 18 and over, there were 93.3 males.

The median income for a household in the village was $20,962, and the median income for a family was $21,923. Males had a median income of $19,792 versus $12,500 for females. The per capita income for the village was $9,361. About 1.8% of families and 8.4% of the population were below the poverty line, including none of those under the age of eighteen and 7.1% of those 65 or over.
