= KYLS-FM =

- Ironton, Missouri; United States
- Broadcast area: Farmington, Missouri
- Frequency: 95.9 MHz
- Branding: Froggy 96

Programming
- Format: New country
- Affiliations: Fox News Radio

Ownership
- Owner: Dockins Broadcast Group, LLC
- Sister stations: KPWB; KPWB-FM

History
- First air date: 1984
- Former call signs: KYLS (1983–1997)

Technical information
- Licensing authority: FCC
- Facility ID: 15655
- Class: C3
- ERP: 3,100 watts
- HAAT: 198.1 meters (650 ft)
- Transmitter coordinates: 37°39′59.6″N 90°34′39.3″W

Links
- Public license information: Public file; LMS
- Website: Official website

KYLS-FM (95.9 FM, "Froggy 96") is a radio station broadcasting a new country music format. Licensed to Ironton, Missouri, United States, the station is owned by Dockins Broadcast Group, LLC, and features programming from Fox News Radio.

== History ==
The Federal Communications Commission issued a construction permit for the station to Dockins Communications, Inc. on October 19, 1983. The station was assigned the call letters KYLS on December 5, 1983, and received its license to cover on September 24, 1984. On August 11, 1997, the station changed its call sign to the current KYLS-FM. The station's license is assigned to Dockins.
