= Madison County Courthouse (Missouri) =

- U.S. National Register of Historic Places
- Madison County Courthouse, November 2026

- Location within Missouri Location within the United States
- Location: 1 Courthouse Sq., Fredericktown, Missouri
- Coordinates: 37°33′34″N 90°17′40″W
- Area: less than one acre
- Built: 1900
- Built by: Miller, Louis
- Architects: Link, Theodore Carl
- Architectural style: Late Victorian
- NRHP reference No.: 00001548
- Added to NRHP: December 28, 2000

Madison County Courthouse is a historic courthouse located in Fredericktown, Madison County, Missouri. It was designed by architect Theodore Link and built in 1900. It is a two-story, rectangular, eclectic Late Victorian style brick and granite building with an attic and full basement. It measures approximately 66 feet by 76 feet and has a hipped roof. It features a square, five-story tower with a steep pyramidal roof and finial.

It was added to the National Register of Historic Places in 2000.
