= KPWB (AM) =

- Piedmont, Missouri; United States
- Frequency: 1140 kHz

Ownership
- Owner: Dockins Broadcast Group

History
- First air date: May 16, 1966
- Call sign meaning: Piedmont/Watson and Bumpus, original owners

Technical information
- Licensing authority: FCC
- Facility ID: 28120
- Class: D
- Power: 1,000 watts (daytime only)
- Transmitter coordinates: 37°8′29.2″N 90°42′11.4″W
- Translator: K221GO (92.1 MHz)

Links
- Public license information: Public file; LMS

KPWB (1140 AM) is a radio station in Piedmont, Missouri, United States. It is owned by Dockins Broadcast Group. The station has been on the air in Piedmont since 1966.

== History ==
On January 25, 1965, Gaylon Watson and Joseph M. Bumpus, trading as the Wayne County Broadcasting Company, applied for a new, 250-watt daytime-only radio station on 1140 kHz in Piedmont. The commission granted the application on November 4, 1965, and KPWB began broadcasting on May 16, 1966, with a country music format as well as local news and religious programming. A popular early feature on the station was radio bingo until the Missouri Attorney General ruled that such games constituted illegal lotteries. Power was increased to 1,000 watts in 1967. In 1982, the station was the last communication link with the outside world when Piedmont was surrounded by floodwaters.

In 1985, KPWB was sold to Sam English of Poplar Bluff and his Clearwater Broadcasting. The sale included an FM construction permit held by the station, allowing it to begin nighttime broadcasting or even split programming. In late 1985, KPWB-FM 104.9 began broadcasting as a simulcast of KPWB AM, continuing its format in the evening. In 1991, the KPWB stations were sold to Hunt Broadcasting Group, at which time KPWB AM aired an adult contemporary format.

Dockins Broadcast Group owned KPWB-AM-FM from 2003 to 2008, when the stations were sold to Southern Star Communications of Tennessee. By March 2008, KPWB AM was off the air due to flood damage. A year later, KPWB-FM also went off the air with no notice to advertisers or religious ministries. Dockins, which held a security interest in the KPWB stations after selling to Southern Star, successfully filed seeking back rent and possession of the property and moved to reopen KPWB AM and FM.
