= Mine La Motte, Missouri =

Unincorporated community in Missouri

- Census-designated place
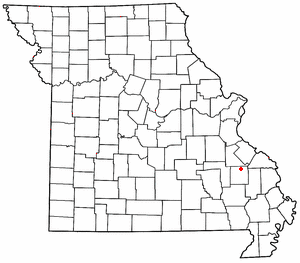
- Location in Missouri
- Coordinates: 37°36′52″N 90°17′40″W
- Country: United States
- State: Missouri
- County: Madison

Area
  - Total: 3.37 sq mi (8.73 km^{2})
  - Land: 3.27 sq mi (8.47 km^{2})
  - Water: 0.097 sq mi (0.25 km^{2})
- Elevation: 774 ft (236 m)

Population (2020)
  - Total: 364
  - Density: 111.3/sq mi (42.97/km^{2})
- ZIP code: 63645
- Area code: 573
- FIPS code: 29-48602
- GNIS feature ID: 2587090

Mine La Motte (/ˌmaɪn lə ˈmɒt/ MYNE lə MOT) is an unincorporated community and census-designated place (CDP) in Madison County, Missouri, United States. As of the 2020 census, the population was 364.

== History ==
Europeans discovered lead here and had also hoped to find silver. The French governor of Louisiana, Antoine de la Mothe Cadillac, failed to find silver, but succeeded in recruiting investors in the Company of the West, which was organized in 1717. Mine La Motte was eventually settled by about 200 French settlers along with their slaves from Santo Domingo, under the leadership of Philip François Renault, to develop mines in 1717, making it one of the oldest settlements west of the Mississippi River. The presence of lead, a critical ingredient for ammunition, attracted unusually early mining by French colonists in this otherwise remote interior region of the North American continent. That same lead, still used for ammunition nearly 150 years later at the time of the American Civil War, was also a factor in the Battle of Fredericktown, in which forces aligned with the Confederate States of America fought for control of the lead smelters in nearby Fredericktown with the Union forces, aligned with the United States of America.

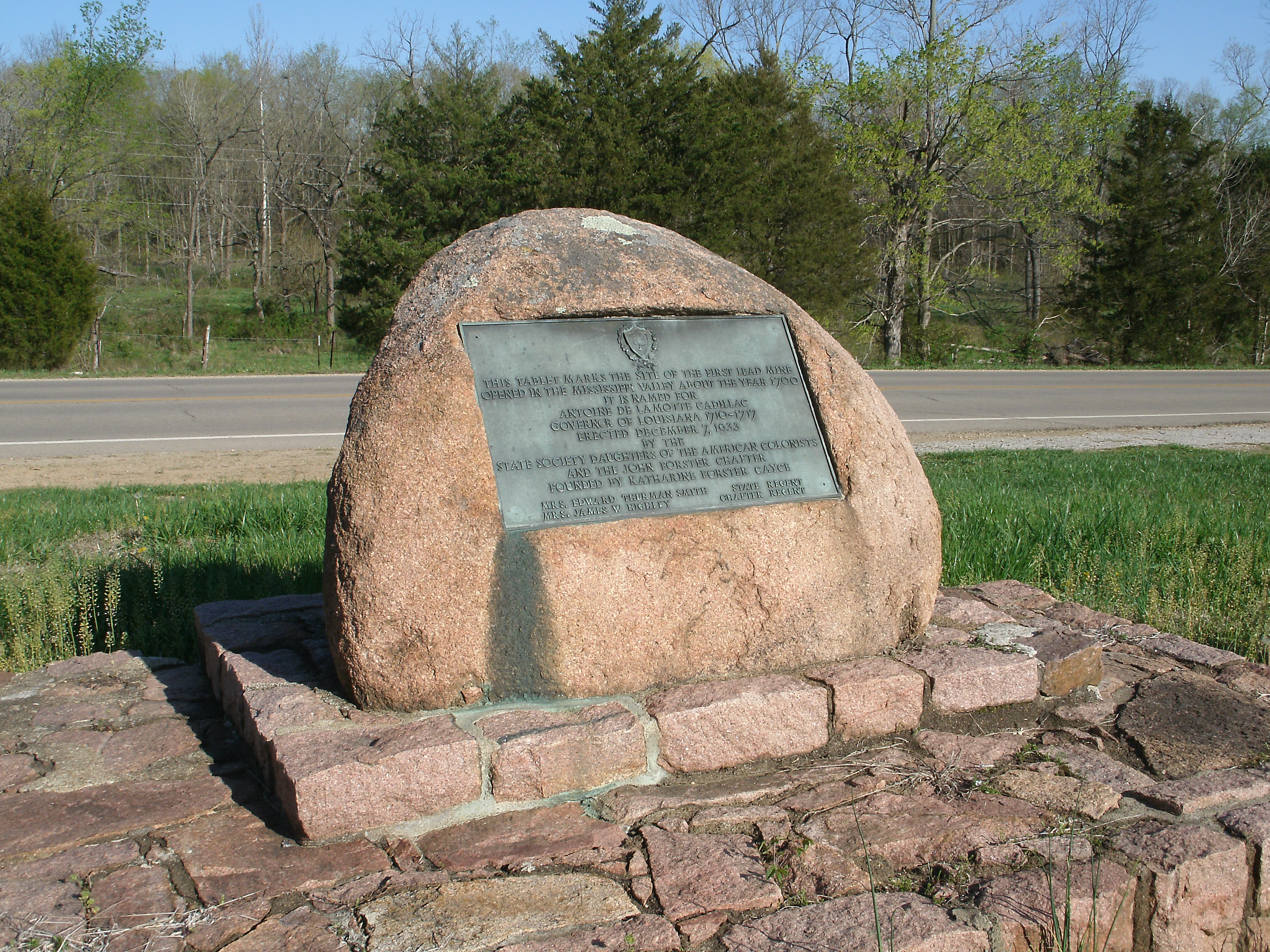
Historical marker at the site of the first lead mine in Missouri

La Mothe named the mine after himself, and the town that grew up nearby was named after the mine. While dispatching workers and supervisors to the mines, La Mothe settled for a time in the Illinois Country east of the mid-Mississippi River, where the first French colonial villages were founded. In 1804 the village had a population of 150. These settlers were mostly French Canadians who developed agriculture. Due to the rich soils, they were quickly able to produce grain surpluses that were critical to the survival of the lower Louisiana colony. The habitants shipped tons of grain to New Orleans and other points south on the Mississippi River. La Mothe later served as Governor-General of Louisiana.

== Geography ==
Mine La Motte is in northern Madison County, 4 miles (6 km) north of Fredericktown, the county seat. According to the U.S. Census Bureau, the CDP has a total area of 3.37 square miles (8.73 km^{2}), of which 0.10 square miles (0.26 km^{2}), or 2.91%, are water. Sweetwater Branch flows westward through the center of the community to the Little St. Francis River, which bends through the west side of the community on its way to join the St. Francis River.

== Demographics ==
Historical population
Census	Pop.	Note	%±
2010	348		—
2020	364		4.6%
U.S. Decennial Census

== See also ==
- Southeast Missouri Lead District
