= Knob Lick, Missouri =

- Census-Designated Place
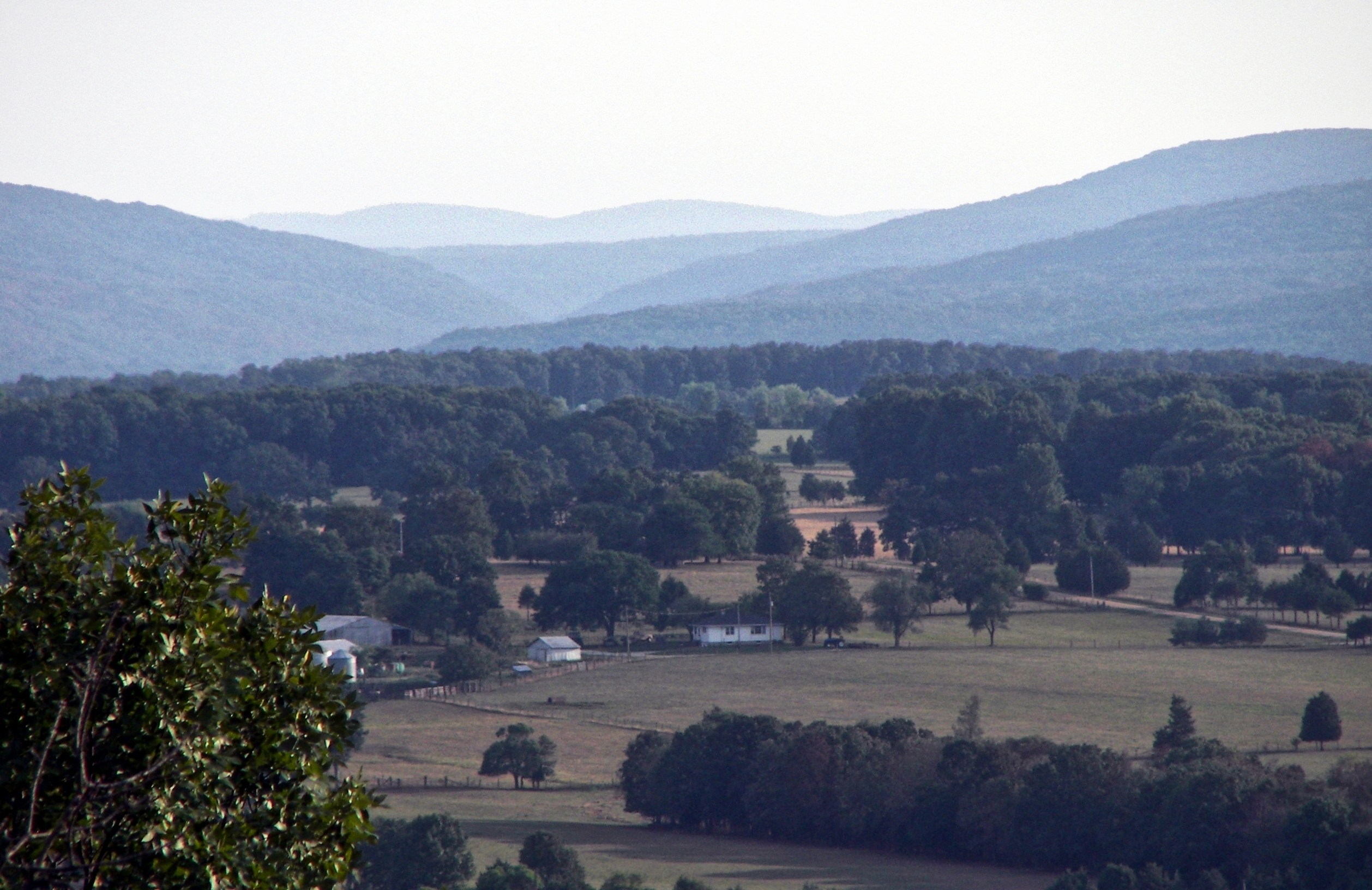
- View from Knob Lick Mountain

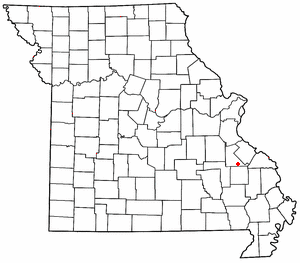
- Location of Knob Lick in Missouri
- Coordinates: 37°40′42″N 90°22′04″W
- Country: United States
- State: Missouri
- County: Saint Francois

Area
  - Total: 0.99 sq mi (2.57 km^{2})
  - Land: 0.99 sq mi (2.57 km^{2})
  - Water: 0 sq mi (0.00 km^{2})
- Elevation: 948 ft (289 m)

Population (2020)
  - Total: 147
  - Density: 148/sq mi (57.1/km^{2})
- Postal code: 63651
- FIPS code: 29-39170
- GNIS feature ID: 2806425

Knob Lick is an unincorporated community in southern Saint Francois County, Missouri, United States. It is located on Missouri Route DD, just east of U.S. Route 67, approximately eight miles south of Farmington.

Knob Lick has a post office with zip code 63651, which has been in operation since 1870. The community takes its name from nearby Knob Lick Mountain. In the Ozarks, knob typically refers to an isolated summit, and lick is a natural "salt lick" or salt spring. The mountain is across U.S. Route 67 from the town at 37°39′52″N 90°23′09″W. Eighty (80 acres (32 ha)) of the summit are protected by the Missouri Department of Conservation. A gravel road leads to the conservation area which includes a granite glade, picnic facilities, and a closed fire lookout tower.

== Demographics ==
Historical population
| Census | Pop. | Note | %± |
|---|---|---|---|
| 2020 | 147 | | — |
U.S. Decennial Census

Knob Lick first appeared as a census designated place in the 2020 U.S. census.

== Notable people ==
- Tom Bayless (born 1947), American football player
