= Fredericktown, Missouri =

- City
- Downtown Fredericktown Fredericktown Railway Depot Madison County Courthouse

- Location in Madison County and the state of Missouri
- Coordinates: 37°33′52″N 90°17′56″W
- Country: United States
- State: Missouri
- County: Madison
- Incorporated: 1827

Area
  - Total: 4.49 sq mi (11.64 km^{2})
  - Land: 4.32 sq mi (11.20 km^{2})
  - Water: 0.17 sq mi (0.44 km^{2})
- Elevation: 699 ft (213 m)

Population (2020)
  - Total: 4,429
  - Density: 1,024.0/sq mi (395.36/km^{2})
- Time zone: UTC-6 (Central (CST))
  - Summer (DST): UTC-5 (CDT)
- ZIP code: 63645
- Area code: 573/235
- FIPS code: 29-25768
- GNIS feature ID: 2394816
- Website: www.fredericktownmo.org

Fredericktown is a city in and the county seat of Madison County, Missouri, United States, in the northeastern foothills of the St. Francois Mountains. The population was 4,429 at the 2020 census, up from 3,985 in 2010. The city is surrounded on three sides (east, west, and south) by the easternmost parcel of the Mark Twain National Forest.

== History ==
=== Exploration ===
The history of Fredericktown revolves around the history of lead mining. The earliest beginnings of Fredericktown occurred around 1715 when local Indians guided French explorers to the area, which at that time was part of Upper Louisiana, in order to show them sources of lead which the French had hoped would also contain silver.

The French governor of Louisiana, Antoine Laumet de La Mothe, sieur de Cadillac, failed to find silver, but succeeded in recruiting other French investors in the Company of the West, organized in 1717, to exploit the mineral resources of Louisiana.

=== Early settlement ===
The earliest European settlement in the area near what is now Fredericktown was Mine La Motte, a small community about 6 miles (10 km) to the north. Mine La Motte was first settled by Europeans to mine a large vein of galena (lead ore) distributed in dolomite that reached the surface there. The need for a local source of lead for ammunition made Mine La Motte one of the earliest European settlements in the interior of the North American continent. Another earlier settlement was the French Catholic community of Saint Michel, which is located just north of the current Fredericktown site on the other side of Saline Creek.

After the Louisiana Purchase in 1803, the Americanization of the area began in earnest with an influx of second and third generation German Reformed Church settlers from Bollinger County, the next county eastward. Other American settlers were drawn to the area as well, including Moses Austin, founder of the American settlement in Texas, who mined for lead between 1800 and 1820 before going on to Texas. In 1818, the area was organized to form Madison County. The name was chosen to honor James Madison, who had been the two-term president of the United States up until two years earlier (from 1809 to 1817), and who had handled the Louisiana Purchase as Secretary of State for Thomas Jefferson. At the time that Madison County was organized, the land south of Saline Creek was owned by Col. Nathaniel Cook. A new town was laid out on Col. Cook's higher, less flood-prone land, and named "Fredericktown" in honor of Col. Cook's close friend from Bollinger County, Col. George Frederick Bollinger.

=== 2021 Tornado ===
On October 24, 2021, the city was impacted by a destructive EF3 tornado.

=== 2024 Battery plant fire ===
On October 30, 2024, the Critical Mineral Recovery (CMR) battery plant experienced a fire, causing explosions within the building. Residents north and east of Fredericktown were told to evacuate. The plant is said to be one of the largest Lithium-ion battery facilities in the world. Two days after the fire, thousands of dead fish were found along 2.5 mile stretches of Village Creek and St. Francis River, believed to be killed by PFAS ingredients in firefighting foam. CMR was recently acquired by Evolution Metals and intends to rebuild and expand lithium mining operations in the area, as does U.S. Strategic Metals.

=== Historic sites ===
The Fredericktown Courthouse Square Historic District, Fredericktown Missouri Pacific Railroad Depot, Fredericktown United States Post Office, Madison County Courthouse, and St. Louis, Iron Mountain and Southern Railroad Depot are listed on the National Register of Historic Places.

== Geography ==
Fredericktown is in northern Madison County in the valley of the Little St. Francis River, a west-flowing tributary of the St. Francis River. U.S. Route 67 runs along the western border of the city, leading north 18 miles (29 km) to Farmington and south 65 miles (105 km) to Poplar Bluff. Missouri Route 72 passes through the north side of Fredericktown, leading east 41 miles (66 km) to Jackson and west 20 miles (32 km) to Ironton.

According to the U.S. Census Bureau, the city of Fredericktown has a total area of 4.50 square miles (11.65 km^{2}), of which 4.33 square miles (11.21 km^{2}) are land and 0.17 square miles (0.44 km^{2}), or 3.78%, are water. City Lake, a reservoir on the Little St. Francis River, is in the northern extent of the city.

Black Mountain is 12 miles (19 km) southwest of Fredericktown. Highway E runs along the base of Black Mountain, beside the St. Francis River. While Black Mountain is only the 42nd highest point (above sea level) in Missouri, the mountain has the largest difference in elevation from the base to the summit. The St. Francis River, at the base of Black Mountain, is approximately 540 feet above sea level. The summit of Black Mountain is 1,502 feet above sea level, which is a difference of approximately 962 feet. In contrast, Taum Sauk Mountain, the highest point in Missouri, only rises about 700 feet from its base, because it rises from an already elevated plain. Taum Sauk is the highest mountain in Missouri; Black Mountain is the tallest.

=== Climate ===
Climate data for Fredericktown, Missouri (1991–2020 normals, extremes 1962–present)
Month	Jan	Feb	Mar	Apr	May	Jun	Jul	Aug	Sep	Oct	Nov	Dec	Year
Record high °F (°C)	74 (23)	83 (28)	87 (31)	93 (34)	94 (34)	108 (42)	109 (43)	109 (43)	100 (38)	92 (33)	85 (29)	75 (24)	109 (43)
Mean daily maximum °F (°C)	41.6 (5.3)	46.9 (8.3)	56.8 (13.8)	68.1 (20.1)	76.1 (24.5)	84.1 (28.9)	87.9 (31.1)	87.0 (30.6)	80.1 (26.7)	69.0 (20.6)	56.0 (13.3)	45.1 (7.3)	66.6 (19.2)
Daily mean °F (°C)	31.2 (−0.4)	35.3 (1.8)	44.4 (6.9)	54.8 (12.7)	64.0 (17.8)	72.3 (22.4)	76.2 (24.6)	74.6 (23.7)	66.9 (19.4)	55.3 (12.9)	44.2 (6.8)	34.7 (1.5)	54.5 (12.5)
Mean daily minimum °F (°C)	20.8 (−6.2)	23.7 (−4.6)	31.9 (−0.1)	41.6 (5.3)	51.9 (11.1)	60.5 (15.8)	64.6 (18.1)	62.2 (16.8)	53.8 (12.1)	41.6 (5.3)	32.4 (0.2)	24.4 (−4.2)	42.4 (5.8)
Record low °F (°C)	−24 (−31)	−17 (−27)	−6 (−21)	12 (−11)	24 (−4)	34 (1)	42 (6)	36 (2)	23 (−5)	16 (−9)	3 (−16)	−18 (−28)	−24 (−31)
Average precipitation inches (mm)	2.96 (75)	2.78 (71)	3.82 (97)	5.27 (134)	5.32 (135)	3.56 (90)	4.01 (102)	3.90 (99)	3.47 (88)	3.29 (84)	4.60 (117)	3.32 (84)	46.30 (1,176)
Average snowfall inches (cm)	2.8 (7.1)	3.2 (8.1)	1.0 (2.5)	0.0 (0.0)	0.0 (0.0)	0.0 (0.0)	0.0 (0.0)	0.0 (0.0)	0.0 (0.0)	0.1 (0.25)	0.3 (0.76)	1.9 (4.8)	9.3 (24)
Average precipitation days (≥ 0.01 in)	8.4	7.8	9.8	10.1	11.4	7.8	8.6	7.6	6.9	7.5	8.3	8.7	102.9
Average snowy days (≥ 0.1 in)	1.5	1.7	0.5	0.0	0.0	0.0	0.0	0.0	0.0	0.0	0.2	1.2	5.1
Source: NOAA

== Geology ==
Fredericktown is nearly unique in the United States for the variety of minerals and metals that have been found and commercially mined nearby, including lead, iron, copper, silver, cobalt, nickel, zinc, tungsten, and small amounts of gold, all of which have been mined at various times within 20 miles (32 km) of the town. The mines immediately east of the town, in what has been called the Old Lead Belt, were at one time one of the largest sources of lead in the United States. One of the oldest, and possibly the oldest, lead mines on the North American continent can be found six miles (10 km) north, in Mine La Motte. While little or no iron has ever been mined in Madison County, very large deposits of mostly hematite with associated magnetite exist 20 miles (32 km) to the west in Iron County. These deposits have been mined since at least Civil War times.

West of Fredericktown but still within Madison County is the Silver Mines Recreation Area, which is situated along a steep river gorge of the St. Francis River. This area contains the ruins of both a 1920s silver mine and a World War II era tungsten mine. Examples of the minerals that were once mined can still be found in the abundant tailings on the south side of the St. Francis River, just downstream of a now-breached stone dam. They consist of metallic-appearing sulfides such as sphalerite, arsenopyrite, and marcasite embedded in opaque veins of quartz. Careful searchers can also find crystals of wolframite, a tungsten ore that was mined briefly during World War II when access to other sources was cut off, and small grains of topaz, which caused the earlier silver miners of the area considerable economic grief by wearing out their diamond-tipped drills more quickly than anticipated. Both highly magnetic magnetite and slightly magnetic ilmenite (titanium ore) grains can be found in patches of black sands left along the beach of the main swimming area.

Madison County also contains unique igneous rocks not found anywhere else, such as Devonite, a colorful decorative stone found only in a single igneous intrusion dike on Mount Devon.

== Demographics ==
Historical population
Census	Pop.	Note	%±
1890	917		—
1900	1,577		72.0%
1910	2,632		66.9%
1920	3,124		18.7%
1930	2,954		−5.4%
1940	3,414		15.6%
1950	3,696		8.3%
1960	3,484		−5.7%
1970	3,799		9.0%
1980	4,036		6.2%
1990	3,950		−2.1%
2000	3,928		−0.6%
2010	3,985		1.5%
2020	4,429		11.1%
U.S. Decennial Census

=== 2020 census ===
As of the 2020 census, Fredericktown had a population of 4,429. The median age was 37.8 years. 23.6% of residents were under the age of 18 and 19.5% of residents were 65 years of age or older. For every 100 females there were 91.6 males, and for every 100 females age 18 and over there were 88.0 males age 18 and over.

95.9% of residents lived in urban areas, while 4.1% lived in rural areas.

There were 1,701 households in Fredericktown, of which 31.7% had children under the age of 18 living in them. Of all households, 40.0% were married-couple households, 17.1% were households with a male householder and no spouse or partner present, and 34.4% were households with a female householder and no spouse or partner present. About 32.1% of all households were made up of individuals and 15.4% had someone living alone who was 65 years of age or older.

There were 1,907 housing units, of which 10.8% were vacant. The homeowner vacancy rate was 3.7% and the rental vacancy rate was 9.0%.

Racial composition as of the 2020 census
Race	Number	Percent
White	4,019	90.7%
Black or African American	39	0.9%
American Indian and Alaska Native	35	0.8%
Asian	24	0.5%
Native Hawaiian and Other Pacific Islander	0	0.0%
Some other race	68	1.5%
Two or more races	244	5.5%
Hispanic or Latino (of any race)	163	3.7%

=== 2010 census ===
As of the census of 2010, there were 3,985 people, 1,669 households, and 995 families residing in the city. The population density was 920.3 inhabitants per square mile (355.3/km^{2}). There were 1,902 housing units at an average density of 439.3 per square mile (169.6/km^{2}). The racial makeup of the city was 96.41% White, 0.28% Black or African American, 0.55% Native American, 0.58% Asian, 0.05% Native Hawaiian or Pacific Islander, 1.20% from other races, and 0.93% from two or more races. Hispanic or Latino of any race were 1.83% of the population.

There were 1,669 households, of which 30.9% had children under the age of 18 living with them, 41.3% were married couples living together, 13.7% had a female householder with no husband present, 4.6% had a male householder with no wife present, and 40.4% were non-families. 36.1% of all households were made up of individuals, and 18.4% had someone living alone who was 65 years of age or older. The average household size was 2.31 and the average family size was 2.97.

The median age in the city was 38.6 years. 24.4% of residents were under the age of 18; 9.2% were between the ages of 18 and 24; 23.2% were from 25 to 44; 23% were from 45 to 64; and 19.9% were 65 years of age or older. The gender makeup of the city was 46.3% male and 53.7% female.

=== 2000 census ===
As of the census of 2000, there were 3,928 people, 1,625 households, and 1,010 families residing in the city. The population density was 919.9 inhabitants per square mile (355.2/km^{2}). There were 1,817 housing units at an average density of 425.5 per square mile (164.3/km^{2}). The racial makeup of the city was 97.76% White, 0.20% African American, 0.33% Native American, 0.59% Asian, 0.41% from other races, and 0.71% from two or more races. Hispanic or Latino of any race were 0.69% of the population.

There were 1,625 households, out of which 28.6% had children under the age of 18 living with them, 45.8% were married couples living together, 12.7% had a female householder with no husband present, and 37.8% were non-families. 34.4% of all households were made up of individuals, and 21.7% had someone living alone who was 65 years of age or older. The average household size was 2.28 and the average family size was 2.89.

In the city, the population was spread out with 23.2% under the age of 18, 8.8% from 18 to 24, 24.1% from 25 to 44, 19.4% from 45 to 64, and 24.6% who were 65 years of age or older. The median age was 40 years. For every 100 females, there were 78.1 males. For every 100 females age 18 and over, there were 71.7 males.

The median income for a household in the city was $21,354, and the median income for a family was $27,149. Males had a median income of $27,593 versus $16,729 for females. The per capita income for the city was $13,512. About 17.4% of families and 22.3% of the population were below the poverty line, including 31.4% of those under age 18 and 14.1% of those age 65 or over.

== Local government ==
Fredericktown is divided into three wards. Each ward has two aldermen who serve terms of two years each. In each ward, the alderman are elected in alternate years. The alderman, the mayor and several elected and appointed city officers form the city council. The mayor presides over the meetings, and votes only in the event of a tie. The mayor is elected to a two-year term in each even year. As of 2024, the mayor of Fredericktown is Travis Parker, and the aldermen are Paul Brown and Eddie Shankle in Ward I, Rick Polete and Bill Long in Ward II, and Jim Miller and Kevin Jones in Ward III.

== Education ==
Fredericktown R-I School District operates three schools, one middle school, one intermediate, and one high school.

Fredericktown has a public library, a branch of the Ozark Regional Library.
