= Madison County, Missouri =

County in Missouri, United States

- County
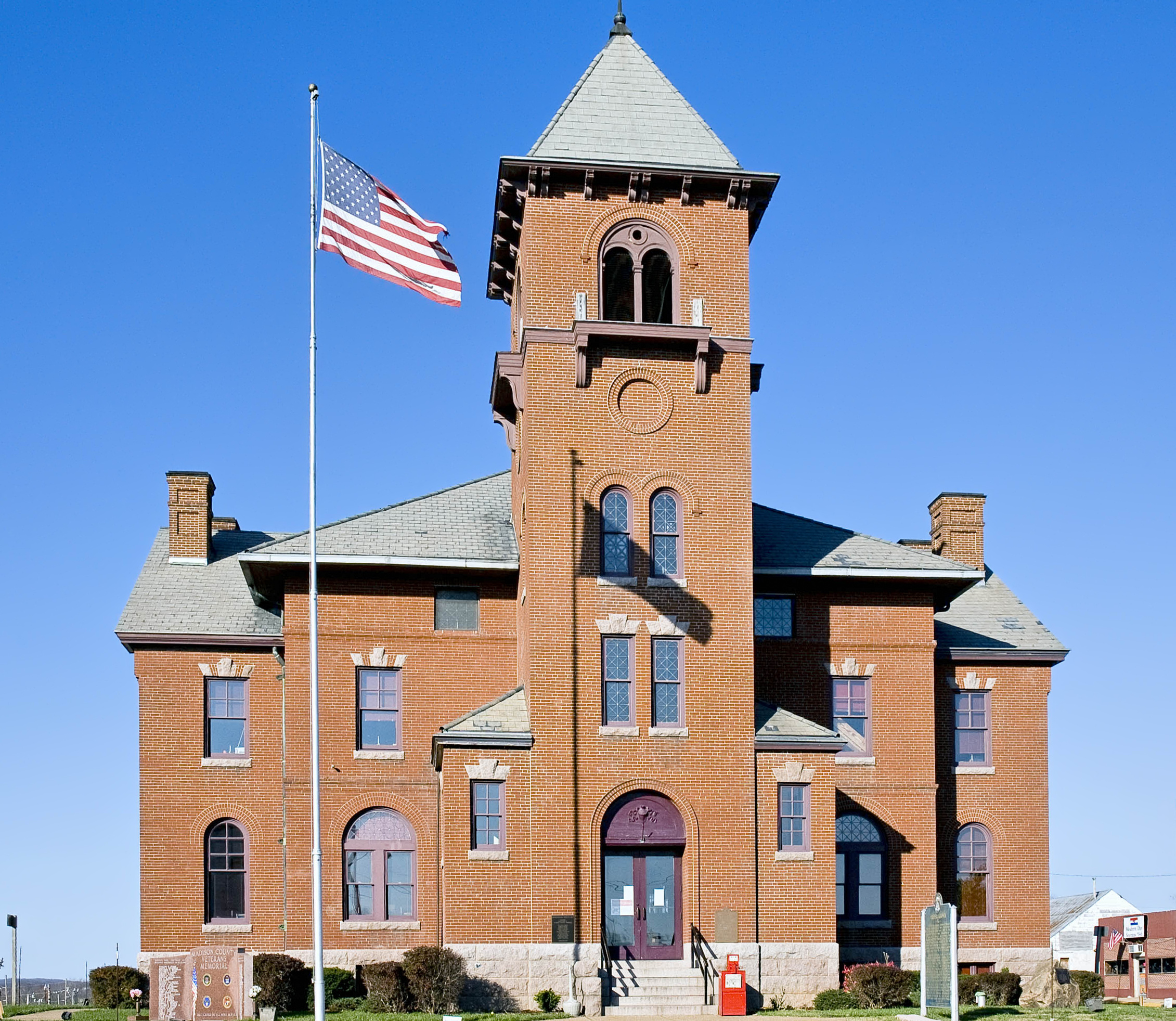
- Madison County Courthouse in Fredericktown

- Location within the U.S. state of Missouri
- Coordinates: 37°29′N 90°20′W
- Country: United States
- State: Missouri
- Founded: December 14, 1818
- Named for: James Madison
- Seat: Fredericktown
- Largest city: Fredericktown

Area
  - Total: 498 sq mi (1,290 km^{2})
  - Land: 494 sq mi (1,280 km^{2})
  - Water: 3.2 sq mi (8.3 km^{2}) 0.6%

Population (2020)
  - Total: 12,626
  - Estimate (2025): 12,858 ▲
  - Density: 25/sq mi (9.7/km^{2})
- Time zone: UTC−6 (Central)
  - Summer (DST): UTC−5 (CDT)
- Congressional district: 8th
- Website: madisoncountymo.us

Madison County is a county located in the Lead Belt region of the U.S. state of Missouri. As of the 2020 census, the population was 12,626. Its county seat and largest city is Fredericktown. The county was officially organized on December 14, 1818, and was named after President James Madison. Mining has been a key industry in this area with Madison County recorded as having the oldest lead mine west of the Mississippi River. During the 1925 tri-state tornado, farm buildings were destroyed and livestock were killed.

== Geography ==
According to the U.S. Census Bureau, the county has a total area of 498 square miles (1,290 km^{2}), of which 494 square miles (1,280 km^{2}) is land and 3.2 square miles (8.3 km^{2}) (0.6%) is water.

=== Adjacent counties ===
- St. Francois County (north)
- Perry County (northeast)
- Bollinger County (east)
- Wayne County (south)
- Iron County (west)

=== Major highways ===
- U.S. Route 67
- Route 72

=== National protected area ===
- Mark Twain National Forest (part)

== Demographics ==
Historical population
Census	Pop.	Note	%±
1820	2,047		—
1830	2,371		15.8%
1840	3,395		43.2%
1850	6,003		76.8%
1860	5,664		−5.6%
1870	5,849		3.3%
1880	8,876		51.8%
1890	9,268		4.4%
1900	9,975		7.6%
1910	11,273		13.0%
1920	10,721		−4.9%
1930	9,418		−12.2%
1940	9,656		2.5%
1950	10,380		7.5%
1960	9,366		−9.8%
1970	8,641		−7.7%
1980	10,725		24.1%
1990	11,127		3.7%
2000	11,800		6.0%
2010	12,226		3.6%
2020	12,626		3.3%
2025 (est.)	12,858	▲	1.8%
U.S. Decennial Census; 1790-1960 1900-1990; 1990-2000 2010-2015

=== 2020 census ===
As of the 2020 census, the county had a population of 12,626 and a median age of 42.2 years. 22.8% of residents were under the age of 18 and 19.8% of residents were 65 years of age or older. For every 100 females there were 97.8 males, and for every 100 females age 18 and over there were 96.3 males age 18 and over.

The racial makeup of the county was 92.0% White, 0.4% Black or African American, 0.5% American Indian and Alaska Native, 0.4% Asian, 0.0% Native Hawaiian and Pacific Islander, 1.1% from some other race, and 5.6% from two or more races. Hispanic or Latino residents of any race comprised 2.7% of the population.

The following table details the county's racial and ethnic composition from that data set.

Madison County, Missouri – Racial and ethnic composition Note: the US Census treats Hispanic/Latino as an ethnic category. This table excludes Latinos from the racial categories and assigns them to a separate category. Hispanics/Latinos may be of any race.
Race / Ethnicity (NH = Non-Hispanic)	Pop 1980	Pop 1990	Pop 2000	Pop 2010	Pop 2020	% 1980	% 1990	% 2000	% 2010	% 2020
White alone (NH)	10,619	10,988	11,552	11,781	11,555	99.01%	98.75%	97.90%	96.36%	91.52%
Black or African American alone (NH)	5	10	15	32	54	0.05%	0.09%	0.13%	0.26%	0.43%
Native American or Alaska Native alone (NH)	14	32	29	34	49	0.13%	0.29%	0.25%	0.28%	0.39%
Asian alone (NH)	26	34	33	41	41	0.24%	0.31%	0.28%	0.34%	0.32%
Native Hawaiian or Pacific Islander alone (NH)	x	x	0	1	0	x	x	0.00%	0.01%	0.00%
Other race alone (NH)	14	1	12	3	22	0.13%	0.01%	0.10%	0.02%	0.17%
Mixed race or Multiracial (NH)	x	x	93	90	563	x	x	0.79%	0.74%	4.46%
Hispanic or Latino (any race)	47	62	66	244	342	0.44%	0.56%	0.56%	2.00%	2.71%
Total	10,725	11,127	11,800	12,226	12,626	100.00%	100.00%	100.00%	100.00%	100.00%

39.5% of residents lived in urban areas, while 60.5% lived in rural areas.

There were 5,024 households in the county, of which 29.0% had children under the age of 18 living with them and 25.0% had a female householder with no spouse or partner present. About 27.7% of all households were made up of individuals and 13.4% had someone living alone who was 65 years of age or older.

There were 5,832 housing units, of which 13.9% were vacant. Among occupied housing units, 71.2% were owner-occupied and 28.8% were renter-occupied. The homeowner vacancy rate was 1.8% and the rental vacancy rate was 7.8%.

=== 2000 census ===
As of the census of 2000, there were 11,800 people, 4,711 households, and 3,330 families residing in the county. The population density was 24 people per square mile (9.3 people/km^{2}). There were 5,656 housing units at an average density of 11 units per square mile (4.2/km^{2}). The racial makeup of the county was 98.30% White, 0.13% Black or African American, 0.25% Native American, 0.29% Asian, 0.20% from other races, and 0.83% from two or more races. Approximately 0.56% of the population were Hispanic or Latino of any race.

There were 4,711 households, out of which 31.20% had children under the age of 18 living with them, 57.40% were married couples living together, 10.10% had a female householder with no husband present, and 29.30% were non-families. 25.90% of all households were made up of individuals, and 14.30% had someone living alone who was 65 years of age or older. The average household size was 2.46 and the average family size was 2.93.

In the county, the population was spread out, with 24.60% under the age of 18, 7.90% from 18 to 24, 26.30% from 25 to 44, 23.30% from 45 to 64, and 18.00% who were 65 years of age or older. The median age was 39 years. For every 100 females there were 92.10 males. For every 100 females age 18 and over, there were 87.70 males.

The median income for a household in the county was $30,421, and the median income for a family was $37,474. Males had a median income of $27,670 versus $15,909 for females. The per capita income for the county was $15,825. About 12.80% of families and 17.20% of the population were below the poverty line, including 22.60% of those under age 18 and 16.20% of those age 65 or over.

=== Religion ===
According to the Association of Religion Data Archives County Membership Report (2000), Madison County is a part of the Bible Belt with evangelical Protestantism being the majority religion. The most predominant denominations among residents in Madison County who adhere to a religion are Southern Baptists (37.87%), Independent/Non-Charismatic Churches (17.42%), and National Association of Free Will Baptists (12.10%).

== Education ==
Of adults 25 years of age and older in Madison County, 68.6% possesses a high school diploma while 7.8% holds a bachelor's degree as their highest educational attainment.

=== Public schools ===
- Fredericktown R-I School District - Fredericktown
  - Fredericktown Elementary School (PK-02)
  - Fredericktown Intermediate School (03–05)
  - Fredericktown Middle School (06–08)
  - Fredericktown High School (09–12)
- Marquand-Zion R-VI School District - Marquand
  - Marquand-Zion Elementary School (K-06)
  - Marquand-Zion High School (07–12)

=== Private schools ===
- Faith Christian Academy - Fredericktown

=== Public libraries ===
- Fredericktown Branch Library

== Politics ==
=== Local ===
Both the Republican and Democratic parties split control of the local elected offices in Madison County.

Madison County, Missouri

Elected countywide officials
Assessor	Sue Smallen Yount	Republican
Circuit Clerk	Tenia Hermann	Republican
County Clerk	Donal E. Firebaugh	Democratic
Collector	Debby Boone	Republican
Commissioner (presiding)	Jason Green	Republican
Commissioner (district 1)	Tom Stephens	Republican
Commissioner (district 2)	Larry Kemp	Republican
Coroner	Collin Follis	Democratic
Prosecuting Attorney	M. Dwight Robbins	Republican
Public Administrator	Carol Lachance	Republican
Recorder	Saundra Ivison	Republican
Sheriff	Katy McCutcheon	Democratic
Surveyor	William Douglas McFarland	Democratic
Treasurer	Jessica Stevens	Republican

=== State ===
All of Madison County is a part of Missouri's 145th District in the Missouri House of Representatives and is currently represented by Rick Francis (R-Perryville). The 156th District includes all of Bollinger and Madison counties as well as most of Perry County, Missouri.

Missouri House - District 145 - Madison County (2020)
Party	Candidate	Votes	%	±%
Republican	Rick Francis	4,489	81.4	
Democratic	Mike Lindley	1,026	18.6	

All of Madison County is a part of Missouri's 27th District in the Missouri Senate and is currently represented by State Senator Holly Rehder (R-Scott City). The 27th Senatorial District includes all of Bollinger, Cape Girardeau, Madison, Mississippi, Perry and Scott counties.

Missouri Senate - District 27 - Madison County (2008)
Party	Candidate	Votes	%	±%
Republican	Jason Crowell	2,778	57.31	
Democratic	Linda Sanders	2,069	42.69	

Missouri Senate - District 27 - Madison County (2020)
Party	Candidate	Votes	%	±%
Republican	Holly Rehder	4,307	77.8	
Democratic	Donnie Owens	1,229	26.4	

Past Gubernatorial Elections Results
Year	Republican	Democratic	Third Parties
2024	81.22% 4,598	16.60% 940	2.18% 123
2020	77.09% 4,362	19.90% 1,126	3.01% 170
2016	64.16% 3,405	32.17% 1,707	3.67% 195
2012	46.95% 2,298	50.15% 2,455	2.90% 142
2008	43.13% 2,160	54.29% 2,719	2.58% 129
2004	57.86% 2,819	40.48% 1,972	1.66% 81
2000	50.50% 2,210	46.85% 2,050	2.65% 116
1996	36.82% 1,709	60.51% 2,809	2.67% 124
1992	45.62% 2,289	54.38% 2,728	0.00% 0
1988	63.41% 2,989	36.42% 1,717	0.17% 8
1984	58.94% 2,746	41.06% 1,913	0.00% 0
1980	58.00% 2,889	41.92% 2,088	0.08% 4
1976	50.34% 1,994	49.63% 1,966	0.00% 0

=== Federal ===
Madison County is included in Missouri's 8th Congressional District and is currently represented by Jason T. Smith (R-Salem) in the U.S. House of Representatives. Smith won a special election on Tuesday, June 4, 2013, to finish out the remaining term of U.S. Representative Jo Ann Emerson (R-Cape Girardeau). Emerson announced her resignation a month after being reelected with over 70 percent of the vote in the district. She resigned to become CEO of the National Rural Electric Cooperative.

U.S. House of Representatives - District 8 – Madison County (2012)
Party	Candidate	Votes	%	±%
Republican	Jo Ann Emerson	3,655	74.65	+8.63
Democratic	Jack Rushin	1,106	22.59	−6.72
Libertarian	Rick Vandeven	135	2.76	+1.31

U.S. House of Representatives - District 8 - Special Election – Madison County (2013)
Party	Candidate	Votes	%	±%
Republican	Jason T. Smith	608	59.84	
Democratic	Steve Hodges	323	31.79	
Constitution	Doug Enyart	43	4.23	
Write-In	Thomas Brown	29	2.85	
Libertarian	Bill Slantz	12	1.18	
Write-In	Wayne L. Byington	1	0.10	

U.S. House of Representatives - District 8 – Madison County (2020)
Party	Candidate	Votes	%	±%
Republican	Jason Smith (politician)	4,413	78.9	
Democratic	Kathy Ellis	1,085	19.4	
Libertarian	Tom Schmitz	95	1.7	

=== Political culture ===
United States presidential election results for Madison County, Missouri
Year	Republican		Democratic		Third party(ies)	
Year	No.	%	No.	%	No.	%
1888	685	36.59%	1,118	59.72%	69	3.69%
1892	635	36.45%	1,010	57.98%	97	5.57%
1896	780	38.09%	1,256	61.33%	12	0.59%
1900	881	42.75%	1,153	55.94%	27	1.31%
1904	1,106	49.33%	1,076	47.99%	60	2.68%
1908	1,248	47.29%	1,321	50.06%	70	2.65%
1912	827	37.59%	1,126	51.18%	247	11.23%
1916	1,230	47.84%	1,310	50.95%	31	1.21%
1920	2,023	52.19%	1,830	47.21%	23	0.59%
1924	1,569	48.06%	1,665	51.00%	31	0.95%
1928	2,165	62.02%	1,326	37.98%	0	0.00%
1932	1,428	37.70%	2,347	61.96%	13	0.34%
1936	2,013	46.36%	2,323	53.50%	6	0.14%
1940	2,495	50.87%	2,405	49.03%	5	0.10%
1944	2,277	50.74%	2,203	49.09%	8	0.18%
1948	2,086	45.36%	2,509	54.56%	4	0.09%
1952	2,676	52.98%	2,375	47.02%	0	0.00%
1956	2,763	54.79%	2,280	45.21%	0	0.00%
1960	2,960	61.23%	1,874	38.77%	0	0.00%
1964	1,756	39.25%	2,718	60.75%	0	0.00%
1968	2,164	50.33%	1,521	35.37%	615	14.30%
1972	2,837	66.16%	1,451	33.84%	0	0.00%
1976	1,739	43.59%	2,229	55.88%	21	0.53%
1980	2,618	53.02%	2,231	45.18%	89	1.80%
1984	2,808	60.13%	1,862	39.87%	0	0.00%
1988	2,528	53.75%	2,167	46.08%	8	0.17%
1992	1,673	32.92%	2,501	49.21%	908	17.87%
1996	1,595	34.21%	2,351	50.42%	717	15.38%
2000	2,460	56.25%	1,828	41.80%	85	1.94%
2004	2,905	59.07%	1,972	40.10%	41	0.83%
2008	2,897	57.62%	2,042	40.61%	89	1.77%
2012	3,227	65.46%	1,588	32.21%	115	2.33%
2016	4,102	77.09%	1,005	18.89%	214	4.02%
2020	4,584	80.76%	1,019	17.95%	73	1.29%
2024	4,721	82.06%	986	17.14%	46	0.80%

=== Missouri presidential preference primary (2008) ===
In the 2008 Missouri Presidential Preference Primary, voters in Madison County from both political parties supported candidates who finished in second place in the state at large and nationally.

Former U.S. Senator Hillary Clinton (D-New York) received more votes (a total of 971) in Madison County during the 2008 primaries than any candidate from either party.

== Communities ==
=== Cities ===
- Fredericktown (county seat)

=== Town ===
- Marquand

=== Villages ===
- Cobalt
- Junction City

=== Census-designated places ===
- Cherokee Pass
- Mine La Motte

=== Other unincorporated communities ===
- Allbright
- Buckhorn
- Catherine Place
- Cornwall
- Faro
- French Mills
- Hahns Mill
- Higdon
- Jewett
- Lance
- Millcreek
- Oak Grove
- Roselle
- Saco
- Saint Michel
- Silver Mine
- Tin Mountain
- Twelvemile
- Zion

== See also ==
- National Register of Historic Places listings in Madison County, Missouri
