= National Register of Historic Places listings in Decatur County, Indiana =

Location of Decatur County in Indiana

This is a list of the National Register of Historic Places listings in Decatur County, Indiana.

This is intended to be a complete list of the properties and districts on the National Register of Historic Places in Decatur County, Indiana, United States. Latitude and longitude coordinates are provided for many National Register properties and districts; these locations may be seen together in a map.

There are 10 properties and districts listed on the National Register in the county.

Properties and districts located in incorporated areas display the name of the municipality, while properties and districts in unincorporated areas display the name of their civil township. Properties and districts split between multiple jurisdictions display the names of all jurisdictions.

This National Park Service list is complete through NPS recent listings posted August 29, 2025.

== Current listings ==
	Name on the Register	Image	Date listed	Location	City or town	Description
1	Bromwell Wire Works	Bromwell Wire Works	June 7, 1990 (#90000810)	Junction of 1st and Ireland Sts. 39°20′39″N 85°29′22″W	Greensburg	
2	Champ's Ford Bridge	Champ's Ford Bridge	December 22, 2009 (#09001127)	County Road 100S over Clifty Creek, 2 miles west of Burney; 39°19′12″N 85°40′33″W	Clay Township	
3	Decatur County Courthouse	Decatur County Courthouse	April 27, 1973 (#73000014)	Courthouse Square; 39°20′13″N 85°29′01″W	Greensburg	
4	Greensburg Carnegie Public Library	Greensburg Carnegie Public Library	June 9, 1995 (#95000701)	114 N. Michigan Ave. 39°20′23″N 85°29′09″W	Greensburg	
5	Greensburg Downtown Historic District	Greensburg Downtown Historic District	September 14, 1995 (#95001113)	Roughly the area surrounding the courthouse square 39°20′15″N 85°29′01″W	Greensburg	
6	Bright B. Harris House	Bright B. Harris House	December 28, 2000 (#00001545)	413 N. Franklin St. 39°20′25″N 85°28′59″W	Greensburg	
7	Jerman School	Jerman School	September 15, 2005 (#05001017)	316 W. Walnut St. 39°20′32″N 85°29′13″W	Greensburg	
8	Knights of Pythias Building and Theatre	Knights of Pythias Building and Theatre	March 28, 1978 (#78000028)	215 N. Broadway; 39°20′17″N 85°29′05″W	Greensburg	
9	Strauther Pleak Round Barn	Strauther Pleak Round Barn	June 24, 1993 (#93000557)	Moscow Rd., 0.2 miles east of County Road 100W and north of Greensburg; 39°22′28″N 85°30′01″W	Washington Township	
10	Westport Covered Bridge	Westport Covered Bridge	June 25, 1982 (#82000031)	East of Westport; 39°10′01″N 85°32′47″W	Sand Creek Township	

== See also ==
- List of National Historic Landmarks in Indiana
- National Register of Historic Places listings in Indiana
- Listings in neighboring counties: Bartholomew, Franklin, Jennings, Ripley, Rush, Shelby
- List of Indiana state historical markers in Decatur County
