= List of Indiana state historical markers in Decatur County =

Location of Decatur County in Indiana

This is a list of the Indiana state historical markers in Decatur County.

This is intended to be a complete list of the official state historical markers placed in Decatur County, Indiana, United States by the Indiana Historical Bureau. The locations of the historical markers and their latitude and longitude coordinates are included below when available, along with their names, years of placement, and topics as recorded by the Historical Bureau. There are 5 historical markers located in Decatur County.

== Historical markers ==
Marker title	Image	Year placed	Location	Topics
Decatur County Court House		1980	Southwestern lawn of Courthouse Square along Main Street (State Road 46 in Greensburg; 39°20′13″N 85°29′1″W	Buildings and Architecture, Military
Civil War General John T. Wilder		2001	Northern side of 446 E. Main Street (State Road 46 at the Poplar Street junction in Greensburg; 39°20′13″N 85°28′40″W	Military
Donnell v. State, 1852		2007	150 Courthouse Square in Greensburg; 39°20′13″N 85°29′0″W	African American, Underground Railroad
Escape of Caroline, 1847		2008	4783 E. County Road 280N near Kingston; 39°22′44″N 85°23′18″W	African American, Underground Railroad, Women
Carl Fisher		2014	150 Courthouse Square, Greensburg; 39°20′15″N 85°29′00″W	Transportation; Business, Industry, & Labor; Sports

== See also ==
- List of Indiana state historical markers
- National Register of Historic Places listings in Decatur County, Indiana
