= Annie Laurie Adams Baird =

American missionary

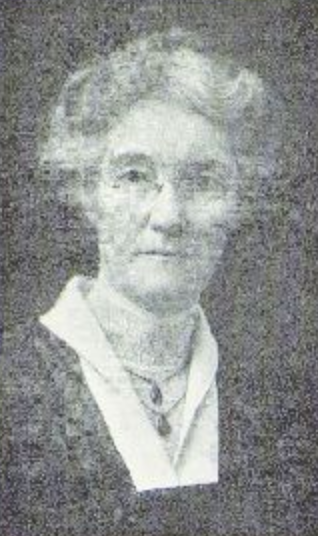
- Annie Laurie Adams Baird, from a memorial pamphlet published after her death in 1916.
- Born: Annie Laurie Adams; September 15, 1864; Greensburg, Indiana
- Died: June 9, 1916 (aged 51); Pyongyang
- Occupations: Missionary, writer, and translator
- Spouse: William M. Baird (m. 1890)
- Children: 5

Annie Laurie Adams Baird (September 15, 1864 – June 9, 1916) was an American Presbyterian missionary in Korea, serving with her husband, Rev. William M. Baird at various stations between 1891 and 1916. She wrote about her work in Daybreak in Korea (1909) and Inside Views of Mission Life (1913).

== Early life ==
Annie Laurie Adams was born in Greensburg, Indiana, the daughter of Jacob Clendenin Adams and Nancy McCoy Adams. She attended Hanover College, graduated from Washburn College, and worked at the YWCA in Topeka as a young woman. Her brother James Edward Adams also became a missionary in Korea.

== Career ==
Baird and her husband were recently married when the Presbyterian Missions Board sent them to Korea to serve as missionaries. They were stationed at Seoul, Busan, and Daegu between 1891 and 1897, and Annie Baird was responsible for working with local women, often welcoming them into her home.

The Bairds moved to Pyongyang in 1897, where William became first president of Soongsil University, a Christian college. Baird assisted her husband as a translator, and wrote several published texts on mission work in Korea, including Daybreak in Korea (1909) Fifty helps for the beginner in the use of the Korean language (1911), and Inside Views of Mission Life (1913). She described a Pyongyang revival meeting as "like hell, uncovered," shocked by the intense public displays of penitence among the Korean converts. Her work was supported in part by the First Presbyterian Church of Topeka.

== Personal life ==
Annie Laurie Adams married William Baird in 1890, just before they left for Korea. They had five sons, including William M. Baird Jr. and Richard Hamilton Baird, who both became missionaries in Korea. Three of her brother's children also served as Presbyterian missionaries in Korea. Her nephew Edward Adams was co-founder and president of Keimyung University.

Annie Laurie Adams Baird died in 1916, aged 51, in Pyongyang. Her papers, her husband's papers, and her brother's papers are in the collection of the Presbyterian Historical Society.
