= Denver Strangler =

American serial killer

- Other names: "Jack the Strangler" "The Strangler of Denver"

Details
- Victims: 3–5
- Span of crimes: 1894–1903
- Country: United States
- State: Colorado
- Date apprehended: Never apprehended
- Imprisoned at: Never captured

The Denver Strangler was an unidentified serial killer operating in Denver, Colorado from 1894 to 1903. He was responsible for killing three prostitutes in the span of 10 weeks in 1894, and although many suspects were arrested, nobody was convicted. The Strangler is also supposedly responsible for the 1898 murder of clairvoyant Julia Voght and 1903 murder of Mabel Brown, but this remains only speculation.

== Murders ==
=== Lena Tapper ===
A French prostitute with a reputation of being "unchaste", Tapper previously lived in Fulda, Minnesota and later Heron Lake, before moving to Denver as the mistress of Richard Demady. Both were part of a secret French order called the Macquereaux, or Les Cavaliers d'Amour, in which Tapper played the role of a sex servant. On September 3, 1894, she was found strangled to death on her bed in her Market Street residence.

=== Marie Contassoit ===
She was also a French prostitute with ties to the Macquereaux, living with her lover Tony Sanders. On the day of her murder, Sanders had fallen asleep while reading a newspaper, and on the following day, Contassoit was found dead in her bed, strangled to death. A small stout cord was so tightly drawn that it was buried into the flesh, with finger marks around her neck. The fact she was considered a wealthier woman, and the fact that she had only 75 cents left on her at the time of death, led authorities to believe that robbery was the motive for the killing. Five men were arrested for her murder, among them Tapper's lover Demady, who had made advances towards her.

Two of the men, Antonio Santopietro and Emil Taymens, were quickly dismissed. Santopietro had previously been dismissed from the police force and worked as a messenger, with Contassoit showing preference towards him. Meanwhile, Taymens, a cook employed by Marie, was described as being jealous of Santopietro. Both were in the house at the time of the murder, but they hadn't heard any disturbance. Both were later released due to lack of evidence.

=== Kiku Oyama ===
A 24-year-old Japanese immigrant, Oyama first came to the USA through Chicago at the time of the World's Columbian Exposition. There she got acquainted with Imi Oyama, a cook, allegedly starting a relationship with him. Both came to Denver in November 1893. A few days prior to her murder, police had raided the local prostitution businesses and arrested several of her associates. Oyama, with the help of a French saloon keeper, secured their release, but the saloon keeper later demanded a monetary sum as a reward for his efforts. This angered Oyama, who quarreled with him about it. Later, one of the released women said that Kiku "made too much talk" about the saloon keeper.

On the evening of November 13, Kiku Oyama was last seen alive. After a short talk with her friends, she returned to her house, drew the curtains and was assumed to have fallen asleep. Her lover Imi had gone out for a walk, and after his return, he found her lying on the bed with a towel around her neck. She was still alive and gasping for air, and despite Imi quickly pulling off the towel, Kiku was on the verge of death. In a panic, Imi ran across the street and called Hana, another Japanese woman, for help. Their behavior attracted the attention of Officer Carberry, who entered the room with them. However, Kiku had already died.

There was heavy indication that a heavy struggle had taken place in the room: the bed sheets were disturbed and covered with blood; a second towel, dampened, laid upon the washstand, and the killer had rifled through the room's drawers, most likely looking for money. Keys for the front and back of the house had also disappeared. Oyama had finger marks near her windpipe, as well as non-lethal bruising on her forehead. She was most likely thrown on her back upon the bed after the towel had been tied to her neck, before being deliberately garroted. Imi Oyama, along with several Japanese women, were arrested on suspicion, but quickly released due to lack of evidence.

=== Suspected murders ===
- Julia Voght - a clairvoyant and medium, Voght lived in an apartment on Champa Street. During the initial murders, she claimed to the authorities that spirits had given her a description of the Strangler while she was in a trance. On October 7, 1898, she was found dead in her apartment, lying on the floor with a towel tied tightly around her neck. It is believed that the Strangler either truly believed she had known something or that he was superstitious, deciding to get rid of her to avoid exposure.
- Mabel Brown - in 1903, nine years after the initial murders, Brown was found dead in her room on Market Street. Her hands had been tied with a pair of suspenders, a handkerchief had been put in her mouth and her throat had strangulation marks. Like the other victims, she was found lying on her bed.

There was also speculation that the Strangler was responsible for other murders, among them the murders of Mary Eckert (July 25, 1894 in Cincinnati, Ohio), Minnie Keldt (May 31, 1894 in New York City, New York) and Josie Bennett (June 30, 1894 in Buffalo, New York). Alfred Knapp was later electrocuted for Eckert's murder, as well as several others, in 1904.

== Suspects ==
=== Richard Demady ===
One of the prime suspects in the case was Frenchman Richard Demady, who lived with Lena Tapper and was also part of the Macquereaux. He was only charged with the death of Tapper, and despite the fact that the evidence was circumstantial, he was considered the most "promising" strangler. The announcement caused great excitement in the country, with the District Attorney's office claiming they could prove that he strangled at the very least Tapper. The detectives even spent hours listening to the mad ravings of Demady's sister, Mme. Fouchette, who was imprisoned at the County Hospital because of her mental illness. Fouchette supposedly went mad from brooding over her brother's arrest, and claimed to see the ghosts of the victims. Whether the prosecutor used any of the information she provided or not is unknown.

A total of 45 witnesses were brought in to testify, among them Laura Johnson, a woman with whom Demady was intimate, who was supposed to give a sensational testimony against him. The prosecution in the case also brought two alleged witnesses, a man and a woman, who claimed to have witnessed Tapper struggling with Demady through their window. The prosecuting attorney claimed to have conclusive proof, including a check written by Demady, which was used to bribe a judge into releasing him.

Despite all the alleged evidence, the jury gave a verdict acquitting Demady of strangling Tapper. After the trial, he moved to Brazil.

=== Frank Roch ===
A married French Canadian roustabout who lived in a small house near Market Street, Roch was arrested by authorities when it was discovered he matched the description of a man running away from the Oyama crime scene shortly after the murder. It was also discovered he had associated with the Macquereaux in the past. However, police quickly realised that even if he knew something about the murders, Roch most certainly wasn't the killer. After a few days, he was released after authorities failed to obtain anything in the form of a confession.

=== H. Meller ===
On November 18, 1894, an Italian man known only as H. Meller (or Moeller) entered the house of Marie Vendres, and after a quarrel, he began strangling the woman. He squeezed her so hard that Vendres was unable to make a sound, but using her strength, she managed to free herself and scream for help. When an officer arrived, Meller was about to cut her throat with a razor.

Despite this event, Police Chief Armstrong and the police in general were skeptical that he was the Strangler. Instead, they just considered that he was a man with an ill temper.

=== Victor Monchereaux ===
An approximately 40-year-old French carpenter with abnormally large hands, Monchereaux first came to the attention of the police after his former friend and fellow Frenchman, Alphonse Lemaire, drunkenly told a story of how he committed the crimes. Lemaire had entered the saloon of a man named Frank Klepfel in a half-drunken state, sitting down at a table and watching an ongoing billiard game, without moving much. Tony Sanders, the lover of the deceased Contassoit who was present at the time and searching for any possible clues, began paying attention to the new arrival. While discussing the strangling cases with a friend, Lemaire began listening to their conversation with great interest.

He eventually addressed Sanders about the cases, asking if he spoke French first. Seeing that he could get a clue from this man, Sanders began listening closely, while Lemaire began drunkenly explaining that it was neither Charles Challou (an associate of Contassoit) or the Italian, but a man he knew. Klepfel and half the men in the saloon also began paying attention, giving Lemaire even more alcohol. The now intoxicated Frenchman finally told the alleged killer's name: Victor Monchereaux. After making several abusive statements towards him, Lemaire began explaining how he was a vicious character and how they met.

The pair initially met while serving time in San Quentin, California, with Monchereaux arriving in Denver in 1893 and Lemaire three months before the murders. According to Lemaire, Victor strangled all the women with the use of chloroform and then stole all the money they owned. Not only that, but he had also planned to kill another woman by the name of Xavier, using a long plank which he would place in the small back yard to get across. Escape would be easy, as the gate had no lock on it. Monchereaux almost entered the house, but he then heard footsteps in the alley and was frightened off. The Xavier woman was shocked, but didn't report the matter to the police.

=== Alphonse Lemaire ===
Despite his sensational story, authorities couldn't entirely believe Lemaire's story, as Monchereaux himself later accused him of being the strangler with a similar story. Although police considered that neither of the prisoners were responsible and were simply pawns of the Macquereaux, for a short while, they began suspecting that it was actually Lemaire who might be the strangler.

According to Monchereaux's account, the vagabond sailor Lemaire arrived in Denver from Salt Lake City under his real name, Charles Guichard. After meeting him in prison, Victor travelled to Denver and began searching for a job as a watchman. In this time, Lemaire was arrested by Sanders after his story, shortly followed by Monchereaux. In prison, Victor claimed that it was Alphonse who killed the women using chloroform and a towel, to steal their money.

His story was partially corroborated by J. W. Williams, a black hod carrier, who had caught up to the men while walking on Market Street and eavesdropped on their conversation. He heard one of the men say "I did it", but couldn't discern who it was. Monchereaux then continued to claim that after each murder, Lemaire would come to him, telling about how he had done "another job". After the Contassoit murder, he alleged that Alphonse had disposed of the chloroform and everything else that could put suspicion on him. And two days after the Oyama murder, they met for the last time, with Lemaire confessing to killing all the women and claiming he intended to kill some more. He also remarked about "doing [his] work clean."

== See also ==
- Denver Prostitute Killer - another unidentified serial killer active from 1975 to 1995
- List of fugitives from justice who disappeared
- List of serial killers in the United States

== Bibliography ==
- O'Hare, Sheila; Dick, Alphild (2012). Wicked Denver: Mile-High Misdeeds and Malfeasance. Wicked. The History Press. ISBN 978-1-61423-667-2.
- McQueen, K. (2019). Weird Wild West: True Tales of the Strange and Gothic. Indiana University Press. ISBN 978-0-253-04370-2.
