= Senator Hendricks =

Senator Hendricks may refer to:

== Members of the United States Senate ==
- Thomas A. Hendricks (1819–1885), U.S. Senator from Indiana from 1863 to 1869
- William Hendricks (1782–1850), U.S. Senator from Indiana from 1825 to 1837

== United States state senate members ==
- Francis Hendricks (1834–1920), New York State Senate
- Thomas Hendricks Sr. (1773–1835), Indiana State Senate
- William Hendricks Jr. (1809–1850), Indiana State Senate

== See also ==
- Senator Hendrick (disambiguation)
