= Greensburg Downtown Historic District =

Greensburg Downtown Historic District or Downtown Greensburg Historic District may refer to:

- Greensburg Downtown Historic District (Greensburg, Indiana)
- Downtown Greensburg Historic District (Greensburg, Kentucky)
- Greensburg Downtown Historic District (Greensburg, Pennsylvania)
