= I34 =

I34 may refer to:

- Greensburg Municipal Airport, in Decatur County, Indiana
- Japanese submarine I-34, a Type B1 submarine of the Imperial Japanese Navy
- Inhibitor I34, a protease inhibitor
