= Denver Prostitute Killer =

Unidentified American serial killer and rapist

- Penalty: Life imprisonment

Details
- Victims: 17–27
- Span of crimes: 1975–1995
- Country: United States
- State: Colorado

The Denver Prostitute Killer was an American serial killer responsible for the murder of at least 17 women and girls in Denver and its various suburbs between 1975 and 1995. In 2005, based upon results from DNA profiling, it was determined that the most likely killer was Billy Edwin Reid who was previously arrested and charged with the 1989 murder of Lannell Williams and Lisa Kelly. Reid was convicted and sentenced to life imprisonment for those specific murders. The killings were grouped together only in 2008 – until then, each of these crimes was considered to have been committed by different people.

== Murders ==
The killer chose young girls and women, aged 15–25, as his victims, most of whom went missing in different areas in Denver and were later found dead. A common pattern was for them to be hitchhikers, to have visited bars or fast food restaurants, and a majority of them being engaged in prostitution. The victims were beaten and strangled, and their bodies dumped in the countryside along Interstate 70. Some of the bodies were posed in humiliating positions. According to investigators, the offender is responsible for the murder of 18-year-old Karolyn Walker, who disappeared on July 4, 1987, after meeting with her fiancé. After being kidnapped she was raped and strangled, the strangler threw her body into a ravine. During the course of the investigation, police found no incriminating evidence or witnesses, and that Walker likely resisted fiercely, as she was a good swimmer, did gymnastics and had considerable physical strength.

Other victims include 17-year-old prostitute Kimberly Jean Grabin, who was found raped and strangled on August 18, 1979, near the I-70; 15-year-old Stephanie Ann Bauman, who went missing in October 1980 after hitchhiking to her home. Her naked body was found in a ravine on the outskirts of Denver on October 28. She had been beaten and tortured, after which she lapsed into unconsciousness. The attacker then threw her into a ravine, where Bauman soon died from hypothermia . 18-year-old Donna Wayne went missing on July 14, 1986, after visiting a bar with her friends. Her body was found a month later in the vicinity of Aurora.

In all of the killings, the murderer had the same modus operandi, and it is supposed that he committed seven similar murders in Denver, five in Jefferson County and one in Larimer County.

== Investigation ==
Since the bodies of many of the Prostitute Killer's victims were found at various stages of decomposition, any fingerprints or biological traces of the suspect could not be located quickly enough, and therefore, the killer's identity is still unknown. A local resident, who was about 30 at the time of the first killings and knew the neighborhood well, was declared a suspect, but never charged. In two instances, police found witnesses who described the criminal as a middle-aged white male.

In 2005, based upon results from DNA profiling, 52-year-old Billy Edwin Reid was arrested and charged with the 1989 murders of Lannell Williams and Lisa Kelly. Reid was convicted and sentenced to life imprisonment. He is suspected of committing several more murders, including some committed by the Denver Prostitute Killer, but no evidence incriminating him has been located.

Another possible suspect is Vincent Groves, a man linked to several murders in Denver almost two decades after his death. According to the Denver Police Department, Groves could have been responsible for more than 20 murders of young girls and women in the area, around the same time frame when the Prostitute Killer was active.

== See also ==
- Denver Strangler - another unidentified serial killer active from 1894 to 1903
- List of serial killers in the United States
