= Decatur County Airport =

Decatur County Airport may refer to:

- Greensburg-Decatur County Airport in Greensburg, Indiana, United States (FAA: I34)
- Decatur County Industrial Air Park in Bainbridge, Georgia, United States (FAA: BGE)
- Scott Field (Tennessee), also known as Decatur County Airport, a former airport in Parsons, Tennessee, United States (FAA: 0M1)
