= WTRE =

WTRE may refer to:

- WTRE (AM), a radio station (1330 AM) licensed to serve Greensburg, Indiana, United States
- WEGT (FM), a radio station (89.9 FM) licensed to serve Greensburg, Indiana, which held the call sign WTRE-FM from 2012 to 2019
