= Greensburg Race Riot =

Racially motivated violence against Black Americans in Greensburg, Indiana, 1907

The Greensburg Race Riot occurred in Greensburg in the U.S. state of Indiana in 1907, after a Black man named John Green was arrested for assaulting a white woman. It resulted in the establishment of Greensburg as a sundown town.

== Background of the riot ==
Greensburg is a town located in Decatur County, Indiana, and is also known as Tree City. It was chosen as a county seat in 1822 and named Greensburg by Thomas Hendrick’s wife who had come from Greensburg, Pennsylvania. At the turn of the century, less than three percent of Indiana’s population was Black. The population of Greensburg in 1900 was 5,034, and one source estimated that at the time of the riot in 1907, there were 6,500 white people and 150 Black people living there.

At the beginning of the 20th century, Indiana remained segregated, and Greensburg’s Black citizens maintained their own separate community within the city. They faced intense racial prejudice, discrimination, and hostility from their white neighbors. In 1902, Black citizens of Greensburg were forced to flee the city. According to the Encyclopedia of American Race Riots, white politicians and citizens introduced and encouraged “an atmosphere of lawlessness” by allowing an illicit saloon to exist in the Black section of Greensburg, which fueled criminal activity and violence in the community.

Location of Greensburg in Decatur County, Indiana.

== 1907 riot ==
The race riot began April 30, 1907, after a Black man named John Green was arrested on suspicion of assaulting and robbing a white woman by the name of Caroline Sefton. Green was tried and convicted of the attack. He was moved out of Greensburg after his safety was threatened. A mob still formed, and several Black people in Greensburg were attacked and Black families were forced out of the town. Newspapers from the time state that the riot began with a group of three to four men attacking a Black-owned grocery store. White rioters then embarked on a rampage in the Black section of the city, “shooting and torching homes, destroying businesses, and beating blacks at random.” Nobody was killed, but several people were injured, and the riot resulted in thousands of dollars in damages.

The newspapers then stated that the mob grew to 500 people and report that six Black men were attacked. According to journalists at the time, the riot stopped when officers announced that every Black resident would be driven out of town.

== Aftermath ==
After the riot in 1907, Greensburg became a sundown town. The white population drove out the Black community and posted signs stating, “don’t let the sun set on your back in Decatur County,” that were up until well after World War II. No participants in the riot were ever held accountable. At least 200 other towns in Indiana became sundown towns between 1890 and 1940, although there could have been more. The former mayor of Greensburg, Gary Herbert, denied the race riot happened and that the Black community had been driven out of town when speaking to reporters in 2007. In 2017, The Greensburg Daily News published a story about the history of the 1907 riots which included extensive quotes from newspapers at the time of the riot. The article, which was titled "Greensburg 1907 Riot; Correcting a Possible Wrong," did not, however, fully acknowledge the white community's responsibility for the riots and their aftermath, acknowledging only that there was a "possible wrong" committed against the town's Black citizens.
