= Kim Kyeong-ryang =

South Korean footballer (born 1973)

Kim Kyeong-Ryang
Personal information
- Full name: Kim Kyeong-Ryang
- Date of birth: 22 December 1973 (age 52)
- Place of birth: South Korea
- Position: Midfielder

Team information
- Current team: Jeonbuk Hyundai Motors (U-18 team head coach)

Youth career
- Soongsil University

Senior career*
Years	Team	Apps	(Gls)
1996–2006	Jeonbuk Hyundai Motors	194	(1)
2007	Team Wellington		

Managerial career
- 2012–: Jeonbuk Hyundai Motors U-18
- * Club domestic league appearances and goals

Kim Kyeong-Ryang (Korean: 김경량; born 22 December 1973) is a South Korean retired footballer who played as a midfielder. He is a head coach of Jeonbuk Hyundai U-18.
