= Billy Edwin Reid =

American murderer and suspected serial killer

- Mugshot
- Born: 1959 (age 66–67)
- Convictions: First degree murder (2 counts); Aggravated sexual assault
- Penalty: Life imprisonment

Details
- Victims: 2–21
- Span of crimes: 1989 (known); 1975 – 1995 (suspected)
- Country: United States
- State: Colorado
- Date apprehended: 2006
- Imprisoned at: Sterling Correctional Facility

Billy Edwin Reid (born 1959) is an American murderer and a suspect in the murders of at least 17 women in Denver, Colorado between 1975 and 1995. The murders were grouped together only in 2008, before then they were thought to have been committed by different perpetrators. In 2005, based upon results from DNA profiling, Reid was tied to the 1989 murders of Lannell Williams and Lisa Kelly, and authorities suspect him in more.

== Case History ==
=== Initial murders ===
In 2006, Reid was arrested at his home in Denver, and was charged with the murder of Lenell Williams, after investigators successfully identified a match in his DNA to traces of biological evidence found at the crime scene. Her body was found in a humiliating position on October 14, 1989, near Clear Creek by two East High School students.

After further examination, they also charged him for the murder of Lisa Kay Kelly, a sex worker whose badly decomposed body was found on March 24, 1989, on a mountain side. She remained unidentified for 17 years until a partial fingerprint found on her body matched that of Kelly, who had been missing since 1988. In addition, officials also speculated that Reid killed Queena Sanders in 1988. At the time of the murders, Reid was a transient who is known to have traveled extensively between California and Colorado. In 2008, Reid was convicted of killing Williams and Kelly after a jury verdict, and days later he was sentenced to life imprisonment plus 48 years.

=== Suspected murders ===
Between 1975 and 1995, the bodies of 27 sex workers were found scattered across Denver areas, but most found dumped along Interstate 70 in humiliating positions. The murders were all thought to be unconnected until 2008. Reid became a suspect after being convicted, as the murders he was responsible for happened in between the prostitute murders.

Since the bodies were found at various stages of decomposition, any fingerprints or biological traces of the suspect could not be located quickly enough, therefore even if Reid was sought after in the deaths, no DNA evidence could conclusively tie him to them. His victims matched the victim profile of the prostitute killer, as Reid's were prostitutes and drug addicts, as were the prostitute killer's. Witnesses who are reported to have seen the killer described him as a middle-aged white male, despite Reid being a younger black man at the time of the murders. As of 2021, Reid has been faced with no new charges.

== See also ==
- List of serial killers in the United States
- Denver Prostitute Killer
