= William M. Baird =

William Martyn Baird was an American Presbyterian missionary who founded Soongsil University in Korea.

Baird was born in Indiana on June 16, 1862. He was educated at Hanover College (Bachelor's degree in 1885, PhD in 1903, and Doctor of Divinity in 1913) and McCormick Theological Seminary (graduated 1888). Baird sailed to Korea to do missionary work, arriving in 1891, less than two months after marrying Annie Laurie Adams (December 18, 1890). His first missionizing was in Busan in September of the same year.

Beginning with a "Sarangbang" class in Pyeongyang in 1897, Baird's efforts grew into the Soongsil School in 1900 and eventually into an institution of higher education, graduating its first students in 1908. He died in 1931. Baird Hall on the Soongsil campus is named after him, and there is a bronze bust of him there as well.

== Archival collections ==
The Presbyterian Historical Society in Philadelphia, Pennsylvania has a collection of Dr. William Baird's diaries and correspondence that document, among other events, his early years as a missionary in Korea and the death of his first wife, Annie Laurie Baird, in 1916.

The Society also holds a collection of the Baird Family papers, which consists of correspondence and photographs of Dr. Baird, his brother Richard, and his wife Anna.
