= Senator Hendrick =

Senator Hendrick may refer to:

- Howard Hendrick (born 1954), Oklahoma State Senate
- John K. Hendrick (1849–1921), Kentucky State Senate
- Lloyd Hendrick (1908–1951), Louisiana State Senate

== See also ==
- Senator Hendricks (disambiguation)
