= Ezekiel J. Ingersoll =

American businessman and politician

Member of the Illinois House of Representatives
- In office 1895–1896

Personal details
- Born: November 18, 1836 Greensburg, Indiana, U.S.
- Died: February 26, 1925 (aged 88) Carbondale, Illinois, U.S.
- Party: Republican
- Occupation: Politician, businessman

Military service
- Allegiance: United States
- Rank: Captain
- Unit: 73rd Illinois Infantry Regiment
- Battles/wars: American Civil War

Ezekiel J. Ingersoll (November 18, 1836 – February 26, 1925) was an American businessman and politician.

Ingersoll was born in Greensburg, Indiana. In 1838, he moved to Paris, Illinois, with his family. In 1859, Ingersoll moved to Carbondale, Illinois, and was involved with the jewelry business. He served in the 73rd Illinois Infantry Regiment during the American Civil War and was commissioned captain. After the war, he returned to Carbondale and resumed his jewelry business. Ingersoll served as mayor of Carbondale. He also served on the board of education and was a Republican. Ingersoll served in the Illinois House of Representatives in 1895 and 1896. He served on the Southern Illinois University Carbondale Board of Trustees. Ingersoll died at his home in Carbondale, Illinois, after suffering a stroke.
