= Bromwell Wire Works =

- U.S. National Register of Historic Places
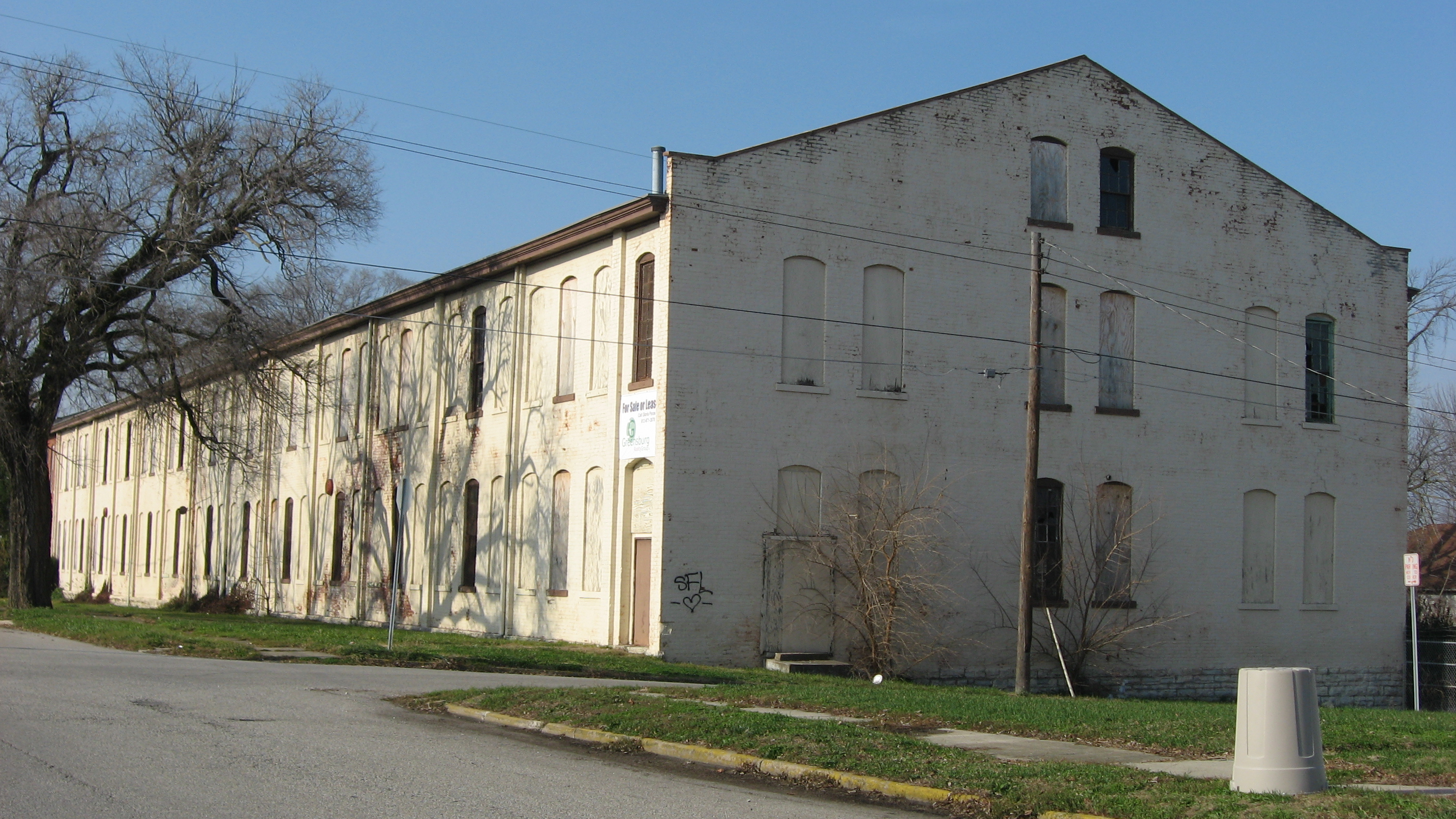
- Bromwell Wire Works, December 2011

- Location within Indiana Location within the United States
- Location: Jct. of First and Ireland Sts., Greensburg, Indiana
- Coordinates: 39°20′39″N 85°29′22″W
- Area: 4 acres (1.6 ha)
- Built: 1903
- Architect: Pulse & Porter
- Architectural style: Late 19th And Early 20th Century American Movements, Victorian Functional
- NRHP reference No.: 90000810
- Added to NRHP: June 7, 1990

Bromwell Wire Works is a historic industrial complex located at Greensburg, Indiana. The original factory was built in 1903, and is a two-story brick building on a rock-faced ashlar foundation and with a gable roof. It has a heavy timber-frame structure and Victorian style detailing. Also on the property are the contributing 1 1/2-story brick boiler house (c. 1903), water tower (1928), and galvanizing shop (1922).

It was added to the National Register of Historic Places in 1990.
