= Presbyterian Historical Society =

Historical society in the United States

Coordinates: 39°56′35″N 75°09′00″W

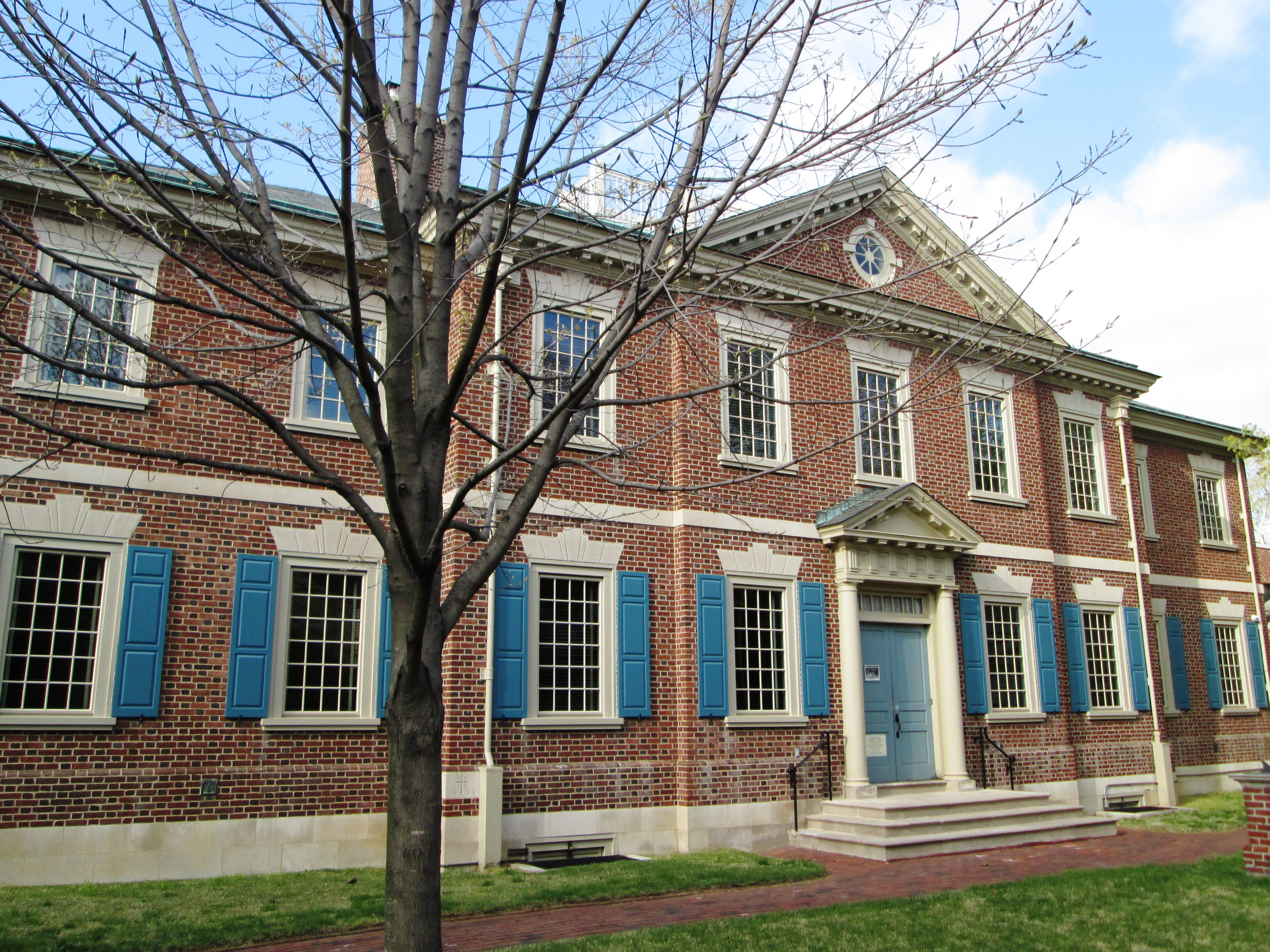
- "Where History Lives"
- Location: Philadelphia, Pennsylvania, United States of America
- Type: private archive
- Established: 1852; 174 years ago

Collection
- Size: 32,000 cubic feet of archival records

Other information
- Director: Nancy Taylor
- Website: www.history.pcusa.org

The Presbyterian Historical Society (PHS) is the oldest continuous denominational historical society in the United States. Its mission is to collect, preserve and share the history of the American Presbyterian and Reformed tradition with the church and broader community. It is a department of the Office of the General Assembly of the Presbyterian Church (U.S.A.).

Located in Philadelphia, Pennsylvania, the Historical Society holds about 32,000 cubic feet of archival records and personal papers; about 250,000 monographs, serials, and rare books; and a museum collection that includes approximately 250 paintings and over 25,000 communion tokens. The Society's address is 425 Lombard Street in Philadelphia's historic Society Hill district.

The Presbyterian Historical Society is governed by a Board of Directors, which sets strategic directions for the Society, provides oversight, ensures financial stability and advocates and promotes the work of the Society within the Presbyterian Church (U.S.A.). It has EIN 23–6431364 as a 501(c)(3) Public Charity.

== History ==
The Presbyterian Historical Society was organized on May 20, 1852, at the General Assembly meeting of the (Old School) Presbyterian Church in the U.S.A. in Charleston, South Carolina. Concerned over the permanent loss of historical records, Old School Board of Education Secretary Cortland Van Rensselaer helped to orchestrate the Society's creation. The Society's original mission was to “collect and preserve materials, and to promote the knowledge of the history of the Presbyterian Church in the United States of America.”

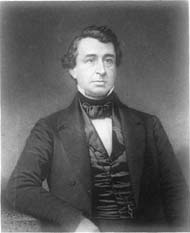
Photograph of Cortlandt Van Rensselaer

The first president of the Society was Cortlandt Van Rensselaer. The Society was located in Philadelphia, which is where the first presbytery in America was formed in 1706. Local businessman Samuel Agnew served as the Society's first librarian and treasurer. From the start, the Society took an ecumenical approach to collecting, inviting all branches of the Presbyterian and Reformed traditions to participate.

At its 1853 General Assembly meeting, the Old School denomination approved transfer of the historical documents in its possession to the newly formed Presbyterian Historical Society. The Society's first location was 821 Chestnut Street at the denomination's Board of Publication building. By 1864, the Society's collections had grown to 3,000 volumes, 8,000 pamphlets and 300 portraits. In 1870, the library moved up the street to the corner of Eleventh and Chestnut Streets. It now had 20,000 pamphlets and 500 portraits in its collection. In addition, the society received 600 church histories in 1876 as part of the denomination's wider efforts to celebrate the United States centennial.

In 1879, the society moved again, this time to Race Street. Mr. Agnew, the society's first librarian and an avid collector of Presbyterian documents, died before he could see the new building. In 1890, William C. Cattell, formerly of Lafayette College, was named the new president of the Society. The Society moved from Race Street to the Witherspoon Building in April 1897. The Witherspoon Building, at Walnut and Juniper Streets, was built by the Board of Publication for its own needs as well as a space for a “New Presbyterian House.” The Society now had a library space, storage area, librarian's office and a conference room.

It was also during Cattell's tenure in 1893 that the Society hired its first support staff person, a female clerk to assist in cataloging the holdings. Cattell was replaced in 1898 by Dr. Henry McCook. McCook was a Presbyterian Pastor, a noted entomologist, a writer of historical novels, a scholar of architecture and heraldry, and a member of the “Fighting McCooks of Ohio” who served the Union during the Civil War.

In 1901, McCook helped to establish a publication for the Society called The Presbyterian Journal. It was later renamed The Journal of the Presbyterian Historical Society and it is the oldest denominational, historical publication in the United States.

By 1911, the collection size had grown to 20,000 volumes and 50,000 pamphlets. The Society at that time was maintained by annual dues from its members. Despite a constant push for new membership, this did not prove a sustainable form of finance for the Society.

Dr. Henry C. McCook in his study (1890)

In 1925, thanks to the support of the PCUSA Stated Clerk Lewis S. Mudge, the Society was designated the Department of History of the Office of the General Assembly of the Presbyterian Church in the U.S.A. After years of poor financing, this move ensured a steady stream of income for the society to continue its work of collection and preservation. It was also through Mudge's involvement that the Historical Society began to use its archives to answer reference questions for the larger denomination and promote itself to the academic community.

During the 1950s, the Society began a publication program to share its collections with the academic world. The first Society publication was Presbyterian Enterprise: Sources of American Presbyterian History edited by Maurice Armstrong, Lefferts A. Loetscher and Charles A. Anderson. Since then, the Society has published other books including American Presbyterians: A Pictorial History by James H. Smylie and All Black Governing Bodies: The History and Contributions of All-Black Governing Bodies in the Predecessor Denominations of the Presbyterian Church (U.S.A.).

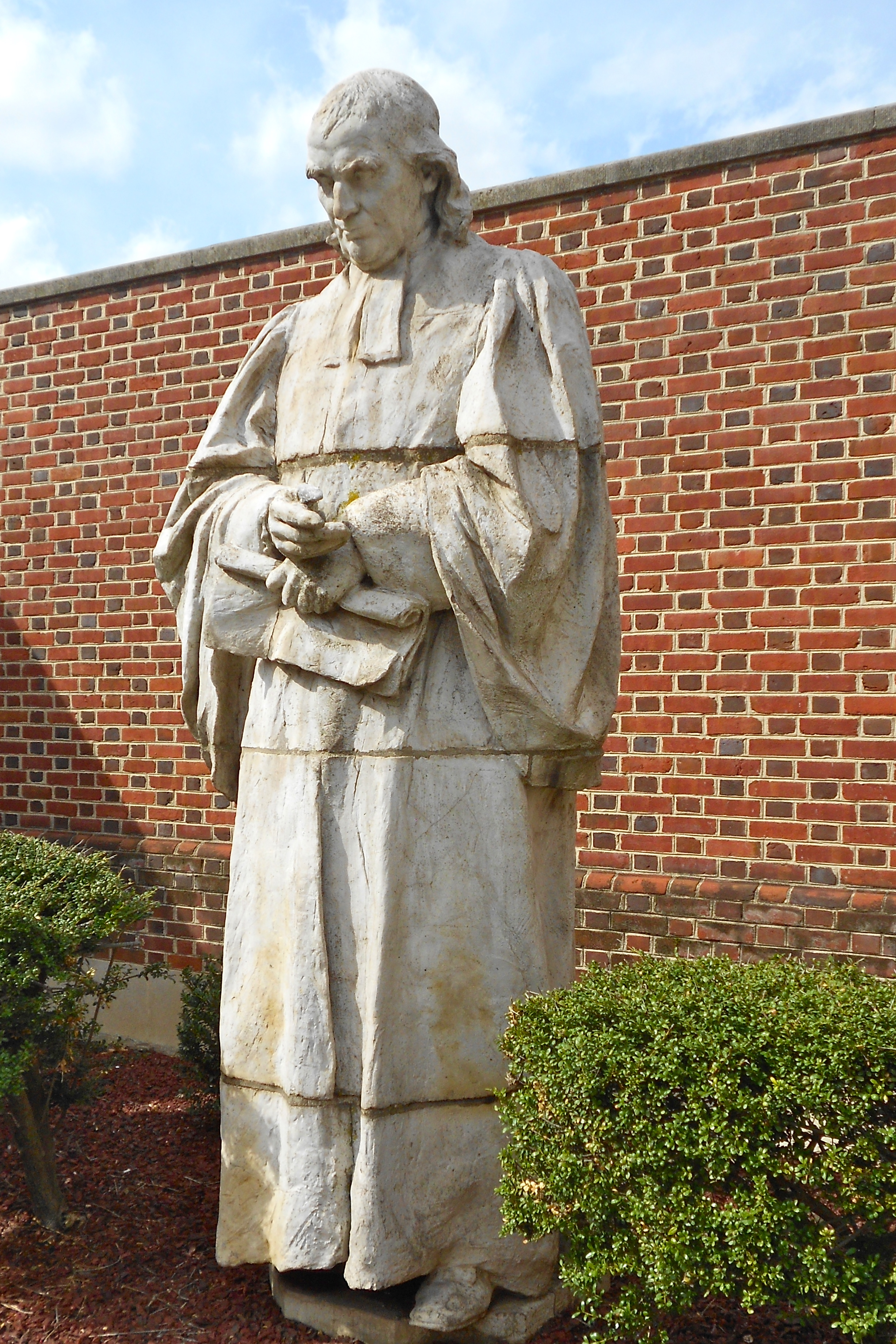
Sculpture of John Witherspoon by Alexander Stirling Calder

In 1960, William B. Miller became the manager for the Society. Under his leadership, the minutes of the General Assembly were microfilmed and made available for sale. With the help and assistance of Stated Clerk Eugene Carson Blake, Alexander Mackie and the Friends of Old Pine Street Church, a new building for the Historical Society was planned.

The society moved to its current home, in 1967. In front of the building are large stone statues designed by Alexander Stirling Calder that were originally part of the façade of the Witherspoon Building. They represent prominent figures in American Presbyterianism: John Witherspoon, James Caldwell, Samuel Davies, Francis Makemie, John McMillan and Marcus Whitman.

In 1983, the United Presbyterian Church in the U.S.A. and the Presbyterian Church in the U.S. combined to form the Presbyterian Church (U.S.A.). The Presbyterian Historical Society and the PCUS Historical Foundation in Montreat, North Carolina, merged in 1988. In 2006, the Montreat office closed and many of the collections stored in Montreat moved to Philadelphia, while others were transferred to Columbia Theological Seminary and other archival institutions.

Some of the noteworthy collections the Presbyterian Historical Society possesses include the personal library and correspondence of Sheldon Jackson, a pioneering missionary in Alaska and the West during the late nineteenth century. The society also owns the personal library of Rev. John D. Shane which includes invaluable information about pioneer life in Kentucky and the Mississippi Valley before the Civil War.

Another noteworthy collection is the American Indian Correspondence: the Presbyterian Historical Society Collection of Missionaries Letters, 1833–1893, which includes correspondence from Presbyterian missionaries who served Native Americans. The Society also holds a manuscript of the sermon delivered by Phineas Densmore Gurley in the East Room of the White House during Abraham Lincoln's Funeral.

Recent collections of note at the Society include records of the National Council of the Churches of Christ in the U.S.A. The NCC is an ecumenical organization made up of 29 Protestant, Anglican and Orthodox denominations.

In 1989, Miller retired and was succeeded by Dr. Frederick J. Heuser Jr. Dr. Heuser retired as director in 2013, to be succeeded by the Rev. Dr. Beth Hessel. In May 2019, Hessel resigned to take a similar position with the Athenaeum of Philadelphia. She was replaced by Nancy Taylor. Under Taylor's leadership during the pandemic, the Historical Society expanded its capacity to take in and preserve digital materials, issued a Black Lives Matter statement, and launched a biweekly Zoom series featuring PHS staff speaking on various topics.

The Historical Society has an annual intake of 500 cubic feet of archival material each year. The Society also answered over 3,600 reference inquiries on holdings and services in 2015.

== Current services ==
The Presbyterian Historical Society is a department of the Office of the General Assembly of the PC(USA) and fulfills the recordkeeping responsibilities of all General Assembly entities. It achieves this goal by housing and servicing valuable records of the denomination. The Society also provides step-by-step records management programs for all levels of the denomination, including synods, presbyteries and congregations.

The Historical Society provides information on how to protect vital records from disaster and improve filing systems through its records management program. The program provides retention schedules and advice on managing and preserving electronic records. The Society can provide a step by step guide to forming a records management program for various levels of the denomination.

The Historical Society also publishes The Journal of Presbyterian History twice a year with articles that document and explore the Presbyterian experience. Many of the articles and book reviews are written by scholars. The Historical Society staff writes the “Our Documentary Heritage” section of the Journal, which illustrates an aspect of Presbyterian history through artifacts and photographs. The staff also produces “On Holy Ground”, which highlights churches, cemeteries or other locations that were awarded a place on the American Presbyterian/Reformed Historic Sites Registry.

The Society's website contains information about some of its holdings through the online catalog, CALVIN, which includes records for over 75,000 books, periodicals, and other archival materials. The website also includes online guides that describe contents of processed archival collections. The society's website also has a searchable database for its Foreign Missionary Personnel Files, Congregation Vertical Files and Biographical Vertical Files.

Also available on the website is Hall's Index of American Presbyterian Congregations, which is a compilation and summary of information on Presbyterian congregations pulled from various sources. The index contains the organization and dissolution dates of churches as well as denomination and location changes, mergers, and other actions.

The Historical Society supports an extensive digital reformatting program. In 2014, the historical society ended its 60-year-microfilming program to target its resources towards digital preservation. In 2015, the historical society's digital preservation lab took 158,000 scans; which includes 88,842 scans of images and paper records and over 68,000 frames of microfilm.

In order to help preserve important denominational records, a discounted rate is available to all PC(USA) entities for digitization. In addition, annual Heritage Preservation Grants that cover up to $500 towards the cost of digital reformatting are available for congregations that are at least 50 years old and have fewer than 250 members.

In 2015, the historical society launched its digital repository, Pearl, in honor of Pearl S. Buck, who was the child of Presbyterian missionaries.

Research Fellowship Grants for scholars, students and independent researchers who need to use the Society's holdings for research are also available. Applicants must demonstrate a need to work in the society's collection for a minimum of one week and a maximum of one month. Applications are accepted from persons whose normal place of residence is farther than a seventy-five mile radius from Philadelphia.

Exhibits are on display in the front lobby that contain materials from the Society's holdings. The Society's website also hosts several online exhibits. An additional exhibit option is traveling displays that may be used at any level of the denomination for special events.

== Society collections ==
The Presbyterian Historical Society holds personal papers on the following prominent individuals:

- Archibald Alexander
- Francis Alison
- William M. Baird
- John Beatty
- Elias Boudinot
- David Brainerd
- Albert Barnes
- Donald Barnhouse
- John Chester
- Samuel Davies
- Jonathan Edwards
- Robert Finley
- Sheldon Jackson
- Maggie Kuhn
- Peter Marshall
- William Sheppard
- John Machen

The Historical Society is also the official repository for the following organizations:

- American and Foreign Christian Union
- American Church in Paris
- American Sunday School Union
- American Waldensian Society
- American Society of Church History
- Federal Council of Churches
- National Council of Churches
- Religious News Service
