= Alfred Knapp =

American serial killer

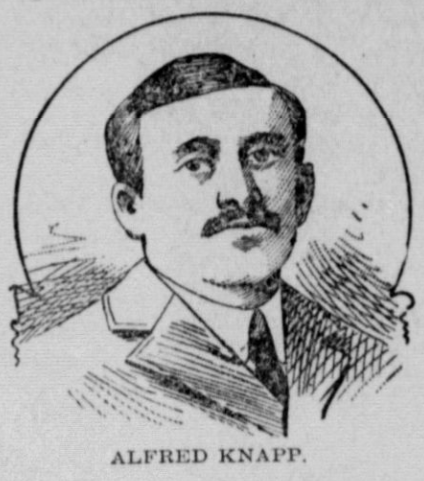
- Sketch of Knapp
- Born: Alfred Andrew Knapp; April 30, 1862; Greensburg, Indiana, U.S.
- Died: August 19, 1904 (aged 42); Ohio State Penitentiary, Columbus, Ohio, U.S.
- Cause of death: Execution by electrocution
- Other names: "The Hamilton Strangler" "The Ohio Strangler" "The Indianapolis Wife Strangler"
- Status: Executed
- Conviction: First degree murder
- Penalty: Death

Details
- Victims: 5+
- Span of crimes: 1894–1902
- Country: United States
- States: Ohio and Indiana
- Date apprehended: February 25, 1903

Alfred Andrew Knapp (April 30, 1862 – August 19, 1904), known as The Hamilton Strangler, was a 19th-century American serial killer responsible for killing at least five women and girls between 1894 and 1902. He was executed for murdering his third wife on August 19, 1904.

== Biography ==
=== Early life ===
Alfred Knapp was born in Greensburg, Indiana, as one two children of Cyrus Knapp (1839–1903) and Susana Knapp (née Hudson, 1840–1918). In his later years, Knapp spent most of his years behind bars in state prisons for brutal assaults on women. Despite this, he had joined the Fourth Christian Church and admitted to the Christian Endeavor Society, where he was described as a man of unassuming manners. At the time of his arrest, he was living with his fourth wife in Indianapolis.

=== Murder of Hannah Knapp ===
On December 21, 1902, Hannah Knapp (née Goddard), Alfred's third wife, suddenly disappeared from her Cincinnati home. That morning, her husband had awoken with a seizing impulse to strangle her. After killing her, Knapp got a box and stuffed the body inside before nailing it up. Knapp then proceeded to haul the body two miles away, dumping it into the Great Miami River.

After her disappearance, Alfred spent several days in Cincinnati, constantly visiting his sister Sadie Wenzel, before suddenly announcing that he was looking for his missing wife. Soon after, he moved back to his previous home in Hamilton and then to Indianapolis. On January 2, 1903, he met Anna May Gamble, whom he soon married on February 4.

On February 25, Knapp was arrested on suspicion that he had murdered his wife. He was returned to Hamilton, where he soon confessed to strangling Hannah before disposing of her in the river. To the surprise of authorities, the following day Knapp confessed to the murder of another four women and a girl, starting from 1894. The murders to which he confessed were of:

- Emma Littleman - murdered in a lumberyard in Cincinnati on June 21, 1894
- Mary Eckert - murdered on Walnut Street in Cincinnati on August 1, 1894
- Jennie Connors Knapp - Alfred's second wife, murdered on Liberty Street in Cincinnati on August 17, 1894
- Ida Gebhard - a child, murdered in Indianapolis in July 1896

Despite his confessions, Knapp was suspected of more murders, as he himself confessed that he had pounced on innocent children and had choked them.

== Trials ==
Knapp's trial was considered a great sensation by the contemporary press and public, transforming him into a sort of "celebrity". While escorted to the courtroom, he was described as talkative, chatting with police officers and was treated with great consideration. As he was without an attorney, his sister Sadie, his only accompanying family member, acted as his defense. Knapp was described as disinterested and uncaring during the trial, while his sister tried to convince the jury that her brother was mentally unstable and that he should be sent to a mental institution. The prosecution had little to no evidence, as during the first trial there were no clues tying him to the murder of his wife, adding to the fact that her body still hadn't been found yet.

On March 3, 1903, however, a woman's nude body was found along the river in New Albany, Indiana. It was quickly confirmed that it was Hannah Knapp's, as the woman had the same jewelry and rings which Mrs. Knapp had worn on the day of her disappearance, as described in her husband Alfred's confession. When confronted with the new discovery, Alfred simply repeated what he had said before.

On March 10, Knapp was subpoenaed to testify as a witness in the trial of a man named Joseph Roth. Roth was suspected of assaulting two little girls named Hattie and Stella Motzer. Despite his denial of any involvement, Alfred was arraigned to testify because of his similarity to Roth, which led some to believe that the two girls had been mistaken.

On July 16, Knapp, whose only defense was insanity, was convicted and sentenced to death without any chance of commutation of the sentence. Despite the verdict severely affecting his sister and mother, Knapp appeared disinterested in the ordeal, as he was quoted three hours after the trial as saying: "I suppose it is all off with me."

On September 2, Judge Belden rejected a motion for a new trial, with Knapp's attorney announcing that he would appeal the verdict. Alfred Knapp was unconcerned during the process, looking at the ceiling the entire time.

On January 4, 1904, Judge Swing from the circuit court granted Knapp a new trial, as there were errors during his first trial. The major error was that the court allowed his written confession to be read to the jury.

On July 22, an appeal was filed on Knapp's behalf by his lawyer, Thomas Darby, to the State Board of Pardons. It was later rejected.

== Execution ==
On August 19, 1904, Alfred Knapp was executed by electric chair in the Ohio Penitentiary. While the execution was being prepared, Knapp provided written confession to the knife attack in the Motzer sisters. He wrote:

“To Whom It May Concern: Joe Roth is innocent of the attack on the Motzer children on September 16, 1902. I done that myself, but there was no intention of committing rape on them. Now, I am doing this to clear Joe Roth’s name. I assaulted them myself. Alfred Knapp.”

Knapp died six minutes after the initial shock. Shortly after his execution, newspapers compared his crimes to those of H. H. Holmes, noting that, unlike Holmes, Knapp appeared to have committed his crimes out of pure diabolical desire to do harm.

== See also ==
- List of serial killers in the United States

== Bibliography ==
- Richard O. Jones (2015). The First Celebrity Serial Killer in Southwest Ohio: Confessions of the Strangler Alfred Knapp. Arcadia. ISBN 978-1467117500.
- Susan Sawyer (2016). Speaking Ill of the Dead: Jerks in Ohio History. Rowman & Littlefield. ISBN 978-1493018925.
