= Knights of Pythias Building and Theatre =

- U.S. National Register of Historic Places
- U.S. Historic district – Contributing property
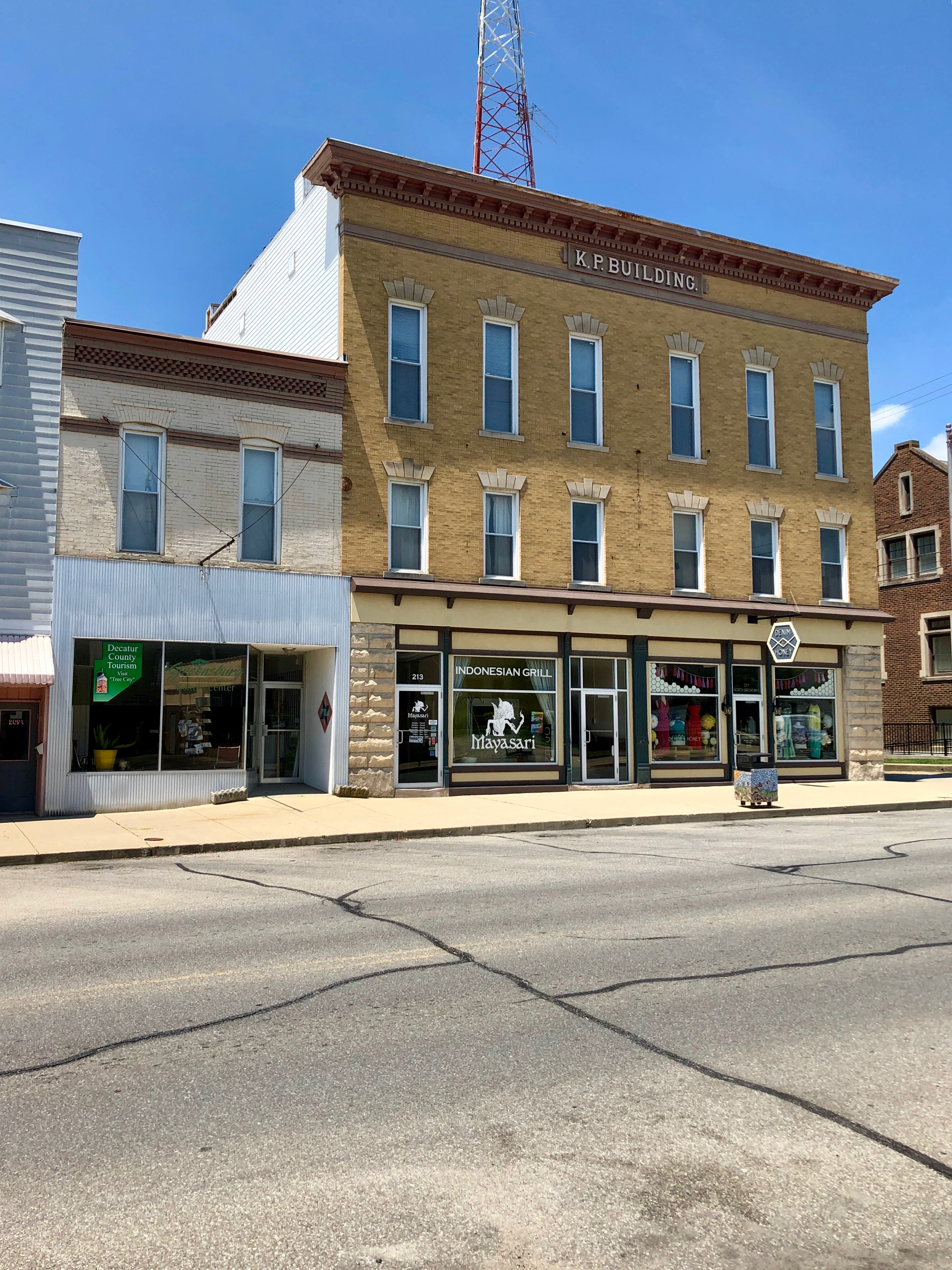
- Principal Facade

- Location within Indiana Location within the United States
- Location: 215 N. Broadway, Greensburg, Indiana
- Coordinates: 39°20′17″N 85°29′5″W
- Area: less than one acre
- Built: 1899, 1908
- Architect: Wood, Colonel
- Architectural style: Early Commercial, Italianate
- Part of: Greensburg Downtown Historic District (ID95001113)
- NRHP reference No.: 78000028
- Added to NRHP: March 28, 1978

The Knights of Pythias Building and Theatre, also known as K. of P. Building, is a historic building located at Greensburg, Indiana. It was built in 1899 by the Knights of Pythias, and is a three-story brick building that includes Early Commercial and Italianate style design elements. A four-story theater was added to the original building in 1908. The theater closed in 1958.

It was added to the National Register of Historic Places in 1978.
