= WTRE (AM) =

Coordinates: 39°19′41″N 85°30′6″W

- Greensburg, Indiana; United States
- Frequency: 1330 kHz
- Branding: Tree Country 1330

Programming
- Format: Country music

Ownership
- Owner: WTRE, Inc.

History
- Call sign meaning: "Tree"

Technical information
- Licensing authority: FCC
- Facility ID: 74124
- Class: D
- Power: 500 watts (day); 33 watts (night)
- Translators: 103.5 W278BB (Greensburg); 104.3 W282AZ (Greensburg)

Links
- Public license information: Public file; LMS
- Webcast: Listen Live
- Website: wtreradio.com

WTRE (1330 kHz) is an AM radio station broadcasting a country music format. Licensed to Greensburg, Indiana, the station is owned by WTRE, Inc.
