= Bright B. Harris House =

Historic house in Indiana, United States

- U.S. National Register of Historic Places
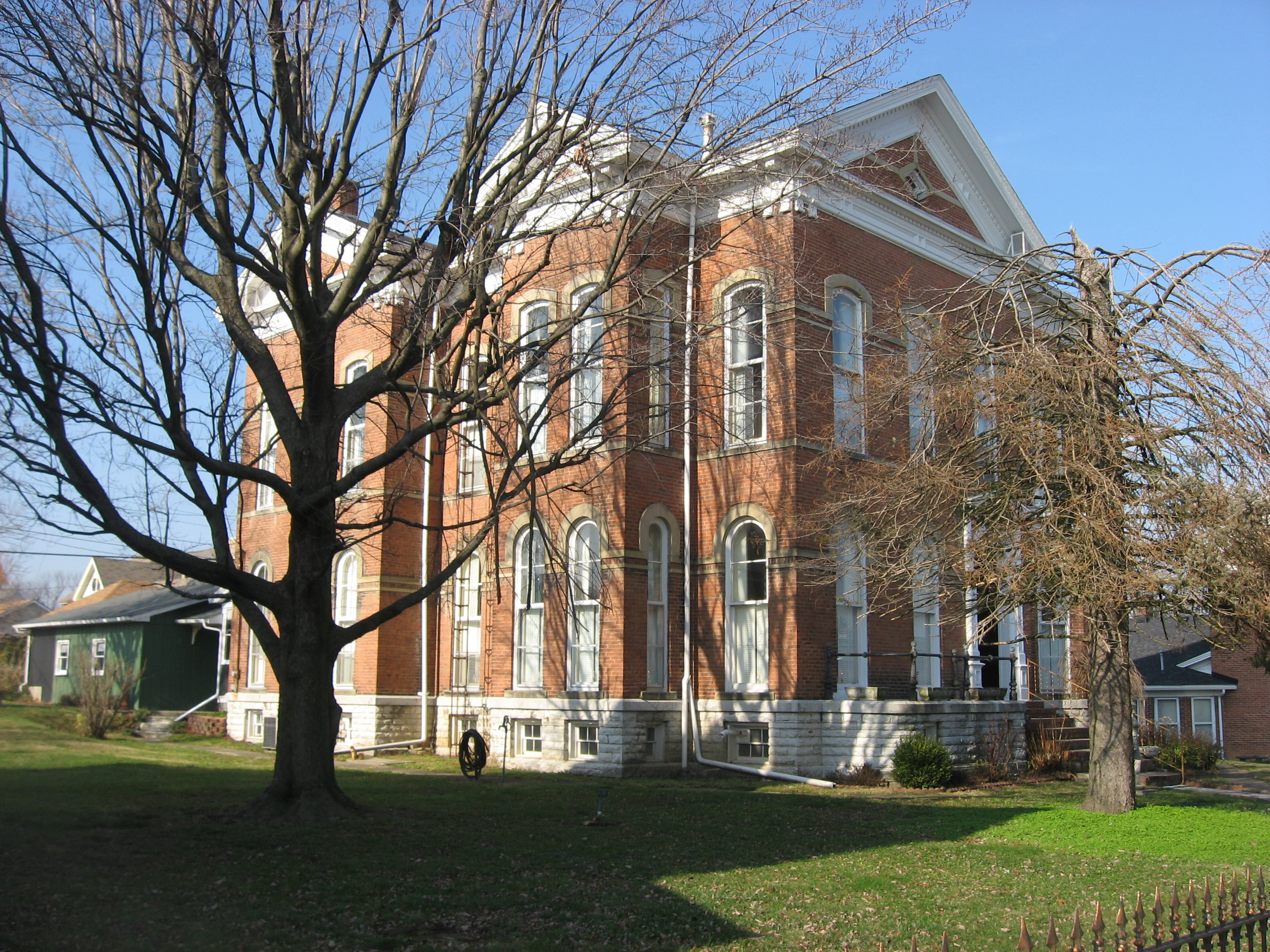
- Bright B. Harris House, December 2011

- Location within Indiana Location within the United States
- Location: 413 N. Franklin St., Greensburg, Indiana
- Coordinates: 39°20′25″N 85°28′59″W
- Area: less than one acre
- Built: 1871
- Architectural style: Italianate
- NRHP reference No.: 00001545
- Added to NRHP: December 28, 2000

Bright B. Harris House is a historic home located at Greensburg, Indiana. It was built in 1871, and is a large 2 1/2-story, Italianate style brick dwelling. It has a low pitched gable and hipped roof, ashlar limestone foundation, and round arched windows.

It was added to the National Register of Historic Places in 2000.
