= Vincent Groves =

American serial killer

- Denver District Attorney's Office c. 1988
- Born: Vincent Darrell Groves; April 19, 1954; Denver, Colorado, U.S.
- Died: October 31, 1996 (aged 42); Denver, Colorado, U.S.
- Convictions: First degree murder Second degree murder (2 counts)
- Penalty: Life imprisonment

Details
- Victims: 8–20+ (3 convictions)
- Span of crimes: 1978–1988
- Country: United States
- State: Colorado
- Date apprehended: September 1, 1988

Vincent Darrell Groves (April 19, 1954 – October 31, 1996) was an American serial killer who murdered at least eight girls and women in the Denver, Colorado, area between 1978 and 1988. His guilt was conclusively proven in four murders with the help of DNA profiling in 2012, 16 years after his death, as a result of which his total victim count remains unknown. According to the Denver Police Department, based on circumstantial evidence and a number of testimonies, Groves could have been responsible for more than 20 murders.

== Early years ==
Vincent Groves was born on April 19, 1954, in the family of a postman and a teacher, the eldest of three sons. The family lived in the western Denver suburb of Wheat Ridge, which was mainly inhabited by members of the upper middle class. Vincent's parents were law-abiding, average citizens who took good care of their children. Groves attended Wheat Ridge High School, which he graduated in 1972, the only black student from his class. One of his classmates was Dave Logan, who would later become a prominent professional football player and coach.

With a tall and athletic physique, Vincent spent his high school years as a member of the school's basketball team, achieving outstanding results on the court. In 1972, his team reached the final in the annual interscholastic basketball championship in the state, with Groves being recognized as the team's star player, thanks to which he was popular and had many friends and acquaintances. After school, he entered Coe College in Cedar Rapids, Iowa, where he played for the local basketball team. However, he quickly lost interest in studying and sports, and in 1974, due to his chronic absences, he dropped out of college and returned to Denver. He moved in with his grandmother and found a job as an electrician at the Gates Rubber Company. In his free time, Groves was fond of drinking alcohol and visiting the red-light districts, as a result of which, in the late 1970s, he spent a lot of time surrounded by pimps and prostitutes, and subsequently began leading a criminal lifestyle.

== Crimes ==
In late 1977, Groves met 17-year-old Jeanette Baca, whom he persuaded to engage in prostitution and became her pimp. On June 11, 1978, Baca's naked body was found in the woodland in Jefferson County. During the investigation, police interrogated Groves, but since there was no evidence of his guilt, he wasn't charged. A few months later, he met 21-year-old Norma Jean Halford, from San Jose, California, who became his cohabitant. On August 24, 1979, a soldier from the army discovered Halford's empty car parked on a mountain road outside of Georgetown. Neither Halford, nor her body, have been located to this day. At the end of 1979, Groves became addicted to drugs. During this period, he met Janett Hill, whom he married in March 1981. Due to his addiction, Vincent began to exhibit volatile behavior, quitting his job at the Gates Rubber Company and finding employment as a janitor with irregular working hours, from which his relationship with Janett became strained. On August 14, 1981, Groves killed 17-year-old Tammy Sue Woodrum while out camping. On the advice from his wife, after committing the murder, Groves surrendered himself at the police station and gave a full confession. He insisted that the girl had died from an overdose, but the autopsy later established that Woodrum had been raped and strangled, and that there were no traces of drugs in her blood. Vincent was charged with second-degree murder, and in the summer of 1982, he was found guilty and received a 12-year sentence. During his imprisonment, he divorced his wife, finished college and went through several programs for rehabilitation of sex offenders. On February 13, 1987, he was paroled and released from prison.

Groves returned to Denver to live with his parents. With the support of his father, Vincent bought a blue AMC Concord and found a job as a janitor, working both at one of the local churches and at a department store. In his spare time, he visited one of the main streets on Colfax Avenue, where prostitution and drug trafficking were beginning to flourish due to social and economic upheavals, with the highest crime rates at the time being recorded. In March 1987, he met 20-year-old prostitute Sheila Washington on Colfax Avenue. Having paid for her services, Groves drove her to a motel, where, after sharing drugs together, he beat and attempted to strangle her. Motel residents overheard noises coming from the room, after which Groves fled the scene. Washington survived the ordeal and managed to describe her assailant and his car, but couldn't give a name, thanks to which Groves avoided detection. In August 1988, Washington identified his car and reported it to the police. At the same time, Groves became a suspect in the murders of more than 20 Denver girls, all of whom had been strangled. The investigators found that Groves was familiar with the victims and was a known drug dealer among the pimps and prostitutes on Colfax Avenue, even being the last person seen with the victims in some cases. Based on circumstantial evidence and testimonies, Vincent Groves was arrested on September 1, 1988, and interrogated. During said interrogation, he categorically denied any involvement and insisted on his innocence. A blood sample was taken from him, and his parents, ex-wife and a number of acquaintances were interrogated. His car and apartments were searched, but no incriminating evidence was found against him, as a result of which he was ultimately charged only with assaulting Sheila Washington. In a lawsuit that opened in early 1989, Groves claimed that he was acting in self-defense, after Washington stole $1,600 and tried to attack him, which was supported by the fact that she had been convicted of cocaine possession at the time. Since he was able to prove that she was a drug addict prone to committing such offenses, in February of that year, Groves was acquitted.

However, he did not go free, because by that time, according to results from a DNA profiling test, Groves was linked to the murders of 19-year-old Juanita Lovato, whose naked body was found in April 1988 in a rural area east of Denver, and 25-year-old Diane Mancera, whose body was found in neighboring Adams County, near the I-25 west of Denver.

== Trial ==
Vincent Groves was convicted of Lovato's killing in 1990, receiving life imprisonment. A month later, he was extradited to Adams County, where he was charged with murdering Diane Mancera. At the end of 1990, he was additionally convicted of her death and received 20 years imprisonment. At the trial, prosecutors provided evidence of his involvement in eight other murders in the Denver area, using testimonies and other evidence that placed Vincent as the last person seen with the victims before they were found dead or disappeared. However, no new charges were brought against him.

== Death ==
In the early 1990s, Vincent Groves began to have health problems. He was diagnosed with Hepatitis C and liver failure, the complications from which he died on October 31, 1996, in a prison hospital near Denver. Shortly before his death, Groves was asked to confess to other murders, but he refused.

== Aftermath ==
In 2012, on the basis of DNA analysis, Groves' guilt was established in the murder of 25-year-old Emma Jenefor, whose body was discovered in Denver in March 1978; 23-year-old Joyce Ramey, who was killed in July 1979; 20-year-old Peggy Cuff, whose body was discovered in November 1979 in Denver, and 35-year-old Pamela Montgomery, who was strangled in August 1988. In 1989, during the trial, Groves was named as a suspect in Montgomery's killing because, during the investigation, a witness was found who identified Vincent as the driver of a car she got into on the day of her disappearance, after which she was found dead.

In 2025, the Douglas County Sheriff's Office announced that Groves was responsible for the 1987 murder of 30-year-old Rhonda Fisher. The breakthrough came from DNA analysis of 38-year-old paper bags preserved around Fisher's hand at the crime scene, which preserved both Fisher's and Groves' DNA.

== See also ==
- List of serial killers in the United States
