= Greensburg Carnegie Public Library =

- U.S. National Register of Historic Places
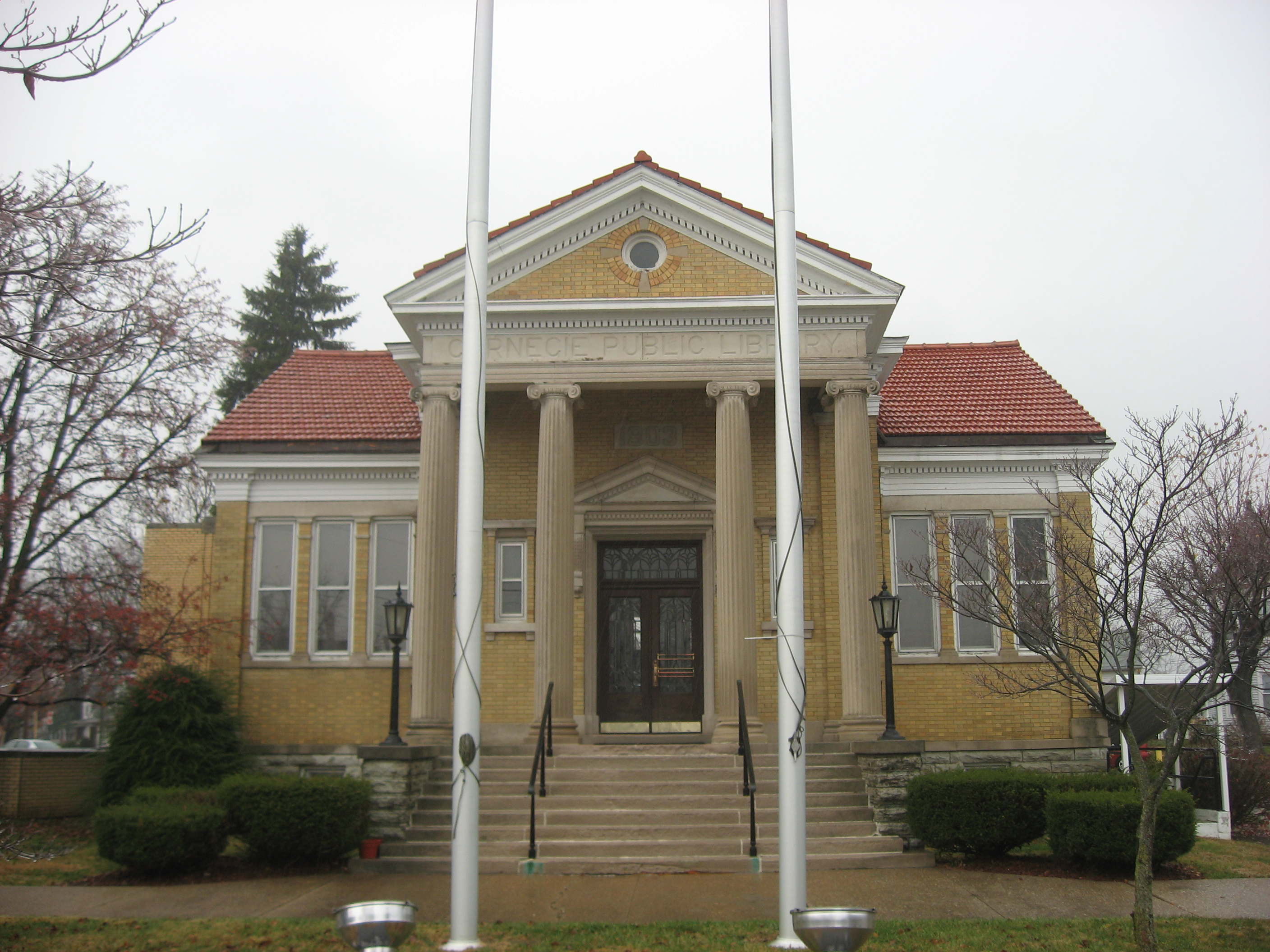
- Greensburg Carnegie Public Library, November 2010

- Location within Indiana Location within the United States
- Location: 114 N. Michigan Ave., Greensburg, Indiana
- Coordinates: 39°20′23″N 85°29′9″W
- Area: less than one acre
- Built: 1904
- Architect: Harris, William; Shopbell, Clifford, et al.
- Architectural style: Classical Revival
- NRHP reference No.: 95000701
- Added to NRHP: June 9, 1995

Greensburg Carnegie Public Library, also known as Greensburg City Hall, is a historic Carnegie library located at Greensburg, Indiana. It was built in 1904, and is a one-story, cruciform plan, tan brick building in the Classical Revival style. It is topped by a red terra cotta tiled gable roof and central drum and saucer dome. It features a projecting front portico supported by paired Ionic order columns. Its construction and furnishing was funded by a $15,000 grant provided by Andrew Carnegie.

It was added to the National Register of Historic Places in 1995.

The library operates today under the name Greensburg-Decatur County Public Library.

== See also ==
- List of Carnegie libraries in Indiana
