= Jerman School =

- U.S. National Register of Historic Places
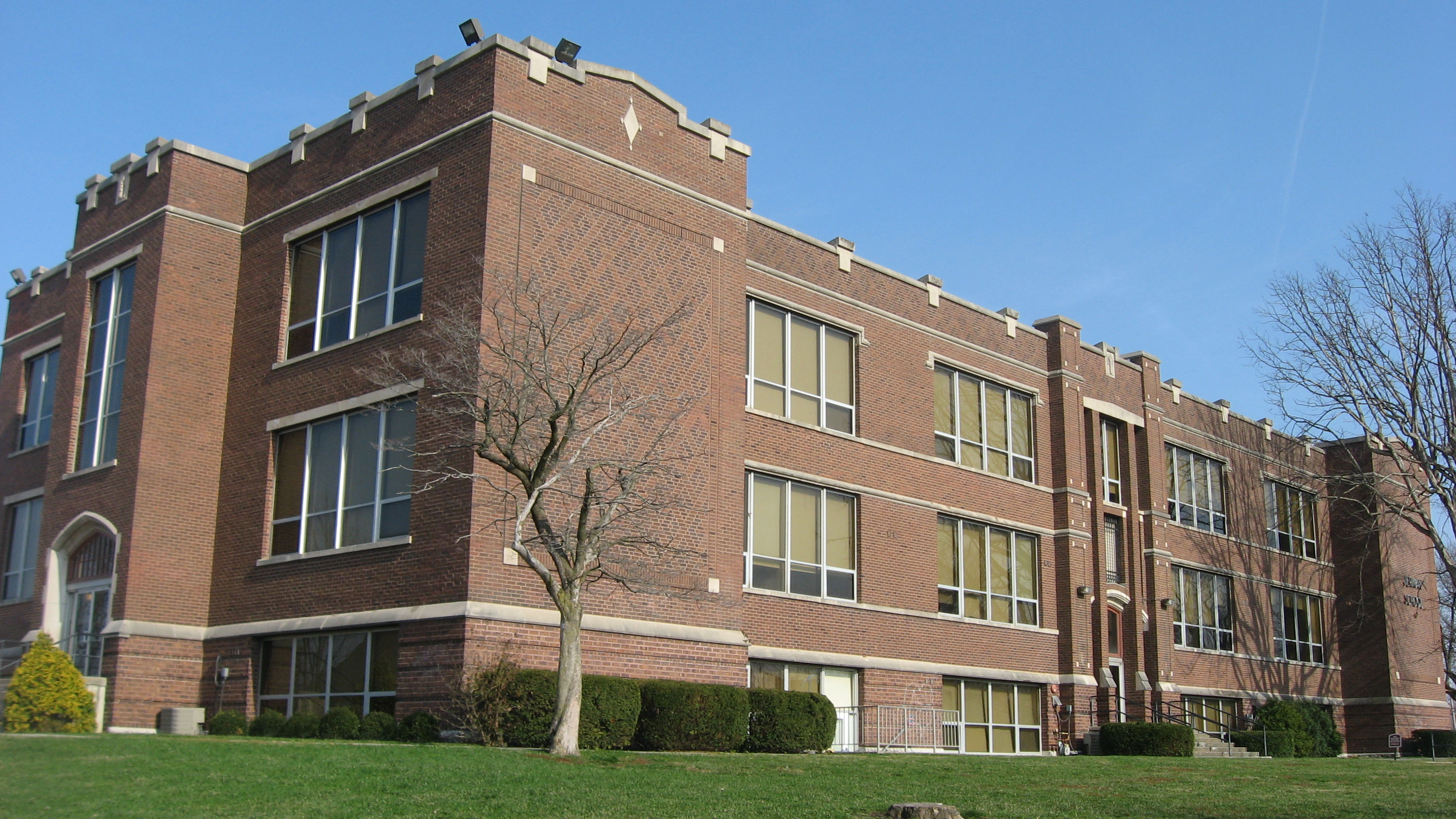
- Jerman School, December 2011

- Location within Indiana Location within the United States
- Location: 316 W. Walnut St., Greensburg, Indiana
- Coordinates: 39°20′32″N 85°29′13″W
- Area: 2 acres (0.81 ha)
- Built: 1914
- Architect: Foltz, Herbert; Pulse and Porter
- Architectural style: Tudor Revival
- MPS: Indiana's Public Common and High Schools MPS
- NRHP reference No.: 05001017
- Added to NRHP: September 15, 2005

Jerman School is a historic school building located at Greensburg, Indiana. It was built in 1914, and is a two-story, Tudor Revival style steel frame building on a raised foundation. It is sheathed in brick with limestone trim and consists of two projecting end bays, two classroom wings, and the central entrance bay. The building was renovated in 2003 to house senior apartments.

It was added to the National Register of Historic Places in 2005.
