= Soongsil University =

South Korean private university

- 숭실대학교
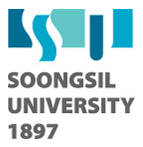
- Motto: 진리와 봉사; Truth and Service
- Type: Private
- Established: October 10, 1897; 128 years ago
- Founder: William M. Baird
- President: Lee Youn Jai (이윤재)
- Faculty: 1,239 (2011)
- Students: 16,406 (2011)
- Undergraduates: 13,647 (2011)
- Location: 369 Sangdo-ro, Dongjak-gu, Seoul, 06978, Korea, Dongjak-gu, Seoul, South Korea; 37°29′47″N 126°57′27″E
- Campus: Urban
- Mascot: White Horse
- Website: eng.ssu.ac.kr

- Soongsil University
- Hangul: 숭실대학교
- Hanja: 崇實大學校
- RR: Sungsil daehakgyo
- MR: Sungsil taehakkyo

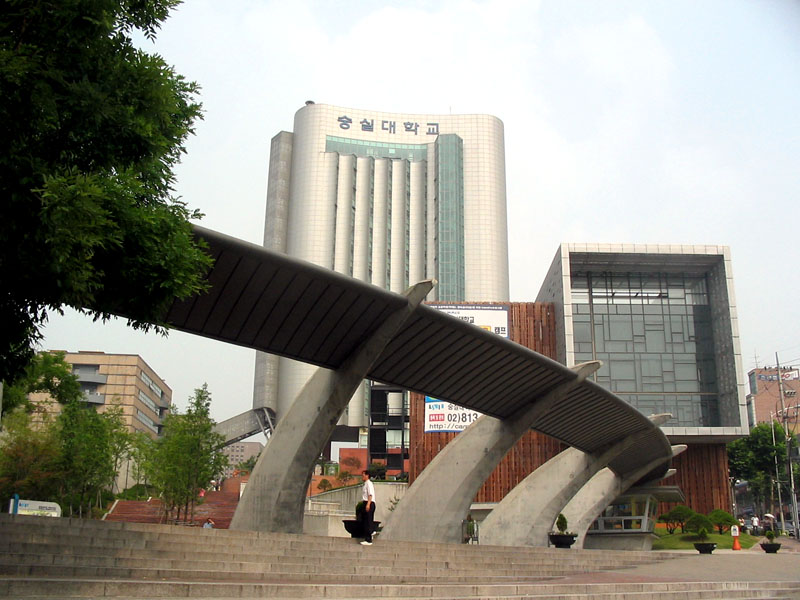
Main entrance of Soongsil University

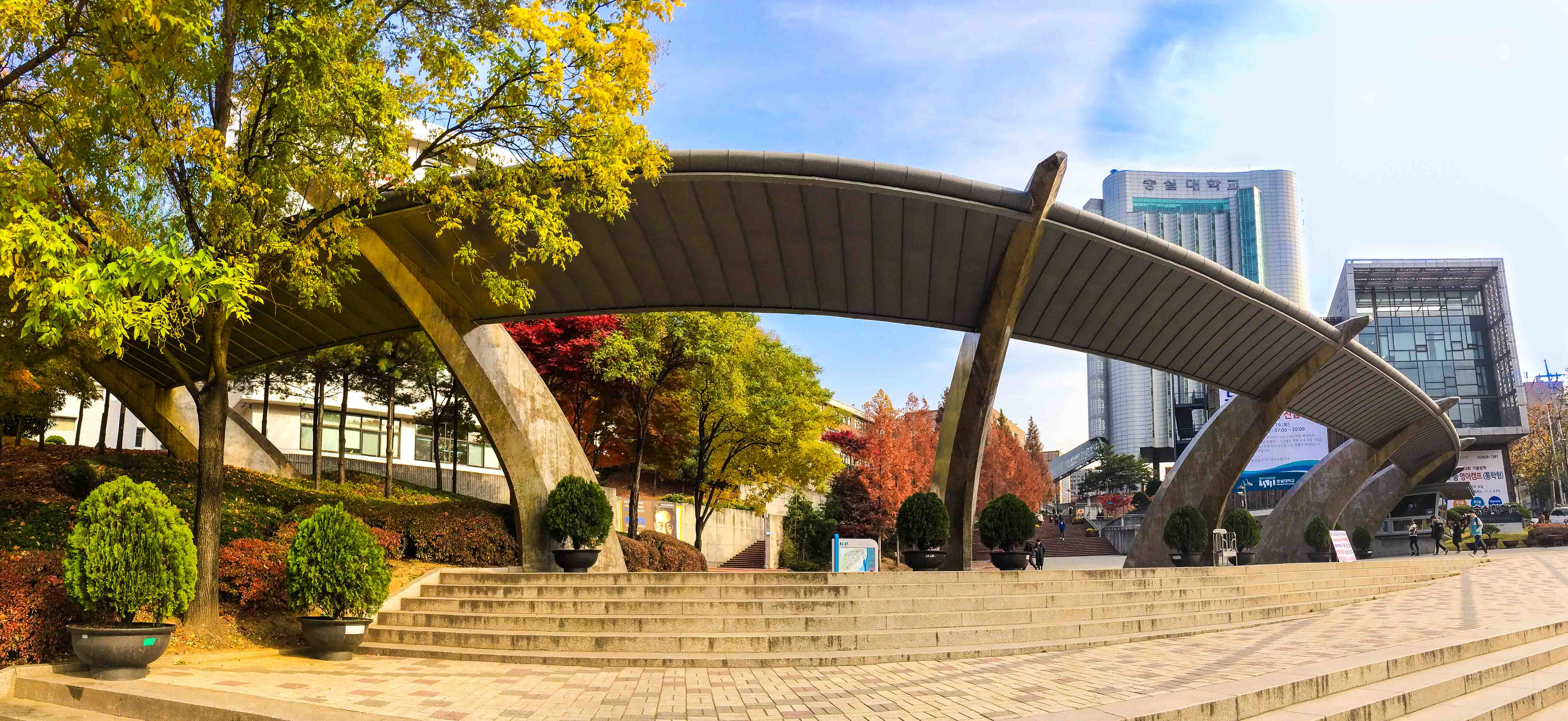
Soongsil University

Soongsil University (SSU) is the first modern university in Korea, dating its history back to 1897. It was founded under the Christian missionary William M. Baird. The campus is located in 369 Sangdo-ro, Dongjak-gu, Seoul, South Korea.

== History ==
Soongsil University was founded on October 10, 1897, in Pyongyang as a private school by William M. Baird, a missionary of the Presbyterian Church in the U.S.A. Board of Foreign Missions. In 1900 the school was developed into an official 4-year junior high school. In October 1901 the school was named Soongsil Hakdang (숭실학당, Soongsil Academy). The name Soongsil roughly means "Revering [God] (숭 soong) with Truth and Integrity (실 sil)".

In 1905 the academy established courses for students. In 1906 the academy again was permitted by Presbyterian and Methodist missionary bodies to establish a university department. The academy was called Union Christian College (합성숭실대학), which was later authorized as a university by the Korean government in 1907.

In 1925 the school was forcibly reduced to a 4-year technical school of humanities named 숭실전문학교 (崇實專門學校, pronounced Sūjitsu Senmon Gakkō in Japanese). On March 4, 1938, the school closed itself in order to protest against the enforcement of Shinto shrine worship.

In August 1945 Korea was liberated from Japanese colonialism, but the effort to restore the Soongsil College did not succeed until after the end of the Korean War. In April 1954 Soongsil College was reestablished in South Korea and in June 1957 it moved to the present-day Sangdo-dong Campus. In 1971 the college was merged with Daejun College (대전대학, 大田大學, not to be confused with present-day Daejeon University) into Soongjun College (숭전대학, 崇田大學). In December 1971 the college acquired a university status. In December 1982, the Daejeon Campus of Soongjun University was separated and renamed Hannam University. In November 1986, Soongjun University was renamed Soongsil University.

== Reputation ==
Soongsil is a private Christian University located in the heart of Seoul. It has a low acceptance rate and a high admission barrier. Students must reach within 5~7% in the Korean SAT to be accepted into the most competitive majors such as business and global commerce. Soongsil's IT, economics, business, and social welfare majors are considered especially strong. Its business school has the 10th biggest number of alumni with CPAs. Its computer science field, which Soongsil was a pioneer in Korea, is currently ranked second after Seoul National University. This gives the graduates a much better opportunity to land a job at the biggest IT giants such as Samsung, Google, and LG. The social welfare program at Soongsil University has a high reputation in Korea as a leading institution of social work education, retaining an unchanged high ranking in social work education evaluation for decades. According to a ranking made by JoongAng Ilbo, a Korean newspaper, it regularly ranks within the top 20 best universities.

== International students ==
Soongsil University is home to a large community of foreign students, partly due to its "Vision 2020" plan, which aims to substantially increase its foreign clientele.

The university is surrounded by bars, karaoke, and restaurants, the gathering place of the international community is located at the "C-Bomb" bar.

An alcoholic beverage, the Taximansi (contraction of "taxi" and "calamansi") created by a foreign student is now a symbol of Soongsil's student culture.

Foreign students are welcomed by "SISO" (Soongsil International Student Organization) a student organization aimed at helping foreigners throughout their stay. Soongsil students who volunteer as members of SISO are selected through a vigorous vetting process.

== Undergraduate schools ==
- College of Humanities
- College of Natural Sciences
- College of Law
- College of Social Sciences
- College of Economics & Global Commerce
- College of Business Administration
- College of Engineering
- College of Information Technology
- Baird University College (College of Core & Specialized Education)
- School of Finance

== Graduate schools ==
- General Graduate School
- Special Graduate Schools
  - Graduate School of Industry
  - Graduate School of Small Business
  - Graduate School of Information Sciences
  - Graduate School of Labor & Industrial Relations
  - Graduate School of Social Welfare
  - Graduate School of Education
  - Graduate School of Christian Studies
  - Graduate School of Global Business

== Notable people ==
- Park Won-sang, actor
- Park Joo-Ho, footballer
