= Decatur County Courthouse (Indiana) =

- U.S. National Register of Historic Places
- U.S. Historic district – Contributing property
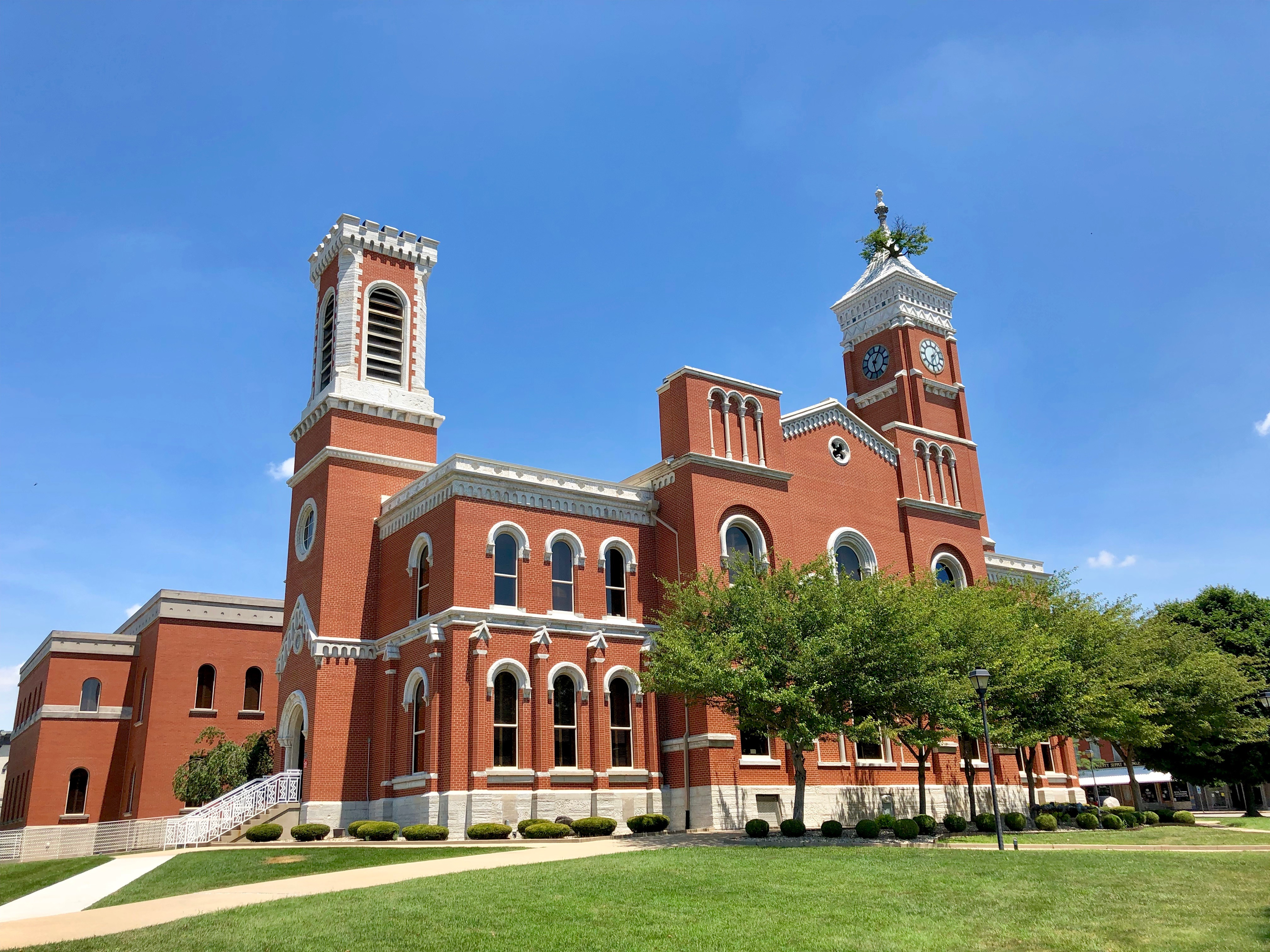
- Decatur County Courthouse, July 2019

- Location within Indiana Location within the United States
- Location: Courthouse Square, Greensburg, Indiana
- Coordinates: 39°20′13.58″N 85°29′0.43″W
- Area: 1 acre (0.40 ha)
- Built: 1854
- Architectural style: Romanesque
- Part of: Greensburg Downtown Historic District (ID95001113)
- NRHP reference No.: 73000014
- Added to NRHP: April 27, 1973

The Decatur County Courthouse is a historic courthouse building located at Greensburg, Indiana. It was listed on the National Register of Historic Places in 1973. It is best known for having a growing tree on its roof.

== History ==
The original courthouse was built in the 1820s when a log building was erected. On May 14, 1822, the first board of directors of the court met at the house of Thomas Hendricks, the owner of the double log building. A few years later, a small brick building, measuring two stories high and forty feet square, was built on the public square. Court was held in this structure until 1855. Building of the present structure commenced in 1850; it was completed in 1861, at a cost of $100,000. At the time, it was called the finest courthouse in the state.

In the early 1870s, it was noticed that a tree was growing on the roof. Soon four more trees were counted on the roof of the one hundred and ten foot steeple. This rapid growth of trees raised fears among county officials that permanent damage would be caused to the tower. In 1888, a steeplejack was hired to help workers scale the building and remove a few of the shrubs. Of the two trees left, one eventually reached a height of fifteen feet, with a base diameter of five inches. At some point, another tree began to grow on the southeast corner of the tower and reached a large height within a few years. As this tree was growing, another tree sprung up on the southwest corner.

The exact species of these trees has been a matter of debate. The Smithsonian Institution stated that the trees were large-tooth aspens, but a more recent study by Purdue University foresters has showed that the current tree is a mulberry.

In 1994, a renovation and expansion of the courthouse took place on the north end of the building. The floorspace of the building was more than doubled. At that time, the stucco that covered the building was removed and the original brick facing was revealed.
