= Greensburg, Indiana =

- City
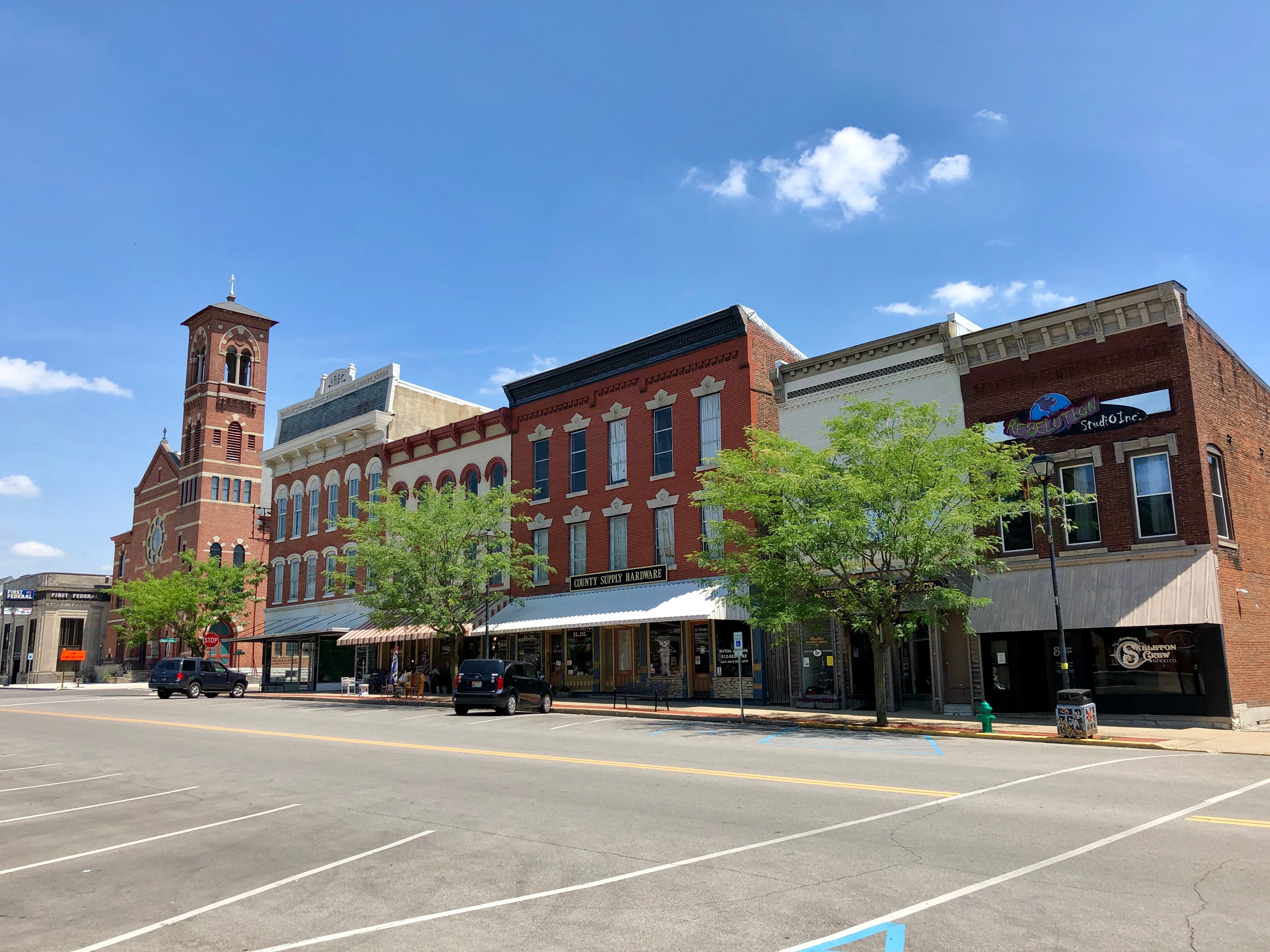
- Franklin Street in Downtown Greensburg

- Flag Logo
- Nickname: Tree City
- Location of Greensburg in Decatur County, Indiana.
- Coordinates: 39°21′10″N 85°30′12″W
- Country: United States
- State: Indiana
- County: Decatur
- Townships: Washington, Adams, Clay

Government
  - Mayor: Joshua Marsh (R)

Area
  - Total: 9.41 sq mi (24.37 km^{2})
  - Land: 9.36 sq mi (24.25 km^{2})
  - Water: 0.046 sq mi (0.12 km^{2})
- Elevation: 942 ft (287 m)

Population (2020)
  - Total: 12,312
  - Density: 1,315.1/sq mi (507.76/km^{2})
- Time zone: UTC-5 (EST)
  - Summer (DST): UTC-4 (EDT)
- ZIP code: 47240
- Area code: 812
- FIPS code: 18-29718
- GNIS feature ID: 2394992
- Website: www.cityofgreensburg.com

Greensburg is a city in and the county seat of Decatur County, Indiana, United States. The population was 12,312 at the time of the 2020 census.

== Etymology ==
Greensburg founder Thomas Hendricks Sr.'s wife named the city in honor of her native town, Greensburg, Pennsylvania. Its first post office opened in 1823 and spelled the city's name as Greensburgh until 1894.

== History ==
Greensburg was laid out in 1822 by Col Thomas Hendricks, a veteran of the War of 1812.

Michigan Road was completed in 1837, bringing more people to settle and visit the growing town. After the Cincinnati, Indianapolis, and St. Louis Railroad was completed in 1853, the town boomed. Agriculture, foundries, millineries, wholesale grocers, and other businesses took advantage of Greenburg's strategic rail position.

=== 20th century ===
At the beginning of the twentieth century, race relations in Greensburg worsened, leading to the expulsion of African Americans from the city after race riots against them in 1906 and 1907. According to James W. Loewen, Greensburg then was for decades a sundown town, a town that was purposely all-white.

The Indianapolis News reported that the incident on April 30, 1907, in which white residents drove non-whites from Greensburg, began as local outrage increased following a reported assault on a well-known Decatur County woman by John Green, a Black man. The News asserted that the incident was not a race war and was instead "the work of whiskey and every good citizen of Greensburg deplores it." The News put further blame on a "wide-open policy" that allowed "disreputable whites and depraved negroes" that had been in force for two years.

== Geography ==
According to the 2010 census, Greensburg has a total area of 9.315 square miles (24.13 km^{2}), of which 9.27 square miles (24.01 km^{2}) (or 99.52%) is land and 0.045 square miles (0.12 km^{2}) (or 0.48%) is water.

=== Climate ===
Greensburg is characterized by relatively high temperatures and evenly distributed precipitation throughout the year. Temperatures are high and can lead to warm, oppressive nights. Summers are usually somewhat wetter than winters, with much of the rainfall coming from convectional thunderstorm activity. The Köppen Climate Classification subtype for this climate is "Cfa" (Humid Subtropical Climate).

Climate data for Greensburg, Indiana, 1991–2020 normals, extremes 1985–2021
Month	Jan	Feb	Mar	Apr	May	Jun	Jul	Aug	Sep	Oct	Nov	Dec	Year
Record high °F (°C)	66 (19)	76 (24)	85 (29)	88 (31)	93 (34)	101 (38)	101 (38)	98 (37)	96 (36)	91 (33)	80 (27)	74 (23)	101 (38)
Mean maximum °F (°C)	59.5 (15.3)	64.1 (17.8)	73.2 (22.9)	81.1 (27.3)	86.9 (30.5)	91.2 (32.9)	92.4 (33.6)	92.0 (33.3)	89.5 (31.9)	82.9 (28.3)	71.0 (21.7)	62.5 (16.9)	93.8 (34.3)
Mean daily maximum °F (°C)	36.2 (2.3)	40.6 (4.8)	51.0 (10.6)	63.7 (17.6)	73.5 (23.1)	81.6 (27.6)	84.5 (29.2)	83.4 (28.6)	77.7 (25.4)	65.8 (18.8)	52.0 (11.1)	40.7 (4.8)	62.6 (17.0)
Daily mean °F (°C)	28.9 (−1.7)	32.4 (0.2)	41.9 (5.5)	53.7 (12.1)	64.1 (17.8)	72.4 (22.4)	75.4 (24.1)	73.9 (23.3)	67.5 (19.7)	55.7 (13.2)	43.4 (6.3)	33.6 (0.9)	53.6 (12.0)
Mean daily minimum °F (°C)	21.6 (−5.8)	24.1 (−4.4)	32.7 (0.4)	43.6 (6.4)	54.7 (12.6)	63.3 (17.4)	66.3 (19.1)	64.4 (18.0)	57.3 (14.1)	45.6 (7.6)	34.8 (1.6)	26.5 (−3.1)	44.6 (7.0)
Mean minimum °F (°C)	−0.2 (−17.9)	5.7 (−14.6)	15.0 (−9.4)	28.0 (−2.2)	37.8 (3.2)	49.9 (9.9)	54.7 (12.6)	53.4 (11.9)	42.4 (5.8)	30.1 (−1.1)	20.2 (−6.6)	8.1 (−13.3)	−3.0 (−19.4)
Record low °F (°C)	−21 (−29)	−12 (−24)	3 (−16)	20 (−7)	28 (−2)	39 (4)	49 (9)	42 (6)	33 (1)	24 (−4)	8 (−13)	−21 (−29)	−21 (−29)
Average precipitation inches (mm)	3.40 (86)	2.76 (70)	3.77 (96)	4.91 (125)	5.08 (129)	5.41 (137)	3.97 (101)	4.03 (102)	3.24 (82)	3.37 (86)	3.60 (91)	3.47 (88)	47.01 (1,193)
Average snowfall inches (cm)	4.4 (11)	3.8 (9.7)	1.7 (4.3)	0.0 (0.0)	0.0 (0.0)	0.0 (0.0)	0.0 (0.0)	0.0 (0.0)	0.0 (0.0)	0.1 (0.25)	0.2 (0.51)	3.1 (7.9)	13.3 (33.66)
Average precipitation days (≥ 0.01 in)	10.6	9.1	11.3	12.9	12.8	11.2	10.2	8.1	7.5	8.0	9.1	10.9	121.7
Average snowy days (≥ 0.1 in)	3.7	2.5	1.0	0.2	0.0	0.0	0.0	0.0	0.0	0.1	0.3	2.5	10.3
Source 1: NOAA
Source 2: National Weather Service

== Demographics ==
Historical population
Census	Pop.	Note	%±
1850	1,202		—
1860	1,283		6.7%
1880	3,198		—
1890	3,596		12.4%
1900	5,034		40.0%
1910	5,420		7.7%
1920	5,345		−1.4%
1930	5,702		6.7%
1940	6,065		6.4%
1950	6,619		9.1%
1960	7,492		13.2%
1970	8,620		15.1%
1980	9,254		7.4%
1990	9,286		0.3%
2000	10,260		10.5%
2010	11,492		12.0%
2020	12,312		7.1%
Source: US Census Bureau

=== 2020 census ===
As of the 2020 census, Greensburg had a population of 12,312. The median age was 39.0 years. 22.5% of residents were under the age of 18 and 18.5% of residents were 65 years of age or older. For every 100 females there were 93.0 males, and for every 100 females age 18 and over there were 91.4 males age 18 and over.

99.2% of residents lived in urban areas, while 0.8% lived in rural areas.

There were 5,063 households in Greensburg, of which 28.7% had children under the age of 18 living in them. Of all households, 39.6% were married-couple households, 21.0% were households with a male householder and no spouse or partner present, and 30.4% were households with a female householder and no spouse or partner present. About 33.4% of all households were made up of individuals and 14.1% had someone living alone who was 65 years of age or older.

There were 5,460 housing units, of which 7.3% were vacant. The homeowner vacancy rate was 2.0% and the rental vacancy rate was 6.6%.

Racial composition as of the 2020 census
Race	Number	Percent
White	11,356	92.2%
Black or African American	71	0.6%
American Indian and Alaska Native	22	0.2%
Asian	140	1.1%
Native Hawaiian and Other Pacific Islander	6	0.0%
Some other race	164	1.3%
Two or more races	553	4.5%
Hispanic or Latino (of any race)	418	3.4%

=== 2010 census ===
As of the census of 2010, there were 11,492 people, 4,661 households, and 2,927 families living in the city. The population density was 1,239.7 inhabitants per square mile (478.7/km^{2}). There were 5,185 housing units at an average density of 559.3 per square mile (215.9/km^{2}). The racial makeup of the city was 96.1% White, 0.4% African American, 0.2% Native American, 1.3% Asian, 0.9% from other races, and 0.9% from two or more races. Hispanic or Latino of any race were 2.4% of the population.

There were 4,661 households, of which 32.5% had children under the age of 18 living with them, 44.2% were married couples living together, 13.8% had a female householder with no husband present, 4.8% had a male householder with no wife present, and 37.2% were non-families. 31.5% of all households were made up of individuals, and 13.2% had someone living alone who was 65 years of age or older. The average household size was 2.38 and the average family size was 2.98.

The median age in the city was 37 years. 25% of residents were under the age of 18; 8.6% were between the ages of 18 and 24; 26.4% were from 25 to 44; 24.5% were from 45 to 64; and 15.6% were 65 years of age or older. The gender makeup of the city was 47.9% male and 52.1% female.

=== 2000 census ===
As of the census of 2000, there were 10,260 people, 4,178 households, and 2,778 families living in the city. The population density was 2,140.4 inhabitants per square mile (826.4/km^{2}). There were 4,420 housing units at an average density of 922.1 per square mile (356.0/km^{2}). The racial makeup of the city was 97.57% White, 0.08% African American, 0.16% Native American, 1.39% Asian, 0.01% Pacific Islander, 0.10% from other races, and 0.69% from two or more races. Hispanic or Latino of any race were 0.62% of the population.

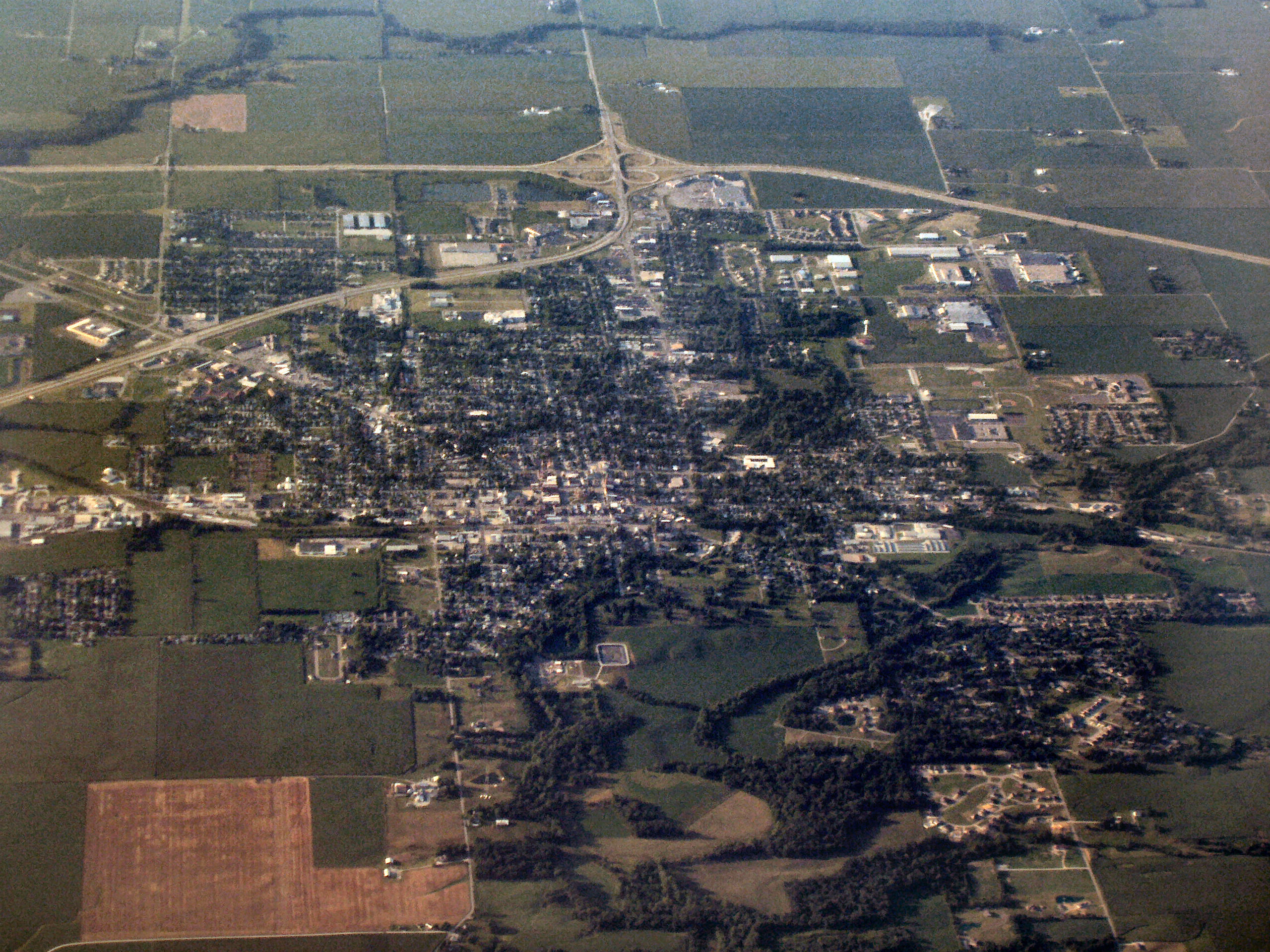
Greensburg from the air, looking north.

There were 4,178 households, out of which 31.6% had children under the age of 18 living with them, 50.7% were married couples living together, 12.1% had a female householder with no husband present, and 33.5% were non-families. 28.9% of all households were made up of individuals, and 12.3% had someone living alone who was 65 years of age or older. The average household size was 2.39, and the average family size was 2.92.

In the city, the population was spread out, with 24.6% under the age of 18, 10.0% from 18 to 24, 28.9% from 25 to 44, 20.8% from 45 to 64, and 15.6% who were 65 years of age or older. The median age was 36 years. For every 100 females, there were 91.2 males. For every 100 females age 18 and over, there were 86.9 males.

The median income for a household in the city was $38,029, and the median income for a family was $45,439. Males had a median income of $31,662 versus $24,605 for females. The per capita income for the city was $18,829. About 8.0% of families and 11.4% of the population were below the poverty line, including 15.2% of those under age 18 and 12.1% of those age 65 or over.

== Economy ==
Honda Motor Company operates an automobile manufacturing plant (Honda Manufacturing of Indiana, LLC) along Interstate 74 in Greensburg. This facility, also called Indiana Auto Plant or IAP, is the largest employer in the city as of 2026. Honda purchased 1,700 acres (6.9 km^{2}) at the northwest edge of Greensburg in 2006. Mass production of the Honda Civic (eighth generation) sedan commenced at IAP on October 9, 2008. A second shift was added in fall 2011. Production capacity was increased by 25% to accommodate the start of production of the Civic hybrid in early 2013. In 2018, Honda invested US$32.5 million to expand its plant with a new 19,200 square-foot building for new in-house subassembly of vehicles' front end module, including radiator and cooling fan.

As of 2026, IAP employs over 2,600 associates and produces the eleventh-generation Honda Civic hatchback and sixth-generation Honda CR-V. Previously, the 2012 Acura ILX hybrid assembled at IAP became the first hybrid model built by Honda in North America. Honda has been exporting IAP assembled Civics to Mexico, Latin America, the Caribbean, and the U.S. territories of Puerto Rico, Guam and Saipan since 2009.

Delta Faucet Company has operated a manufacturing facility in the city since 1958. In addition to faucet components, Delta's Greensburg plant also produces bath tubs and shower fixtures.

== Culture ==
=== Historical society ===
The Historical Society of Decatur County established a museum in 1976 in a historic former residence. The museum underwent an expansion and renovation in 2006, providing better facilities for storage, record keeping, and exhibits. Visits to the Historical Society Museum and a Pioneer Day event provide students an interactive learning experience on the life of the area's first settlers. Another school enrichment project allows students to research historic buildings, focusing on the age, architecture, use and other information that would help place the structure within the community's story. The results are then condensed onto bronze plaques placed on the exterior of the buildings. The incentive package included $5,000 to offset moving expenses, a year's membership to the local co-working space and YMCA, gift cards to the seasonal farmers market, tickets throughout the year to productions at the local playhouse, home-cooked meals and a program called "Grandparents on Demand", which offered babysitting hours and a stand in on Grandparents Day at school.

=== Landmarks ===
The Bromwell Wire Works, Decatur County Courthouse, Greensburg Carnegie Public Library, Greensburg Downtown Historic District, Bright B. Harris House, Jerman School, and Knights of Pythias Building and Theatre are listed on the National Register of Historic Places.

=== Tree on the Courthouse Tower ===
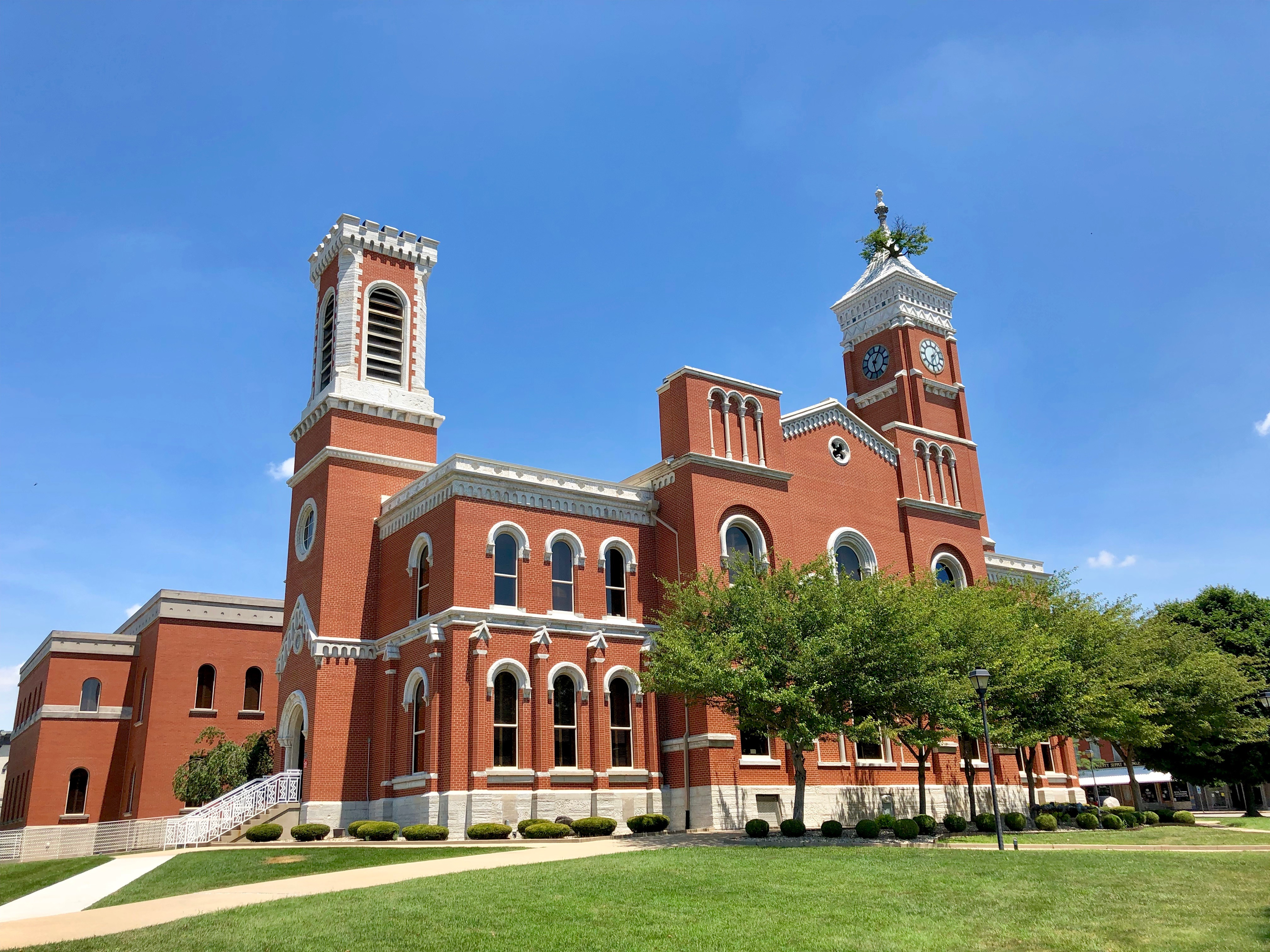
Tree on the Courthouse Tower in Greensburg, Indiana

The Decatur County Courthouse in Greensburg is known for a tree which grows from the top of the Courthouse Tower, giving Greensburg its nickname, "Tree City".

There have been one or more trees growing continually since the first tree was noticed in the early 1870s. Later, other small trees appeared on the clock tower.

County officials were initially concerned that the trees would cause damage to the roof, and a steeplejack was hired in the 1880s to remove some of them. Two trees were left, with one ultimately growing to a height of nearly 15 feet (4.6 m). By the time it died, another tree had appeared.

Today, there are two trees on the tower. During a recent tree trimming a piece of the tree was examined by several Purdue University foresters and they positively identified the tree as a mulberry tree.

== Transportation ==
Greensburg is located adjacent to Interstate 74 halfway between Indianapolis and Cincinnati. U.S. Route 421 links Greensburg with Indianapolis to the north and Lexington, Kentucky, to the south. State Road 3 connects Greensburg with Muncie and Fort Wayne to the north and the Indiana suburbs of Louisville, Kentucky, to the south. State Road 46 links the community with Columbus, Bloomington, and Terre Haute to the west and Batesville to the east. Recently a construction project, which has made going east on Interstate 74 from the ramp west of town possible, has been completed.

Greensburg is a likely train stop on the proposed high-speed rail line between Indianapolis and Cincinnati. This line is part of the Midwest Regional Rail Initiative, which is the master plan for a high-speed rail network throughout the midwestern United States.

The Greensburg Municipal Airport consists of a single runway measuring 3,343 ft (1,019 m). by 40 ft (12 m). There are tentative plans to either expand the current runway or build a new airport elsewhere in Decatur County.

Indianapolis International Airport is located 59 miles (95 km) from Greensburg, and Cincinnati/Northern Kentucky International Airport is located 66 miles (106 km) away.

== Education ==
Almost all of the city territory is in the Greensburg Community Schools, while small pieces extend into Decatur County Community Schools.

== Media ==
Greensburg has one newspaper, the Greensburg Daily News, which is published Mondays through Saturdays. The paper is owned by CNHI.

Greensburg is also home to 1330 AM 104.3 FM WTRE, a locally owned and operated 500-watt AM/FM radio station that plays country music, local news, and local sports from area high schools.

== Notable people ==
- Annie Laurie Adams Baird (1864–1916), Author and American missionary in Korea
- William Cumback (1829–1905), attorney, Civil War Army paymaster, U.S. representative, and 16th lieutenant governor of Indiana
- Carl G. Fisher (1874–1939), entrepreneur involved with starting Indianapolis Motor Speedway and developing Miami Beach
- James Bradford Foley (1807–1886), politician elected to Thirty-fifth Congress
- John Goodnow (1858–1907), United States consul general in Shanghai from 1897 to 1905
- Marc Griffin (born in 1956), lawyer, world's youngest judge
- Thomas Hendricks Sr. (1773–1835), veteran of War of 1812, founded Greensburg in 1821, which was named by his wife in 1822; served in Indiana House of Representatives and Indiana State Senate
- Ezekiel J. Ingersoll (1838–1925), Illinois state representative and businessman
- Oliver Kessing (1890–1963), the third and last commissioner of the All-America Football Conference
- Alfred Knapp (1862–1904), serial killer
- Rose McConnell Long (1892–1970), United States senator and the wife of Huey Long; third woman to ever serve in the U.S. Senate
- Bryant McIntosh (born November 20, 1994), college basketball player for Northwestern Wildcats men's basketball team
- Alex Meyer (born in 1990), former Major League Baseball player for Los Angeles Angels
- Dave Robbins, jazz trombonist, composer, and educator
- Wilbur Shaw (1902–1954), three-time Indianapolis 500 winner and president of Indianapolis Motor Speedway
- Roy Henry Thorpe (1874–1951), politician elected to 67th United States Congress in 1922
- Gilbert Van Camp (1814–1900), businessman who founded Van Camp canning company
- John T. Wilder (1830–1917), Civil War Union General, known for commanding Lightning Brigade and for success at Battle of Chickamauga
- Aldred Scott Warthin (1866–1931), pathologist known as the "father of cancer genetics"
- Samantha Toney (born October 18, 1994), Miss Indiana USA in 2022

== See also ==
- List of sundown towns in the United States
