= Greensburg Municipal Airport =

Airport in Indiana, United States

- IATA: none; ICAO: none; FAA LID: I34

Summary
- Airport type: Public
- Owner: Greensburg-Decatur County Board of Aviation Commissioners
- Serves: Greensburg, Indiana
- Elevation AMSL: 912 ft (278 m)
- Coordinates: 39°19′37″N 085°31′21″W
- Website: www.CityOfGreensburg.com/...

Map
- Location of airport in Indiana/United States I34 (the United States)

Runways
Direction	Length		Surface
Direction	ft	m	Surface
1/19	5,406	1,648	Asphalt

Statistics
- Aircraft operations (2017): 2,701
- Based aircraft (2020): 34
- Sources: FAA and City of Greensburg

Greensburg Municipal Airport (FAA LID: I34) is a public use airport located two nautical miles (4 km) southwest of the central business district of Greensburg, a city in Decatur County, Indiana, United States. Owned by the Greensburg-Decatur County Board of Aviation Commissioners, it was formerly known as Greensburg-Decatur County Airport. It is included in the National Plan of Integrated Airport Systems for 2017–2021, which categorized it as a general aviation facility.

== Facilities and aircraft ==
Greensburg Municipal Airport covers an area of 30 acres (12 ha) at an elevation of 908.9 feet (277 m) above mean sea level. It has one runway designated 1/19 with an asphalt surface measuring 5,406 by 100 feet (1,648 x 30 m).

For the 12-month period ending December 31, 2017, the airport had 2,701 aircraft operations, an average of 7 per day: 99% general aviation and 1% air taxi. In November 2020, there were 34 aircraft based at this airport: all 34 single-engine.

== See also ==
- List of airports in Indiana
