= Greensburg Downtown Historic District (Greensburg, Indiana) =

Historic district in Indiana, United States

- U.S. National Register of Historic Places
- U.S. Historic district
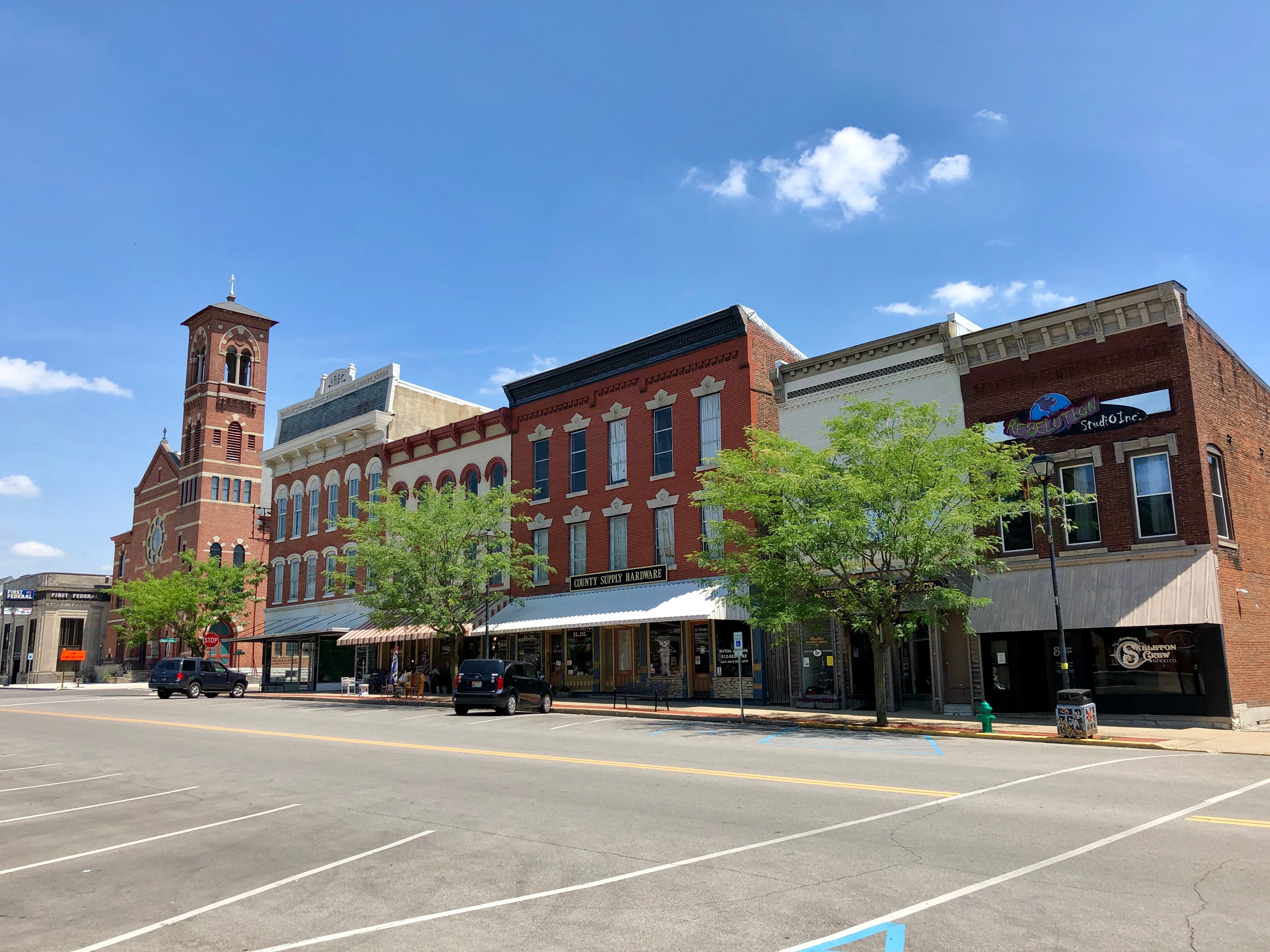
- Contributing Structures on Franklin Street

- Location within Indiana Location within the United States
- Location: Roughly, area surrounding the courthouse square, Greensburg, Indiana
- Coordinates: 39°20′15″N 85°29′1″W
- Area: 15 acres (6.1 ha)
- Architect: May, Edwin G.
- Architectural style: Italianate, Queen Anne, Classical Revival
- NRHP reference No.: 95001113
- Added to NRHP: September 14, 1995

The Greensburg Downtown Historic District is a national historic district located at Greensburg, Indiana. It encompasses 67 contributing buildings and 3 contributing objects in the central business district of Greensburg. The district developed between about 1854 and 1945, and includes notable examples of Italianate, Queen Anne, and Classical Revival style architecture. Located in the district are the separately listed Decatur County Courthouse and Knights of Pythias Building and Theatre. Other notable buildings include the Palmer Building (c. 1860), YMCA (1915), City Hall (1874), U.S. Post Office, George E. Erdmann Building (1908), .

It was listed on the National Register of Historic Places in 1995.
