= Thomas Hendricks Sr. =

American politician (1773–1835)

Thomas Hendricks (1773–1835) was born in Westmoreland County, Pennsylvania on January 28, 1773. He was the brother of William Hendricks and father of Abram Hendricks, the uncle of William Hendricks Jr., future U.S. Vice President Thomas A. Hendricks, and Abram W. Hendricks. Hendricks founded Greensburg, Indiana in 1821, which was named by his wife, Elizabeth, in 1822.

Hendricks served as a member of Indiana House of Representatives from 1823 until 1825 and again from 1827 until 1831. He was also member of Indiana State Senate from 1831 until 1834. He died in Greensburg, Indiana March 31, 1835.
