= Seward =

Seward is the name of:

== People ==
=== Surname ===
- Seward (surname)

=== Middle name ===
- William Seward Burroughs I (1857–1898), inventor of adding machine
- William S. Burroughs (1914–1997), American novelist, poet, essayist and spoken word performer
- John Seward Johnson II (1930–2020), American sculptor
- William S. Burroughs, Jr. (1947–1981), author and son of the above

=== First name ===
- Seward Collins (1899–1952), publisher of The American Review, prominent pre–World War II proponent of fascism
- Seward Smith, American politician, associate justice of the Dakota Territory Supreme Court

== Places ==
=== United States ===
==== Counties ====
- Seward County, Kansas
- Seward County, Nebraska

==== Cities and towns ====
- Seward, Alaska
- Seward, Illinois
- Seward Township, Kendall County, Illinois
- Seward Township, Winnebago County, Illinois
- Seward, Kansas
- Seward Township, Minnesota
- Seward, Nebraska
- Seward, New York
- Seward, North Carolina
- Seward, Pennsylvania

==== Others ====
- Seward Highway, Alaska
- Seward Peninsula, Alaska
- Seward, Minneapolis, a neighborhood in Minneapolis, Minnesota
- Seward Lake, New York
- Seward Mountain (New York)
- Seward Park (disambiguation)
- Seward High School (disambiguation)
- Seward Plantation, a Southern plantation in Independence, Texas

=== World ===
- Seward Mountains (disambiguation), various places
- Sewards End, a village and civil parish in the Uttlesford district of Essex, England

== Other uses ==
- Seward Power Plant, a coal-fired power plant in Pennsylvania
- Seward Trunk Co., an American luggage company

== See also ==
- Siward (disambiguation)
