= 2011 Reading tornado =

EF3 tornado in Kansas, USA

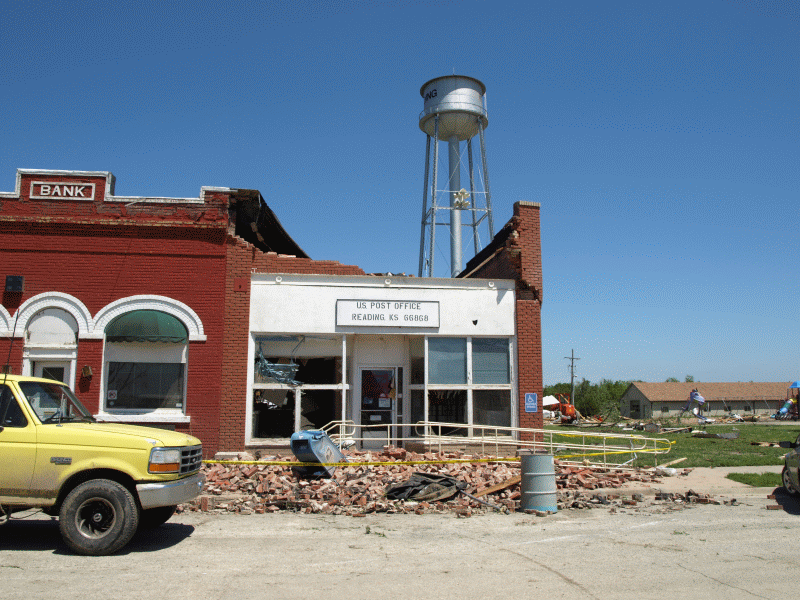
- Clockwise: A view of the deadly EF3 tornado from a distance, damage to the post office in Reading; a Next-Generation Radar loop of the supercell and tornado.

Meteorological history
- Formed: May 21, 2011, 9:10 PM CDT (UTC−05:00)
- Dissipated: May 21, 2011, 9:30 PM CDT (UTC−05:00)
- Duration: 20 minutes

EF3 tornado
- on the Enhanced Fujita scale
- Max width: 700 yards (0.40 mi; 0.64 km)
- Path length: 10.11 miles (16.27 km)
- Highest winds: 140 mph (230 km/h)

Overall effects
- Fatalities: 1
- Injuries: 5
- Damage: >$2.28 million (Note: All damage totals are in 2011 USD unless otherwise stated.)
- Areas affected: Lyon and Osage Counties, Kansas, United States; primarily the city of Reading
- Part of the tornado outbreak sequence of May 21–26, 2011 and tornadoes of 2011

Just after dusk on Saturday, May 21, 2011, a powerful tornado struck the small city of Reading, Kansas, damaging or destroying tens to hundreds of homes, businesses and facilities. The tornado occurred during a multi-day tornado outbreak sequence across the central United States, from May 21–26, 2011, and a day before the killer EF5 tornado that caused devastating damage in Joplin, Missouri. This deadly EF3 tornado occurred as part of a small family of tornadoes and localized severe weather event, consisting of eight tornadoes across northeastern Kansas, particularly within Lyon and Osage Counties. Most of these tornadoes were weak and insignificant events, except for one EF1 tornado that struck Quenemo.

The Reading, Kansas tornado, as it is frequently known by the National Weather Service in Topeka and the press, was on the ground for 10.11 miles (16.27 km) and was up to 700 yards (0.40 mi; 0.64 km) wide. The tornado, classified as an EF3 on the Enhanced Fujita scale, had estimated winds of 140 mph (230 km/h). Within Reading, the tornado injured five people and killed one, making it the deadliest tornado in Kansas in 2011 until an EF2 tornado killed two people near Seward, located in Stafford County, a few days later on May 24.

== Meteorological synopsis ==
=== Episode narrative ===
Storm Prediction Center outlooks on May 21, 2011

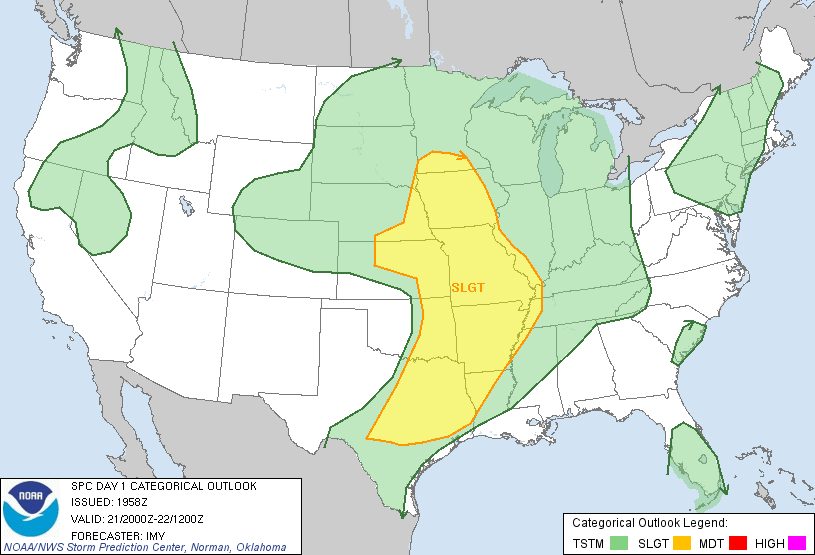
Day 1 categorical outlooks.

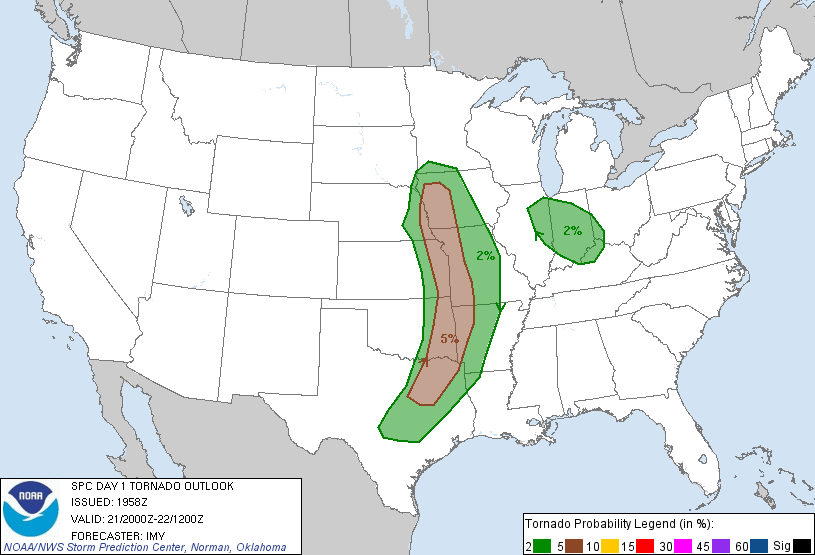
Day 1 tornado outlooks.

At 6:00 AM CDT (11:00 UTC) on May 20, 2011, the Storm Prediction Center outlined a Day 2 slight risk for severe weather driven by a 15% probability of severe weather within 25 miles (40 km) of a point for portions of eastern Kansas and western Missouri, as low-level moisture levels were ample enough to support a severe weather threat when coupled with the forecasted atmospheric troughing and the high chance of sufficient daytime heating. Additional slight risk areas were outlined for an area stretching from Michigan to Mississippi and for portions of Louisiana and Arkansas, alongside Texas. By 12:30 PM CDT (17:30 UTC), all three slight risks were merged into one large area, which stretched from northern Iowa to southeastern Arkansas and northern Mississippi.

The following day at 6:00 AM CDT (11:00 UTC), a 5% probability for tornadoes within 25 miles (40 km) of a point was outlined for much of eastern Kansas and western Missouri, and stretched to northeastern Texas. This probability was outlined due to sufficient instability, steep mid-level lapse rates, sufficient shear, and an expectation for thunderstorms to form along a dry line. The 5% probability was maintained throughout the day, but was shifted northeastward for portions of Kansas. By 8:00 PM CDT (01:00 UTC), the 5% probability stretched from northwestern Iowa to northeastern Texas, and encompassed far eastern Kansas and portions of western Missouri. Two areas with a 30% probability of large hail within 25 miles (40 km) of a point accompanied the tornado risk, with this being the primary hazard of the evening. The first area was mostly in Iowa and Missouri, and another covered portions of eastern Texas. Additionally, a 30% probability of damaging winds within 25 miles (40 km) of a point was outlined for Iowa and Missouri.

=== Event narrative ===
In the hours before the EF3 tornado, a strong cap was in place over eastern Kansas, delaying storm initiation until later in the evening. Areas north of Interstate 70 were the most likely to receive thunderstorms. Steep mid-level lapse rates, MLCAPE values reaching 2000–2500 J/KG, and deep layer shear reaching 30–35 kn (35–40 mph; 56–65 km/h) supported supercellular development, with a probability that storms eventually merge into a mesoscale convective system, and pose a threat for high winds. Later that night, a supercell developed and spawned several tornadoes in eastern Kansas, with the EF3 that struck the town of Reading touching down at 9:10 PM CDT (02:10 UTC).

== Storm summary ==
=== Reading tornado timeline ===
Before the formation of the EF3 Reading tornado, the National Weather Service in Topeka, Kansas issued a tornado warning at 8:52 PM CDT (01:52 UTC) for portions of Lyon County. Another tornado warning was then issued 16 minutes later for Osage County, at 9:08 PM CDT (02:08 UTC).

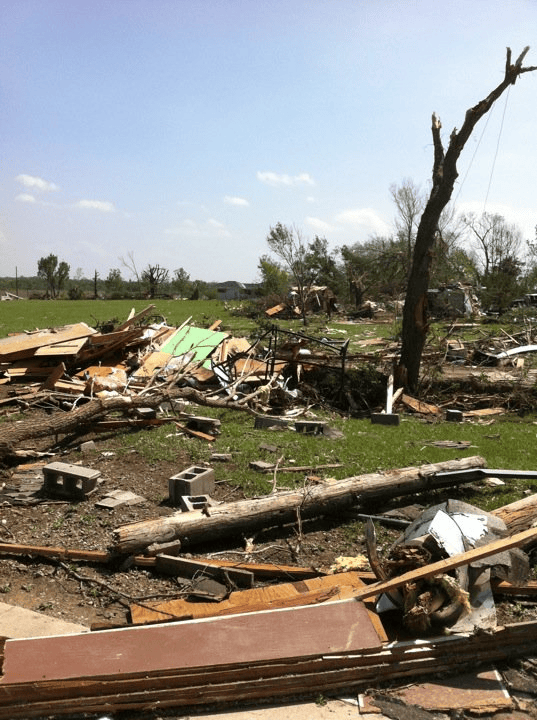
A destroyed house in western Reading.

Approximately two minutes later after the second warning, a tornado touched down in eastern Lyon County, south of Road 240 at 9:10 PM CDT (02:10 UTC). After traveling for 3 miles (4.8 km) on an east-northeasterly path, the tornado intensified and impacted the city of Reading, after crossing over Road Y. Entering through the west side of town, the intense tornado began to cause instances of EF3 damage. In Reading, the tornado with winds approaching 140 miles per hour (230 kilometres per hour), damaged or destroyed many structures within the city. One single-story house was completely destroyed, and swept off its foundation. In other parts of the city, several other, two-story homes sustained major damage, as the tornado damaged or removed the second stories of some of them. A well-anchored mobile home was launched 50 yards (46 m) into a nearby tree and obliterated, killing a 53-year old man who was inside at the time. Throughout Reading, the tornado also rolled numerous vehicles, and one large chemical tank was thrown 100 yards (91 m) away from its origin point. Five people were injured in the area.

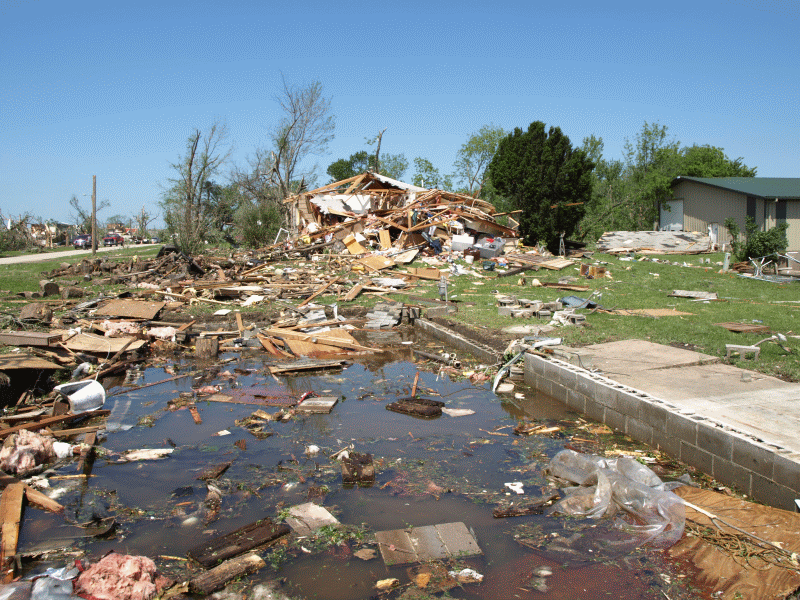
A mobile home wiped off the foundation and scattered into a tree in Reading.

At 9:20 PM CDT (02:20 UTC) the tornado exited out of the city, and Lyon County proper. Now in Osage County, the tornado continued to travel along a path 6.98 miles (11.23 km) long. Around 3 minutes after entering the county, a new tornado warning was issued at 9:23 PM CDT (02:23 UTC). Minutes earlier at the same time the Reading tornado entered Osage County, a nearby EF0 satellite tornado developed on the southeastern flank of the EF3 parent tornado. This secondary tornado stayed on the ground for 4 minutes, before lifting at 9:24 PM CDT (02:24 UTC). Meanwhile, the tornado continued to track through the rural areas northwest of Melvern Lake. EF1 damage was observed at one farmstead in the area. Additional but insignificant, and sporadic tree damage occurred as the tornado weakened at this point. After traveling for 20 minutes, the tornado which impacted Reading earlier, dissipated at 9:30 PM CDT (02:30 UTC). The tornado ended 2.25 miles (3.62 km) east of Barclay, or south of Osage City.

=== Other tornadoes in Kansas ===
Several tornadoes occurred across parts of the Great Plains and Midwest on May 21, 2011.
Below is a list that exclusively highlights tornadoes that have occurred in Kansas on that day.

List of confirmed tornadoes – Saturday, May 21, 2011 (Note: All dates are based on the local time zone where the tornado touched down; however, all times are in Coordinated Universal Time for consistency.)
EF#	Location	County / Parish	State	Start Coord.	Time (UTC)	Path length	Max width	Damage
EF0	W of Pauline	Shawnee	KS	38.9546°N 95.7609°W	23:16–23:20	1.2 mi (1.9 km)	150 yd (140 m)	Unknown
EF0	The tornado caused minor damage along its path.							
EF0	Southeastern Topeka	Shawnee	KS	39.0115°N 95.6518°W	23:35–23:39	2.03 mi (3.27 km)	50 yd (46 m)	Unknown
EF0	Minor tree and structural damage was observed near Lake Shawnee along a narrow path accompanied by rear flank downdraft damage.							
EF0	W of Iowa Point	Doniphan	KS	39.9200°N 95.2700°W	23:57–23:59	0.27 mi (0.43 km)	50 yd (46 m)	$0
EF0	Minor tree damage was observed.							
EF0	S of Ozawkie	Jefferson	KS	39.1650°N 95.4520°W	00:20–00:21	1.94 mi (3.12 km)	50 yd (46 m)	Unknown
EF0	A waterspout over Perry Lake moved ashore, producing tree damage. One tree fell on a mobile home, briefly trapping the resident.							
EF1	NE of Emporia	Lyon	KS	38.4453°N 96.1611°W	01:50–01:54	6.05 mi (9.74 km)	150 yd (140 m)	Unknown
EF1	Some farm outbuildings were heavily damaged, a chimney collapsed onto a home, and several large trees were snapped.							
EF0	S of Barclay	Osage	KS	38.5432°N 95.8968°W	02:20–02:24	1.39 mi (2.24 km)	50 yd (46 m)	Unknown
EF0	This was a satellite tornado to the Reading tornado. Several trees were blown down and a cow pen was pushed to the northeast.							
EF0	ESE of Worden	Douglas	KS	38.7525°N 95.2659°W	03:41	0.05 mi (80 m)	25 yd (23 m)	$0
EF0	A very brief tornado with no damage.							
EF1	Quenemo	Osage, Franklin	KS	38.5768°N 95.5333°W	03:43–03:52	2.89 mi (4.65 km)	100 yd (91 m)	Unknown
EF1	Several houses were damaged, two garages were destroyed, and several trees were downed.							

== Aftermath ==
=== Initial assessments ===
In the wake of the tornado, National Weather Service damage surveyors from the Topeka, Kansas office, descended upon areas affected by the tornado on May 22, 2011. Two assessment teams were out that day across Lyon, Osage and Franklin Counties. By 4:31 PM CDT (21:31 UTC) that day, the first survey results were revealed through a public information statement. Multiple tornadoes were discovered to have occurred on May 21, most of them weak EF0 and EF1 tornadoes. The highest rated tornado from the preliminary assessments, was the tornado that struck Reading the night prior. The tornado, classified as an EF3 on the Enhanced Fujita scale, (Note: The tornado is considered a low-end EF3 on its respective scale.) had estimated peak winds of 140 mph (230 km/h). It stayed on the ground along a 10.3 mi (16.6 km) path, and was 700 yd (0.40 mi; 640 m) wide at its largest.

=== Regional impact ===
==== Inflicted damage ====
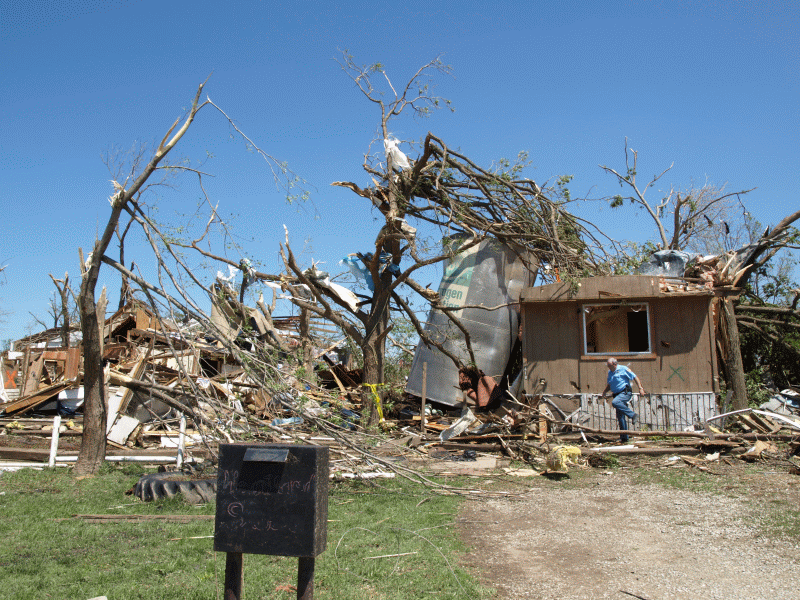
A destroyed residence, one of many left in such state after the tornado.

Mainly in Reading, the tornado damaged some 200 homes in the town of 250 residents. Around 20 houses were considered destroyed. The town's only restaurant, the fire department and post office were affected as well during the event. Some businesses, like a grain and lumber company, suffered extensive damage. Aside from tornadoes, storms also brought hailstones the size of baseballs. Outside of the main area, several barns and farmhouses were reportedly affected and demolished by the tornado. By Sunday on May 22, 2011, the surrounding regions around Reading became a disaster area, with debris of homes and other buildings strewn into fields.

==== Casualty figures ====
When it came to the affected victims of the event, initial findings concluded four injuries, and one death. Lee Tafanelli, the adjutant general and director of the Kansas Division of Emergency Management, confirmed the identity of the lone fatality belonging to 53-year old Don Chesmore. Chesmore rode out the storm inside a mobile trailer home, which was struck by the tornado. He was brought to a hospital in Emporia, where he was pronounced dead. Later analyses of the casualties upped the injuries to a total of five.

=== Recovery process ===
==== Volunteers and USDA assistance ====
In the days following the deadly EF3 tornado, Reading underwent a steady process to its recovery, with residents and volunteers cleaning up the debris and paying their respects to the death of Don Chesmore. On May 23, two days after the tornado, then Kansas state governor Sam Brownback and his staff visited the community to tour the damage. Throughout much of the spring of 2011, parts of the United States were affected by weather-related disasters, such as in the case of the EF5 tornado that caused catastrophic destruction in Joplin, Missouri the day after the Reading, Kansas tornado. The city got substantial assistance from the United States Department of Agriculture (USDA) through a program. The program was initiated by the USDA's Rural Development team, with Reading, Kansas being one such affected rural town. In August that year, a group of volunteers from Reading, Massachusetts came over to the affected Kansas counterpart to organize a relief effort. This move was orchestrated by Peter Hechenbleikner, the Massachusetts town's manager. He and those enlisted decided to help the Midwestern town, as both communities shared the same name. Reading, Kansas residents and their mayor, Lonnie Atchison, were happy and delighted with the help Reading, Massachusetts handed out during their tornado recovery.

==== FEMA issues ====
By July 2011, many of the damaged buildings in the community were cleared of debris. Homes impacted by the tornado started, or were already undergoing, reconstruction. At the same time, residents began to return to Reading. The next month in August, the rebuilding of the city was hampered by the slow process of aid from the Federal Emergency Management Agency (FEMA), which at the time was under the Obama administration. Mayor Atchison stated that the local government spent more than $50,000 fixing sewage and water lines, out of the $2 million the tornado inflicted in total damages. (Note: The aforementioned $2 million monetary figure was a preliminary estimate. The finalized measured costs were $2.28 million per the National Centers for Environmental Information. This was taken in the Storm Event Report section for Lyon County.) In the days after the tornado in late-May, Kansas senator Jerry Moran visited the impacted city. Moran, who once visited Greensburg after the EF5 tornado in 2007, expressed concerns and made note of potential bias by FEMA, in which the agency was less likely to help smaller towns after disasters such as tornadoes, compared to larger communities.

==== Reopenings and succeeding years ====
Six months after the tornado, Reading citizens celebrated the reopening of a new bank in December. It was the first of three businesses that returned to operations. At the same time, the city's only restaurant, The Miracle Cafe, reopened the following week, with owner Reta Jackson stating "the miracles never ceased" after the storm. New grain silos at Reading Grain & Lumber were constructed as well in the wake of the tornado. Some time after, the town's grade school was accessible to the public again, with six additional students enrolled. These signs of reopenings acted as morale boosters for the residents who were affected, causing many to return to the town. From 2021 and onwards, Reading continued and completed recovery efforts.

== See also ==
- Weather of 2011
- Tornadoes of 2011
- 2024 Westmoreland tornado – Another deadly EF3 tornado that impacted a rural town in Kansas nearly 13 years after
