= Seward Township =

Seward Township may refer to:

== Illinois ==
- Seward Township, Kendall County, Illinois
- Seward Township, Winnebago County, Illinois

== Indiana ==
- Seward Township, Kosciusko County, Indiana

== Kansas ==
- Seward Township, Seward County, Kansas, in Seward County, Kansas

== Minnesota ==
- Seward Township, Nobles County, Minnesota

== Oklahoma ==
- Seward Township, Logan County, Oklahoma, in Logan County, Oklahoma

== See also ==
- Seward (disambiguation)
