= Seward Township, Illinois =

Seward Township, Illinois may refer to one of the following townships:

- Seward Township, Kendall County, Illinois
- Seward Township, Winnebago County, Illinois

== See also ==
- Seward Township
