= List of tornadoes in the outbreak sequence of May 21–26, 2011 =

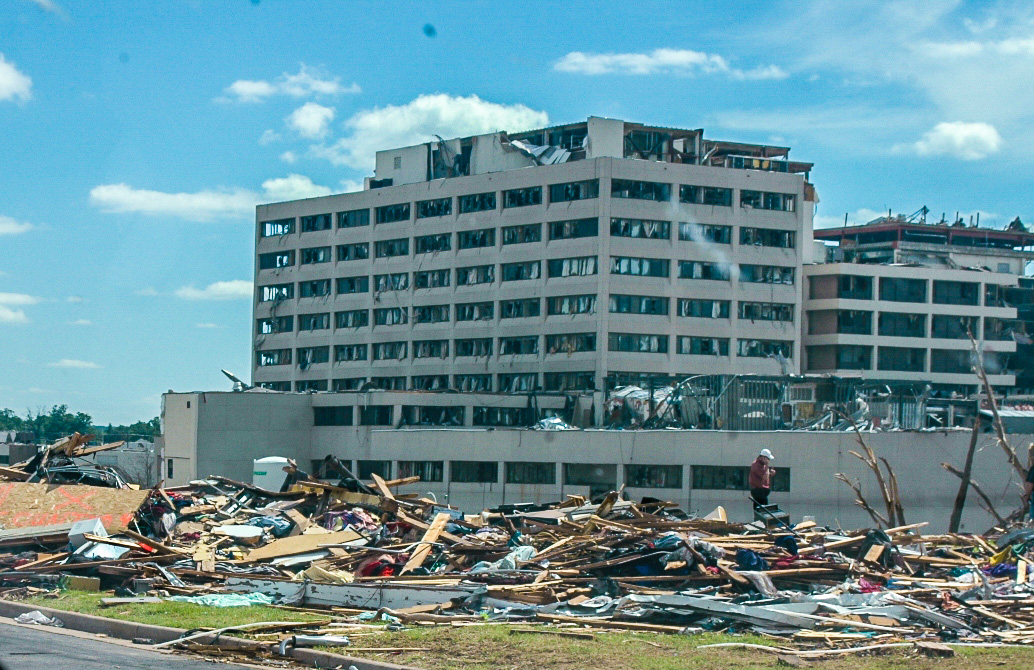
St. John's Regional Medical Center after the May 22 Joplin tornado

The following is a list of confirmed tornadoes confirmed by local offices of the National Weather Service during the tornado outbreak sequence of May 21–26, 2011 that occurred over the Midwestern and Southern United States. After a slow start to May, activity abruptly increased with a prolonged and violent tornado outbreak sequence taking place from May 21–26, resulting in 178 fatalities. An EF3 tornado struck Reading, Kansas on May 21, resulting in severe damage and one fatality. An EF5 tornado in Joplin, Missouri resulted in 158 direct fatalities on May 22, becoming one of the deadliest tornadoes in United States history. This tornado was the most severe of the outbreak, and it caused catastrophic damage across southern portions of the city of Joplin. Elsewhere on May 22, another person was killed by an EF1 tornado that struck Minneapolis, Minnesota and surrounding suburbs, and a high-end EF3 tornado moved from Delaware County, Oklahoma to McDonald County, Missouri, with numerous homes being destroyed. On May 24, a significant outbreak took place in Oklahoma and Arkansas, with another EF5 tornado and two EF4 tornadoes striking areas around Oklahoma City. These three tornadoes resulted in ten fatalities and nearly 300 injuries. Another EF4 tornado moved through Denning, Arkansas just before midnight, with four additional deaths. May 25 featured a large number of tornadoes across Missouri, Illinois, and Indiana, with several more tornadoes in other states. This activity continued into the next day, when an EF3 tornado impacted part of St. Tammany Parish, Louisiana and injured four people. Tornadic activity wound down during the evening of May 26, after several tornadoes moved through Pennsylvania and Ohio, bring the outbreak sequence to a close.

== Confirmed tornadoes ==
Confirmed tornadoes by Enhanced Fujita rating
EFU	EF0	EF1	EF2	EF3	EF4	EF5	Total
0	109	86	31	8	3	2	239

=== May 21 event ===
List of confirmed tornadoes – Saturday, May 21, 2011 (Note: All dates are based on the local time zone where the tornado touched down; however, all times are in Coordinated Universal Time for consistency.)
EF#	Location	County / Parish	State	Start Coord.	Time (UTC)	Path length	Max width	Damage (Note: All damage totals are in 2011 USD unless otherwise stated.)
EF0	W of Purmela	Coryell	TX	31.4800°N 98.0576°W	21:24–21:25	0.02 mi (32 m)	25 yd (23 m)	$0
EF0	A very brief tornado downed a few trees.							
EF0	W of Pauline	Shawnee	KS	38.9546°N 95.7609°W	23:16–23:20	1.2 mi (1.9 km)	150 yd (140 m)	Unknown
EF0	The tornado caused minor damage along its path.							
EF0	Southeastern Topeka	Shawnee	KS	39.0115°N 95.6518°W	23:35–23:39	2.03 mi (3.27 km)	50 yd (46 m)	Unknown
EF0	Minor tree and structural damage was observed near Lake Shawnee along a narrow path accompanied by rear flank downdraft damage.							
EF0	W of Hamel	Hennepin	MN	45.0420°N 93.5749°W	23:36–23:38	0.2 mi (0.32 km)	25 yd (23 m)	$0
EF0	This brief tornado touched down over an open field and moved through a grove of trees.							
EF0	W of Iowa Point	Doniphan	KS	39.9200°N 95.2700°W	23:57–23:59	0.27 mi (0.43 km)	50 yd (46 m)	$0
EF0	Minor tree damage was observed.							
EF0	WNW of Sulphur	Murray	OK	34.5211°N 97.0025°W	00:00	0.2 mi (0.32 km)	30 yd (27 m)	$0
EF0	A brief tornado caused no known damage.							
EF0	S of Ozawkie	Jefferson	KS	39.1650°N 95.4520°W	00:20–00:21	1.94 mi (3.12 km)	50 yd (46 m)	Unknown
EF0	A waterspout over Perry Lake moved ashore, producing tree damage. One tree fell on a mobile home, briefly trapping the resident.							
EF0	ESE of Fillmore	Andrew	MO	40.0019°N 94.9178°W	00:30–00:33	1.22 mi (1.96 km)	60 yd (55 m)	$7,000
EF0	Three homes sustained minor damage, and several trees were downed.							
EF1	E of Hickory to SE of Fitzhugh	Murray, Pontotoc	OK	34.5600°N 96.8336°W	00:39–00:53	7.2 mi (11.6 km)	880 yd (800 m)	$8,000
EF1	A large multi-vortex tornado downed trees and power lines.							
EF0	NW of Vanoss	Pontotoc	OK	34.7805°N 96.8949°W	01:18–01:20	1 mi (1.6 km)	50 yd (46 m)	$0
EF0	No known damage occurred with this tornado.							
EF0	NNE of Vanoss	Pontotoc	OK	34.7867°N 96.8565°W	01:29–01:33	1 mi (1.6 km)	50 yd (46 m)	$0
EF0	No known damage occurred with this tornado.							
EF1	WNW of Ada	Pontotoc	OK	34.8009°N 96.8202°W	01:41–01:47	3.3 mi (5.3 km)	150 yd (140 m)	Unknown
EF1	A few homes were damaged in the small community of Center.							
EF1	NE of Emporia	Lyon	KS	38.4453°N 96.1611°W	01:50–01:54	6.05 mi (9.74 km)	150 yd (140 m)	Unknown
EF1	Some farm outbuildings were heavily damaged, a chimney collapsed onto a home, and several large trees were snapped.							
EF0	E of Andice	Williamson	TX	30.7635°N 97.8372°W	02:00–02:05	1.59 mi (2.56 km)	30 yd (27 m)	$100,000
EF0	Several mobile homes sustained minor damage, with a carport and deck destroyed. A screened-in porch was tossed over a house, large hay bales were rolled many yards (some into a road), and several trees were downed. The tornado was observed by several local residents.							
EF3	SW of Reading to E of Barclay	Lyon, Osage	KS	38.5053°N 96.0036°W	02:10–02:30	10.11 mi (16.27 km)	700 yd (640 m)	>$2,280,000
EF3	1 death – See article on this tornado – 5 people were injured.							
EF0	S of Barclay	Osage	KS	38.5432°N 95.8968°W	02:20–02:24	1.39 mi (2.24 km)	50 yd (46 m)	Unknown
EF0	This was a satellite tornado to the Reading EF3 tornado. Several trees were blown down and a cow pen was pushed to the northeast.							
EF0	ESE of Worden	Douglas	KS	38.7525°N 95.2659°W	03:41	0.05 mi (80 m)	25 yd (23 m)	$0
EF0	A very brief tornado with no damage.							
EF1	Quenemo	Osage, Franklin	KS	38.5768°N 95.5333°W	03:43–03:52	2.89 mi (4.65 km)	100 yd (91 m)	Unknown
EF1	Several houses were damaged, two garages were destroyed, and several trees were downed.							

=== May 22 event ===
List of confirmed tornadoes – Sunday, May 22, 2011
EF#	Location	County / Parish	State	Start Coord.	Time (UTC)	Path length	Max width	Damage
EF1	St. Louis Park to Northern Minneapolis to NE of Fridley	Hennepin, Anoka, Ramsey	MN	44.9597°N 93.3472°W	19:13–19:34	13.57 mi (21.84 km)	880 yd (800 m)	$166,620,000
EF1	1 death – A large wedge tornado caused high-end EF1 damage throughout northern Minneapolis and surrounding suburban areas. At least 600 homes sustained major damage in Minneapolis, with 35 more being completely destroyed. Many trees and power lines were downed, while roofs, sheds, and garages sustained significant damage. One man was killed when a tree fell onto his car. In Anoka County, the tornado moved through an industrial area of Fridley, where numerous large warehouses were damaged, including some that lost their roofs. Eight train cars were blown over as well. The tornado weakened considerably as it moved through the northwest tip of Ramsey County and back into Anoka County. Several hangars were damaged at the Anoka County–Blaine Airport before the tornado dissipated. A second person died after suffering a heart attack while clearing debris in the wake of the tornado. Damage from the tornado was estimated at $166 million and 48 people were injured.							
EF1	SW of Park Falls	Price	WI	45.777°N 90.645°W	19:33–19:37	3.29 mi (5.29 km)	600 yd (550 m)	$4,000
EF1	A house sustained minor roof and window damage and multiple trees were snapped or uprooted.							
EF2	NE of Riceville, IA to NE of Harmony, MN	Howard (IA), Fillmore (MN)	IA, MN	43.4091°N 92.4933°W	19:33–20:29	28.68 mi (46.16 km)	250 yd (230 m)	$775,000
EF2	In Iowa, several farmhouses sustained major roof damage, outbuildings were destroyed, and widespread tree damage occurred as the tornado passed near Chester. In Minnesota, structures had their roofs torn off and silos were damaged. Three people were injured in Howard County, with a fourth indirect injury occurring in Fillmore County.							
EF0	E of Lexington	Lafayette	MO	39.18°N 93.86°W	19:38–19:40	0.25 mi (400 m)	40 yd (37 m)	$500
EF0	A brief tornado destroyed an outbuilding.							
EF2	NNW of Ladora to NW of Marengo	Iowa	IA	41.7916°N 92.2060°W	19:40–19:45	3.88 mi (6.24 km)	75 yd (69 m)	$250,000
EF2	Multiple homes were damaged, including one that lost portions of its roof, twelve power poles were snapped, and trees were downed.							
EF0	E of Ham Lake	Anoka	MN	45.2484°N 93.1623°W	19:52–19:53	0.21 mi (340 m)	30 yd (27 m)	$50,000
EF0	A brief tornado downed trees and removed shingles from a few homes.							
EF0	E of Millersburg	Iowa	IA	41.5776°N 92.0999°W	19:54–20:00	1.96 mi (3.15 km)	25 yd (23 m)	$10,000
EF0	A shed was flipped, and trees and power lines were downed.							
EF0	SE of Tripoli	Bremer	IA	42.79°N 92.23°W	20:13	0.1 mi (160 m)	30 yd (27 m)	$0
EF0	A brief tornado caused no damage.							
EF0	SE of Forest Lake	Washington	MN	45.2374°N 92.9426°W	20:16–20:20	2.64 mi (4.25 km)	75 yd (69 m)	$50,000
EF0	A metal shed was damaged, several roofs lost shingles, and trees were downed.							
EF0	N of Higginsville	Lafayette	MO	39.09°N 93.73°W	20:25–20:27	0.09 mi (140 m)	50 yd (46 m)	$0
EF0	A brief tornado in an open field caused no damage.							
EF1	E of Sumner to ENE of Randalia	Fayette	IA	42.8558°N 92.0078°W	20:37–20:45	7.87 mi (12.67 km)	70 yd (64 m)	$175,000
EF1	Several homes, barns, and grain bins were damaged, and numerous trees were downed.							
EF0	Waverly	Lafayette	MO	39.21°N 93.52°W	20:58–21:03	0.09 mi (140 m)	50 yd (46 m)	$2,500
EF0	A mobile home lost much of its roof, a garden shed was damaged, and trees were downed.							
EF1	NE of Brill	Barron	WI	45.6088°N 91.6253°W	21:00–21:05	1.98 mi (3.19 km)	300 yd (270 m)	$200,000
EF1	Roofs were torn off of a log house and farmhouse, a 12-foot (3.7 m) house antenna was blown down, and two 7-foot (2.1 m) tall horse enclosures were destroyed. Numerous large trees were downed as well. The tornado dissipated at the Washburn County line.							
EF0	E of West Union	Fayette	IA	42.9631°N 91.7316°W	21:01–21:03	1.38 mi (2.22 km)	350 yd (320 m)	$10,000
EF0	A house and a barn sustained minor roof damage, and several trees were snapped.							
EF2	WSW of Hokah, MN to E of La Crosse, WI	Houston (MN), La Crosse (WI)	MN, WI	43.7412°N 91.4574°W	21:05–21:28	13.79 mi (22.19 km)	150 yd (140 m)	$15,440,000
EF2	Significant damage to residences, barns, and farm outbuildings occurred at the beginning of the path. Many large trees were snapped or uprooted and roofs were damaged as the tornado passed near Hokah and moved across the Mississippi River. Crossing Green Island, the tornado snapped numerous large trees and caused substantial damage to an ice arena. It then moved into La Crosse, where homes sustained partial roof loss and garages were heavily damaged. Buildings in a small industrial area had partial roof and wall collapse, and a small apartment complex had its roof removed. To the east, more homes and garages were damaged and trees were downed before the tornado dissipated just east of town. In La Crosse, an estimated 200 homes and businesses were damaged and 15 were completely destroyed. This was the first tornado to strike La Crosse since 1966. An estimated 6,300 customers in La Crosse lost power as a result of the tornado.							
EF0	WSW of Parsons	Labette	KS	37.3244°N 95.3215°W	21:10–21:11	0.33 mi (530 m)	50 yd (46 m)	$0
EF0	A brief tornado in an open field caused no damage.							
EF1	N of Rensselaer	Jasper	IN	40.9607°N 87.1563°W	21:37–21:38	0.32 mi (510 m)	33 yd (30 m)	$25,000
EF1	A Farm Bureau Insurance building sustained roof damage, and a Purdue Agricultural Extension office had window, soffit, and fascia damage.							
EF1	SW of Rockland to Sparta	La Crosse, Monroe	WI	40.9607°N 87.1563°W	21:47–22:00	8.18 mi (13.16 km)	125 yd (114 m)	$920,000
EF1	A few trees and buildings were damaged at the beginning of the path. In Monroe County, a house and four mobile homes were destroyed east of Rockland before the tornado struck Sparta, where 50 homes were damaged. At a car dealership on the south side of Sparta, a car was tossed 40 feet (12 m) and flipped upside down, and a billboard was knocked over onto a truck.							
EF1	E of Slater	Saline	MO	39.22°N 93.06°W	21:50–21:57	3.53 mi (5.68 km)	75 yd (69 m)	$230,000
EF1	A high-end EF1 tornado produced sporadic damage, destroying a house near Slater and tossing a single-wide mobile home 50 yards (46 m) near Gilliam. Outbuildings sustained minor damage as well.							
EF2	NW of Tomah to SE of Plover	Monroe, Juneau, Wood, Portage	WI	44.0429°N 90.5657°W	22:15–23:46	64.5 mi (103.8 km)	800 yd (730 m)	$7,730,000
EF2	A very long-lived tornado tracked through mostly wooded areas of west-central Wisconsin, snapping or uprooting thousands of trees and power poles, some of which landed on homes. A house and a mobile home were destroyed at the beginning of the path, and a third home was heavily damaged. The tornado tracked through the Necedah National Wildlife Refuge in Juneau County, and a cranberry farm sustained major damage near Finley, with outbuildings and sheds being demolished and a loading deck platform and trucks being heavily damaged. Homes sustained minor roof and siding damage near the Wood–Juneau county line before a campground along the Wisconsin River south of Nekoosa sustained major damage. Over 100 pines trees were downed, with some damaging numerous camper trailers. Homes and outbuildings were heavily damaged south of Wisconsin Rapids, with a garage losing its entire roof. One person in the garage was injured when it collapsed on a truck. South of Plover, roughly one-half mile of power poles were bent over, and a farmstead was heavily damaged north of Keene. Numerous silos, barns, and outbuildings were destroyed along the path, and at least two dozen irrigation systems were overturned or damaged. The tornado was on the ground for 91 minutes and was one of the longest-tracked tornadoes in Wisconsin history.							
EF5	SW of Joplin to ESE of Diamond	Newton, Jasper	MO	37.0524°N 94.5932°W	22:34 – 23:20	22.1 mi (35.6 km)	1,760 yd (1.00 mi)	$2.800102×10^{9}
EF5	158 deaths – See article on this tornado – The tornado began in Newton County at EF2 intensity before continuing into Jasper County and producing catastrophic EF4 to EF5 damage in Joplin. The tornado reentered Newton County, weakening back to EF2 strength before dissipating east of Diamond. An estimated 1,150 people were injured, and damage amounted to approximately $2.8 billion.							
EF0	W of Prentice	Price	WI	45.538°N 90.400°W	22:39–22:41	1.15 mi (1.85 km)	350 yd (320 m)	$1,000
EF0	A metal barn sustained minor damage, and several trees were downed.							
EF0	NW of Prentice	Price	WI	45.608°N 90.333°W	22:52–22:53	1.12 mi (1.80 km)	400 yd (370 m)	$0
EF0	Trees were downed.							
EF0	E of Phillips	Price	WI	45.675°N 90.256°W	23:01–23:04	2.14 mi (3.44 km)	350 yd (320 m)	$5,000
EF0	Trees were snapped or uprooted, a small shed was destroyed, and a metal barn sustained roof damage.							
EF2	ENE of Diamond to N of Monett	Newton, Lawrence	MO	37.0052°N 94.1877°W	23:10–23:40	14.13 mi (22.74 km)	800 yd (730 m)	$1,000,000
EF2	This large wedge tornado touched down as the Joplin EF5 tornado weakened to the west. Minor tree and roof damage occurred at the beginning of the path before the tornado intensified and destroyed three mobile homes, one of which was wrapped around a tree. Numerous trees and power poles were downed nearby. The tornado struck Wentworth at EF1 strength, removing the roof from an outbuilding and downing numerous trees in town. The tornado regained EF2 strength past Wentworth, where a mobile home was wrapped around a building and a machine shop was partially destroyed. Trees, fences, frame homes, and outbuildings were damaged at EF1 strength further to the east before the tornado dissipated.							
EF0	NE of Jacksboro	Jack	TX	33.3108°N 98.0409°W	23:20–23:21	0.03 mi (48 m)	50 yd (46 m)	$0
EF0	A few trees were downed.							
EF1	E of Forreston to Machesney Park	Ogle, Winnebago	IL	42.1257°N 89.5406°W	23:25–23:54	29.14 mi (46.90 km)	200 yd (180 m)	$150,000
EF1	In Ogle County, two mobile homes were heavily damaged near Adeline, and multiple power poles were snapped or pushed over. In Winnebago County, Kennedy Middle School in Machesney Park had part of its roof blown off, numerous trees were downed, homes sustained minor damage (mainly to shingles, siding, and fascia), and outbuildings were destroyed, with debris scattered up to 400 yards (370 m) away in some cases.							
EF0	NE of Phillips	Price	WI	45.85°N 90.08°W	23:26–23:27	0.8 mi (1.3 km)	275 yd (251 m)	$0
EF0	Several trees were downed in the Chequamegon National Forest.							
EF1	SE of Polo	Ogle	IL	41.9739°N 89.5696°W	23:28–23:31	1.67 mi (2.69 km)	200 yd (180 m)	$50,000
EF1	Several farm buildings and grain bins were damaged, including one grain bin that was ripped from its foundation and one cattle shed that lost its roof. Several beef cattle in the shed were injured, one fatally. Several 2x4's were found speared into the ground, and insulation was plastered against nearby buildings. Shingles were torn from roofs, and multiple trees and power poles were snapped.							
EF2	S of Cleora to SW of Grove	Delaware	OK	36.5530°N 94.9733°W	23:33–23:48	6.7 mi (10.8 km)	800 yd (730 m)	$1,000,000
EF2	A large stovepipe tornado caused major damage along Grand Lake o' the Cherokees. Multiple frame homes were damaged, some heavily. Seven mobile homes were completely destroyed, along with several boat docks. Numerous large trees were snapped or uprooted along the path, which crossed the lake once before dissipating over the lake during a second crossing.							
EF1	NNE of Stillman Valley	Ogle	IL	42.1465°N 89.1759°W	23:40–23:42	0.5 mi (0.80 km)	100 yd (91 m)	$50,000
EF1	A brief tornado destroyed a wood truss electrical transmission line tower, tore off the gable and part of the roof of a house, peeled soffit and shingles from a couple other houses, and overturned semi-truck trailers. Several trees and limbs were downed as well.							
EF1	NE of Neodesha	Wagoner	OK	42.1465°N 89.1759°W	23:42–23:48	3.5 mi (5.6 km)	300 yd (270 m)	$0
EF1	Numerous large trees were snapped or uprooted.							
EF3	WSW of Zena, OK to NNE of Southwest City, MO	Delaware (OK), McDonald (MO)	OK, MO	36.4812°N 94.8951°W	23:52–00:36	17.93 mi (28.86 km)	1,550 yd (1,420 m)	$2,000,000
EF3	See section on this tornado – 4 people were injured.							
EF1	W of Machesney Park	Winnebago	IL	42.3720°N 89.1681°W	23:55–23:58	2.73 mi (4.39 km)	50 yd (46 m)	Unknown
EF1	A tornado embedded within a larger area of straight-line winds northeast of Wempletown snapped or uprooted numerous trees, a few of which landed on homes.							
EF1	Eastern Rockton	Winnebago	IL	42.4584°N 89.0128°W	23:59–00:01	0.9 mi (1.4 km)	50 yd (46 m)	$15,000
EF1	A brief tornado blew in a large garage door at a fire station just west of I-39/90.							
EF2	NW of Galena to S of Saddlebrooke	Stone, Taney	MO	36.8347°N 93.5013°W	00:10–00:35	15.7 mi (25.3 km)	200 yd (180 m)	$1,050,000
EF2	A mobile home was destroyed, while a second mobile home and several turkey barns were damaged. A few homes sustained roof and siding damage, and outbuildings were heavily damaged. Numerous trees were snapped or uprooted along the track, and a tower structure was damaged just before the tornado dissipated.							
EF1	ESE of Peggs	Cherokee	OK	36.0714°N 95.0628°W	00:27–00:35	3 mi (4.8 km)	250 yd (230 m)	$70,000
EF1	A mobile home was destroyed, a permanent home sustained roof damage, and several trees were snapped or uprooted.							
EF0	SSW of Kingston	Green Lake	WI	43.6582°N 89.1851°W	00:33–00:34	0.36 mi (580 m)	30 yd (27 m)	$1,000
EF0	A brief, weak tornado damaged a door on a shed, damaged a greenhouse, and broke tree limbs.							
EF0	Markesan to Utley	Green Lake	WI	43.7153°N 88.9926°W	00:47–00:55	4.21 mi (6.78 km)	50 yd (46 m)	$5,000
EF0	Several trees and branches were broken, with some falling on power lines.							
EF0	W of Scraper	Cherokee	OK	36.0979°N 94.8874°W	00:50	0.1 mi (160 m)	50 yd (46 m)	$0
EF0	A brief tornado in an open field caused no damage.							
EF1	NW of Leach to N of Twin Oaks	Delaware	OK	36.2291°N 94.9451°W	01:13–01:25	4.7 mi (7.6 km)	400 yd (370 m)	$25,000
EF1	Several homes and barns were damaged, and a number of large trees were snapped or uprooted.							
EF2	SE of Kansas	Adair, Delaware	OK	36.1389°N 94.7574°W	01:14–01:27	4.5 mi (7.2 km)	200 yd (180 m)	$250,000
EF2	Several homes were heavily damaged, and numerous trees were snapped or uprooted.							
EF0	NE of Twin Oaks	Delaware	OK	36.2182°N 94.8433°W	01:29–01:30	1 mi (1.6 km)	100 yd (91 m)	$0
EF0	A brief tornado over open country northwest of the town of Kansas caused no damage.							
EF2	Dripping Springs to NW of West Siloam Springs	Delaware	OK	36.1704°N 94.6639°W	01:30–01:37	2.9 mi (4.7 km)	350 yd (320 m)	$400,000
EF2	Six mobile homes were destroyed in the Dripping Springs/Moseley area, with twelve people being injured. Several vehicles were rolled, a barn was destroyed, and many trees were snapped or uprooted.							
EF1	NW of West Siloam Springs	Delaware	OK	36.1845°N 94.6387°W	01:36–01:40	1.7 mi (2.7 km)	150 yd (140 m)	$0
EF1	A second tornado formed in the Moseley area, just south of the previous tornado. Large trees were snapped or uprooted.							
EF0	E of Tolley	Renville	ND	48.7300°N 101.7103°W	01:41–01:42	0.14 mi (230 m)	25 yd (23 m)	$0
EF0	A brief tornado witnessed by law enforcement caused no damage.							
EF1	N of West Siloam Springs	Delaware	OK	36.1975°N 94.5859°W	01:44–01:45	0.5 miles (0.80 km)	100 yd (91 m)	$0
EF1	Several trees were snapped or uprooted.							
EF1	WSW of Gentry	Benton	AR	36.2418°N 94.5330°W	01:54–02:00	2.8 mi (4.5 km)	450 yd (410 m)	$25,000
EF1	Several barns and outbuildings were either damaged or destroyed, and numerous large trees were snapped or uprooted.							

=== May 23 event ===
List of confirmed tornadoes – Monday, May 23, 2011
EF#	Location	County / Parish	State	Start Coord.	Time (UTC)	Path length	Max width	Damage
EF0	ENE of Moody	Howell	MO	36.54°N 91.92°W	18:45–18:55	1 mi (1.6 km)	100 yd (91 m)	$10,000
EF0	An unsecured carport was thrown 150 yards (140 m), a home sustained minor roof damage, and a few trees and tree limbs were downed.							
EF0	NNW of Shawneetown	Cape Girardeau	MO	37.5803°N 89.6602°W	20:54–20:56	0.48 mi (0.77 km)	40 yd (37 m)	$1,000
EF0	A brief tornado caused minor tree damage. Eyewitness reports indicated that there was visible debris when the tornado was on the ground.							
EF2	E of Cocolamus to SSE of Richfield	Juniata	PA	40.6521°N 77.1909°W	21:23–21:31	4.71 mi (7.58 km)	250 yd (230 m)	$50,000
EF2	Severe damage occurred in the Kellerville area, where homes had their roofs torn off and were shifted from their foundations, numerous sheds and outbuildings were destroyed, and a concrete silo was collapsed onto a barn, killing seven cows. Many trees were snapped and uprooted along the path.							
EF0	NW of Okeene	Blaine	OK	36.1445°N 98.3439°W	21:26–21:28	0.31 mi (500 m)	15 yd (14 m)	$0
EF0	Storm chasers observed a brief tornado over open country that caused no damage.							
EF0	N of Mt. Etna	Huntington	IN	40.7866°N 85.5659°W	21:32–21:33	0.37 mi (600 m)	30 yd (27 m)	$0
EF0	Several trees were downed.							
EF1	N of Winfield	Union, Northumberland	PA	40.9183°N 76.8619°W	21:39–21:42	1.24 mi (2.00 km)	100 yd (91 m)	$50,000
EF1	Several homes were damaged, some heavily. Outbuildings and a two-story cinder-block shed were destroyed, with debris found embedded into nearby trees. Many trees were downed as well, some of which landed on homes in addition to recreational vehicles and a pavilion at a campground.							
EF0	SSW of McMillan	Luce, Mackinac	MI	46.2625°N 85.7272°W	22:15–22:21	2.4 mi (3.9 km)	50 yd (46 m)	$0
EF0	A brief waterspout over Manistique Lake caused no damage.							
EF1	SE of Equality to ENE of Shawneetown	Gallatin	IL	37.7044°N 88.2977°W	22:25–22:35	11.84 mi (19.05 km)	200 yd (180 m)	$250,000
EF1	Several homes and buildings in the Junction and Shawneetown areas sustained minor to moderate damage. Several barns or sheds were destroyed, and dozens of trees were snapped or uprooted.							
EF1	SE of Brockton	Schuylkill	PA	40.7370°N 76.0501°W	22:37–22:38	0.22 mi (350 m)	75 yd (69 m)	$20,000
EF1	A brief tornado embedded in a larger area of downburst winds snapped about 25 trees.							
EF0	S of Sunman	Ripley, Dearborn	IN	39.202°N 85.107°W	22:43–22:47	3.08 mi (4.96 km)	50 yd (46 m)	$45,000
EF0	A barn was destroyed, a pole barn had its roof torn off, a power pole was snapped, and trees were downed.							
EF0	E of Fairfax	Osage	OK	36.5722°N 96.6938°W	22:52	0.1 mi (160 m)	50 yd (46 m)	$0
EF0	A brief tornado over open country caused no damage.							
EF1	SW of Ohio City	Van Wert	OH	40.7541°N 84.6896°W	22:56–23:02	4.11 mi (6.61 km)	100 yd (91 m)	Unknown
EF1	Multiple barns were damaged, siding was stripped from a house, and a wooden swing-set was tossed. Large trees were uprooted, 2x4s were embedded into the ground, and sheet metal was wrapped around trees as well. The tornado reportedly displayed a double funnel momentarily before merging into a single funnel.							
EF0	Weissport East	Carbon	PA	40.8371°N 75.6953°W	23:25–23:26	0.43 mi (690 m)	50 yd (46 m)	$75,000
EF0	One home was badly damaged and about a dozen others sustained minor damage, along with a church and a baseball field. A trampoline was blown 30 feet (9.1 m) while a second trampoline was tossed into the church's sign. A metal shed was damaged, a swing set was toppled, and numerous trees were downed as well. One person was injured by a collapsed wall.							
EF2	SW of Big Rock, TN to NW of Pembroke, KY	Stewart (TN), Montgomery (TN), Christian (KY)	TN, KY	36.5497°N 87.8276°W	23:52–00:27	30.29 mi (48.75 km)	175 yd (160 m)	$612,000
EF2	In Tennessee, the tornado caused heavy roof damage to several homes, including one that lost its entire roof. Two people were injured in this area when their mobile home was destroyed, with debris scattered downwind. The tornado passed through the northwestern tip of Montgomery County on Fort Campbell before crossing the state line. In Kentucky, multiple barns and grain bins were destroyed. In one collapsed barn, 45 dairy cows were trapped, although only two were injured; one cow nearby was thrown 500 feet (150 m). The roof was torn off of an agricultural chemical storage building, a tool barn was destroyed, and a semi-truck was flipped on Interstate 24, injuring the driver. Numerous trees were snapped and uprooted, one of which fell on a house near Pembroke. Three people were injured in total.							
EF0	ESE of Edenton	Clermont	OH	39.215°N 84.013°W	23:43–23:44	0.21 mi (340 m)	33 yd (30 m)	$30,000
EF0	A wood-frame metal barn was destroyed, with debris scattered up to 400 yards away, two high-voltage towers were blown down, and trees and tree limbs were snapped.							
EF1	E of Fairborn	Greene	OH	39.7964°N 83.9634°W	23:55–23:56	0.95 mi (1.53 km)	100 yd (91 m)	$3,000
EF1	Many trees were snapped or uprooted as the tornado moved through a golf course.							
EF1	NNE of Springfield	Clark	OH	39.9909°N 83.7618°W	00:10–00:11	0.4 mi (640 m)	100 yd (91 m)	$18,000
EF1	Concrete blocks were lifted onto a roof, four power poles were downed, and a house had insulation pulled out of it. A convergent pattern was noted in a wheat field as well.							

=== May 24 event ===
List of confirmed tornadoes – Tuesday, May 24, 2011
EF#	Location	County / Parish	State	Start Coord.	Time (UTC)	Path length	Max width	Damage
EF0	W of Satanta	Haskell	KS	37.421°N 101.068°W	19:35–19:38	0.48 mi (770 m)	50 yd (46 m)	$0
EF0	A brief tornado over open country lofted dust and vegetation but caused no damage.							
EF0	E of Lamar	Prowers	CO	38.0860°N 102.5262°W	20:10–20:15	0.25 mi (400 m)	75 yd (69 m)	$0
EF0	A brief landspout tornado confirmed by the Colorado Department of Transportation caused no damage.							
EF3	WNW of Canton to SW of Fairview	Dewey, Blaine, Major	OK	36.059°N 98.644°W	20:20–20:44	13.2 mi (21.2 km)	880 yd (800 m)	Unknown
EF3	1 death – See section on this tornado – 2 people were injured.							
EF3	WSW of Lookeba to SSE of Hinton	Caddo	OK	35.350°N 98.441°W	20:31–20:46	8.6 mi (13.8 km)	800 yd (730 m)	Unknown
EF3	This large multiple-vortex wedge tornado either heavily damaged or destroyed several structures, mangled/debarked many trees, and snapped several power poles. It preceded the EF5 tornado that tracked from east of Hinton to Guthrie, Oklahoma, dissipating just four minutes before the EF5 tornado formed. Initial surveys listed this damage path as part of the same tornado but follow up investigations of mobile radar observations and damage path surveys revealed that this was a separate tornado.							
EF0	NW of Ingalls	Gray	KS	37.923°N 100.543°W	20:34–20:36	0.44 mi (710 m)	50 yd (46 m)	$0
EF0	A brief, weak tornado over open country caused no damage.							
EF0	SSE of Eminence	Finney	KS	38.02°N 100.44°W	20:45–20:46	0.3 mi (480 m)	50 yd (46 m)	$0
EF0	A brief, weak tornado over open country caused no damage.							
EF0	SW of Fairview	Major	OK	36.236°N 98.507°W	20:47–20:51	0.7 mi (1.1 km)	80 yd (73 m)	$0
EF0	This tornado was observed by spotters. It remained over open country and caused no damage.							
EF5	ESE of Hinton to Piedmont to NE of Guthrie	Canadian, Kingfisher, Logan	OK	35.444°N 98.287°W	20:50–22:35	63.1 mi (101.5 km)	1,760 yd (1,610 m)	Unknown
EF5	9 deaths – See article on this tornado – 181 people were injured.							
EF0	Bolton to Hansonville	Russell	VA	36.80°N 82.22°W	20:55–20:58	4.24 mi (6.82 km)	50 yd (46 m)	$30,000
EF0	Several trees were downed along the path, which paralleled U.S. Highway 58A.							
EF0	NW of Richland	Canadian	OK	35.622°N 97.856°W	21:37–21:39	1.5 mi (2.4 km)	50 yd (46 m)	$0
EF0	A small satellite tornado to the larger EF5 tornado was observed to be rotating around the parent storm just west of Piedmont by an employee of the Storm Prediction Center. The tornado produced no known damage.							
EF2	SE of Seward to SW of Great Bend	Stafford, Barton	KS	38.153°N 98.705°W	21:52–22:13	11.81 mi (19.01 km)	500 yd (460 m)	Unknown
EF2	2 deaths – A house had its roof torn off, and a large tree next to the driveway crushed a van parked nearby, killing two of the occupants and severely injuring a third. Outbuildings and fences were also damaged, and numerous trees were downed.							
EF4	Chickasha to WSW of Moore	Grady, McClain, Cleveland	OK	35.008°N 97.961°W	22:06–23:02	33.3 mi (53.6 km)	880 yd (800 m)	Unknown
EF4	1 death – See article on this tornado – 48 people were injured.							
EF1	NW of Ellinwood	Barton	KS	38.3697°N 98.5803°W	22:09–22:17	5.14 mi (8.27 km)	75 yd (69 m)	$250,000
EF1	Three farmsteads were struck, with barns, sheds, and farm houses sustaining moderate to heavy damage. One person was injured.							
EF0	SE of Timken	Rush	KS	38.441°N 99.156°W	22:20–22:25	0.64 mi (1.03 km)	75 yd (69 m)	$0
EF0	A brief, small tornado over open country caused no damage.							
EF4	W of Bradley to Goldsby	Grady, McClain	OK	34.880°N 97.732°W	22:26–23:05	23.1 mi (37.2 km)	880 yd (800 m)	Unknown
EF4	See article on this tornado – 61 people were injured.							
EF0	E of Timken to NE of Bison	Rush	KS	38.4739°N 99.1495°W	22:35–22:49	6.15 mi (9.90 km)	1,200 yd (1,100 m)	Unknown
EF0	A large multiple-vortex wedge tornado was observed by storm chasers and remained mostly over open country. Due to extensive flooding afterward, much of the path was inaccessible and the extent of the damage is unknown.							
EF0	SW of Newcastle	McClain	OK	35.242°N 97.628°W	22:45–22:46	0.7 mi (1.1 km)	50 yd (46 m)	$0
EF0	A brief satellite tornado to the EF4 Chickasha tornado caused minimal damage.							
EF0	SE of St. Jo	Montague	TX	33.6795°N 97.5054°W	22:46–22:47	0.02 mi (32 m)	30 yd (27 m)	$0
EF0	A brief tornado downed a few trees.							
EF2	SSW of Stillwater	Payne	OK	36.034°N 97.163°W	22:50–23:05	10.4 mi (16.7 km)	880 yd (800 m)	Unknown
EF2	Several homes and other structures sustained significant roof, siding, and chimney damage, and several barns and outbuildings were either heavily damaged or destroyed. Extensive tree and power line damage occurred as well. 18 people were injured.							
EF1	SE of Rozel	Pawnee	KS	38.145°N 99.387°W	23:01–23:14	4.67 mi (7.52 km)	200 yd (180 m)	$110,000
EF1	Irrigation sprinklers were damaged, and trees were downed.							
EF1	SE of Goldsby	McClain	OK	35.109°N 97.451°W	23:02–23:03	0.5 mi (0.80 km)	40 yd (37 m)	Unknown
EF1	A satellite tornado to the EF4 Goldsby tornado inflicted damage to barns.							
EF0	SSE of Rush Center	Pawnee	KS	38.278°N 99.255°W	23:27–23:31	1.32 mi (2.12 km)	150 yd (140 m)	$0
EF0	This tornado remained over open country and caused no damage.							
EF2	SSW of McLoud	Pottawatomie	OK	35.373°N 97.131°W	23:36–23:39	2 mi (3.2 km)	50 yd (46 m)	Unknown
EF2	A narrow but strong tornado tore the roof off a telephone company building, caused extensive tree damage, and damaged several sheds. Several homes sustained roof and window damage, one of which also had its attached garage destroyed. The tornado was broadcast live on television as it tossed a semi-truck from I-40 and destroyed it. 32 people were injured.							
EF0	NE of Nocona	Montague	TX	33.8632°N 97.6434°W	23:40–23:41	0.01 mi (16 m)	30 yd (27 m)	$0
EF0	A brief tornado on the east side of Lake Nocona remained over open country and caused no damage.							
EF1	W of Hominy	Osage	OK	36.4103°N 96.5812°W	23:44–23:47	2.8 mi (4.5 km)	40 yd (37 m)	$0
EF1	Trees were uprooted, and tree limbs were snapped.							
EF2	NW of Hominy to WNW of Pawhuska	Osage	OK	36.465°N 96.576°W	23:49–00:14	17 mi (27 km)	750 yd (690 m)	$20,000
EF2	Many trees were downed, and power poles were snapped.							
EF0	E of Hoisington	Barton	KS	38.5256°N 98.6830°W	00:11–00:12	0.37 mi (600 m)	50 yd (46 m)	$0
EF0	This brief tornado occurred over open country and caused no damage.							
EF0	NNE of Claflin	Barton	KS	38.5353°N 98.5439°W	00:22–00:25	3.38 mi (5.44 km)	50 yd (46 m)	$0
EF0	A weak tornado moved over open country and caused no damage.							
EF1	N of Ravia to N of Tishomingo	Johnston	OK	34.252°N 96.760°W	00:30–00:45	5.5 mi (8.9 km)	1,200 yd (1,100 m)	Unknown
EF1	A large multiple-vortex tornado struck rural areas, where widespread tree damage occurred. Two homes were damaged by falling trees, four other homes sustained roof damage due to wind, and a grain silo lost its roof.							
EF0	SW of Gainesville	Cooke	TX	33.5088°N 97.2695°W	00:32–00:36	1.56 mi (2.51 km)	100 yd (91 m)	$0
EF0	A brief tornado caused minor tree damage; it was videoed on the ground for approximately four minutes.							
EF0	NNE of Rhome	Wise	TX	33.0814°N 97.4511°W	00:38–00:39	0.03 mi (48 m)	30 yd (27 m)	$2,000
EF0	A brief tornado caused minor damage to barns.							
EF0	SW of Reno	Parker	TX	32.9177°N 97.6105°W	00:38–00:40	0.42 mi (0.68 km)	40 yd (37 m)	$10,000
EF0	A tornado just northwest of Sanctuary damaged the roof of a mobile home and downed several trees.							
EF0	E of Azle	Tarrant	TX	32.880°N 97.490°W	00:45–00:47	1.69 mi (2.72 km)	50 yd (46 m)	$1,000
EF0	A tornado was observed over Eagle Mountain Lake, with minor tree damage noted on the eastern shore.							
EF0	N of Wilson	Ellsworth	KS	38.8508°N 98.4784°W	00:50–00:52	0.45 mi (0.72 km)	50 yd (46 m)	$1,000
EF0	A brief tornado occurred over open country caused no damage.							
EF2	SW of Denton	Denton	TX	33.1359°N 97.1911°W	00:51–00:56	1.52 mi (2.45 km)	220 yd (200 m)	$750,000
EF2	A strong rope tornado moved through a subdivision of between Argyle and Denton, causing major roof damage to several homes, two of which sustained EF2 damage. A barn was destroyed and trees were downed as well.							
EF1	Irving	Dallas	TX	32.8291°N 96.9811°W	01:23–01:30	1.37 mi (2.20 km)	500 yd (460 m)	$150,000
EF1	A few apartment buildings and several houses sustained severe roof damage, with roofing material removed, chimneys collapsed, and air-conditioning units destroyed. A metal roof was torn off a retail building, with other businesses sustaining lesser damage. Many trees were downed as well, one of which fell through the second story of a home.							
EF2	SW of Haskell to SSW of Redbird	Muskogee, Wagoner	OK	35.7631°N 95.7423°W	01:42–02:00	10.2 mi (16.4 km)	400 yd (370 m)	$110,000
EF2	The tornado moved through Haskell, where a mobile home and a barn were destroyed, several homes were damaged, and large trees and several power poles were snapped.							
EF2	ESE of Wagoner	Wagoner	OK	35.9420°N 95.3754°W	02:13–02:20	4.4 mi (7.1 km)	450 yd (410 m)	$400,000
EF2	This tornado began on the south side of Wagoner and moved eastward toward Fort Gibson Reservoir. In Wagoner, about a dozen homes sustained roof damage and a carport was destroyed. East of town, numerous campers and trailers were severely damaged or destroyed, several mobile homes were destroyed, and several more permanent homes were damaged. Numerous large trees were either snapped or uprooted along the path.							
EF0	SW of Balch Springs	Dallas	TX	32.6709°N 96.6841°W	02:48	0.01 mi (16 m)	30 yd (27 m)	$0
EF0	A brief tornado along I-20 near the Trinity River caused minor tree damage.							
EF1	NW of Leach to N of Twin Oaks	Delaware	OK	36.2264°N 94.9542°W	02:48–02:59	7 mi (11 km)	150 yd (140 m)	$0
EF1	Trees were uprooted, and tree limbs were snapped.							
EF1	NNE of Panola	Latimer	OK	35.0021°N 95.2106°W	02:50–02:55	2.5 mi (4.0 km)	300 yd (270 m)	$0
EF1	Hundreds of trees were either snapped or uprooted in a rugged area of the Sans Bois Mountains. The start and end points were inaccessible, and the survey was done via an ATV.							
EF1	NW of Colcord	Delaware	OK	36.2757°N 94.7575°W	03:06–03:16	6 mi (9.7 km)	150 yd (140 m)	$0
EF1	Trees were uprooted, and large tree limbs were snapped.							
EF0	SSE of Talihina	Le Flore	OK	34.6942°N 95.0378°W	03:14–03:16	1.5 mi (2.4 km)	100 yd (91 m)	$0
EF0	This tornado observed over open country; no damage occurred.							
EF0	W of Cedarvale	Kaufman	TX	32.5755°N 96.1109°W	03:43–03:44	0.01 mi (16 m)	20 yd (18 m)	$0
EF0	A brief tornado caused minor tree damage.							
EF2	WSW of Hodgen to NE of Howe	Le Flore	OK	34.8256°N 94.7248°W	03:44–04:02	12 mi (19 km)	1,760 yd (1,610 m)	$100,000
EF2	A mobile home was destroyed, several permanent homes were damaged, dozens of power poles were snapped, and numerous large trees were either snapped or uprooted.							
EF1	NE of Roland, OK to NW of Van Buren, AR	Sequoyah (OK), Crawford (AR)	OK, AR	35.4400°N 94.4595°W	04:37–04:47	5.2 mi (8.4 km)	800 yd (730 m)	$50,000
EF1	Many trees were knocked down in Oklahoma before the tornado crossed into Arkansas, where siding was blown off a metal building, several homes were damaged, several barns were destroyed, and more trees were downed.							
EF4	S of Branch to Denning to SE of Rosetta	Franklin, Logan, Johnson	AR	35.2781°N 93.9515°W	04:53–05:50	45.71 mi (73.56 km)	2,200 yd (2,000 m)	$9,075,000
EF4	4 deaths – See section on this tornado – 27 people were injured.							

=== May 25 event ===
List of confirmed tornadoes – Wednesday, May 25, 2011
EF#	Location	County / Parish	State	Start Coord.	Time (UTC)	Path length	Max width	Damage
EF3	SW of Clarksville to SW of Pelsor	Johnson, Pope	AR	35.4227°N 93.5302°W	05:25–05:57	29.01 mi (46.69 km)	1,430 yd (1,310 m)	$13,025,000
EF3	1 death – See section on this tornado – 4 people were injured. The section of the path in Clarksville was very similar to an F3 tornado that occurred on April 7, 1980.							
EF1	SW of Dogwood to SE of Seymour	Douglas, Webster	MO	37.030°N 92.840°W	06:30–06:45	9.27 mi (14.92 km)	100 yd (91 m)	$20,000
EF1	A house sustained minor roof damage, several outbuildings were damaged or destroyed, and numerous trees were either snapped or uprooted along the path.							
EF1	ENE of Decatur	Macon	IL	39.8570°N 88.8445°W	12:35–12:37	0.99 mi (1.59 km)	75 yd (69 m)	$165,000
EF1	Two outbuildings and two grain bins were damaged.							
EF1	NE of Oakley	Macon	IL	39.8804°N 88.7739°W	12:39–12:42	1.48 mi (2.38 km)	75 yd (69 m)	$100,000
EF1	An outbuilding was destroyed, and a grain bin was damaged.							
EF1	Leesville to NE of Hopkins Park	Kankakee	IL	41.0229°N 87.6272°W	14:04–14:12	5.78 mi (9.30 km)	50 yd (46 m)	$250,000
EF1	Several houses sustained mainly roof damage, a camper was overturned, and two concrete block buildings were destroyed, along with a grain bin and storage sheds. One home that was under construction had an attached garage ripped off, and trees and power poles were snapped along the path.							
EF0	W of Morocco	Newton	IN	40.9409°N 87.4637°W	14:13–14:14	0.1 mi (160 m)	20 yd (18 m)	$25,000
EF0	A brief tornado snapped tree limbs and collapsed a barn.							
EF2	S of Mount Ayr	Newton	IN	40.9110°N 87.3088°W	14:19–14:21	1.9 mi (3.1 km)	300 yd (270 m)	$50,000
EF2	A house and a shed were damaged, with a small swath of corn strewn between the structures. Wooden projectiles from the shed left gouge marks in the ground. A grain bin was blown 200 yards (180 m), and an auger weighing over 100 pounds (45 kg) was thrown up to 150 feet (46 m). Several large trees and ten power poles were snapped as well.							
EF1	NW of Rensselaer	Jasper	IN	40.9409°N 87.2104°W	14:24–14:27	2.91 mi (4.68 km)	100 yd (91 m)	$500
EF1	Many trees were either snapped or uprooted, and a wooden light pole was snapped.							
EF1	Southern Rensselaer	Jasper	IN	40.9144°N 87.1612°W	14:26–14:28	1.95 mi (3.14 km)	100 yd (91 m)	$50,000
EF1	A tornado struck the south side of Rensselaer, where shingles were removed from structures, a truck was overturned, and trees and power lines were downed.							
EF0	Francesville	Pulaski	IN	40.9829°N 86.8936°W	14:45–14:46	0.78 mi (1.26 km)	50 yd (46 m)	Unknown
EF0	A pole barn was destroyed, and several trees and power poles were knocked down in Francesville.							
EF0	Louisburg	Miami	KS	38.6175°N 94.6878°W	15:45–15:47	0.05 mi (80 m)	40 yd (37 m)	$5,000
EF0	A truck was overturned, and several buildings sustained minor damage on the west side of town.							
EF0	Southern Overland Park	Johnson	KS	38.8333°N 94.6419°W	16:10–16:12	0.68 mi (1.09 km)	60 yd (55 m)	$10,000
EF0	A brief tornado in the Stanley neighborhood of Overland Park caused roof damage to Blue Valley Middle School and downed several trees.							
EF0	Southern Overland Park	Johnson	KS	38.8831°N 94.6669°W	16:22	0.05 mi (80 m)	40 yd (37 m)	$0
EF0	A second tornado near the Stanley neighborhood touched down briefly in a suburban area, causing no noticeable damage.							
EF0	SE of Harrisonville	Cass	MO	38.6200°N 94.3008°W	16:35	0.05 mi (80 m)	40 yd (37 m)	$0
EF0	A brief tornado caused no damage.							
EF0	Lenexa	Johnson	KS	38.9569°N 94.7331°W	16:38	0.05 mi (80 m)	40 yd (37 m)	$0
EF0	A brief tornado touched down in a suburban area, causing no noticeable damage.							
EF2	Southern Sedalia	Pettis	MO	38.6619°N 93.2200°W	17:22–17:28	2.11 mi (3.40 km)	500 yd (460 m)	$4,000,000
EF2	A strong tornado moved through the south side of Sedalia, heavily damaging or destroying numerous homes and businesses. 70 mobile homes were damaged or destroyed in two separate mobile home parks, and numerous trees and power poles were snapped. Several tanker trucks and semi-trucks were flipped and damaged, along with several school buses stored in a bus barn. Twenty people sustained mostly minor injuries.							
EF0	Western Liberty	Clay	MO	39.2511°N 94.4442°W	17:33	0.05 mi (80 m)	40 yd (37 m)	$0
EF0	A brief tornado caused no damage.							
EF0	W of Kearney	Clay	MO	39.3742°N 94.3864°W	17:45	0.05 mi (80 m)	40 yd (37 m)	$0
EF0	A brief tornado caused no damage.							
EF0	NE of Beaman	Pettis	MO	38.7678°N 93.1172°W	17:52	0.05 mi (80 m)	40 yd (37 m)	$0
EF0	A brief tornado caused no damage.							
EF0	NW of Pleasant Green	Cooper	MO	38.8369°N 93.0356°W	18:04	0.05 mi (80 m)	40 yd (37 m)	$0
EF0	A brief tornado caused no damage.							
EF0	SW of Higginsville	Lafayette	MO	39.0536°N 93.7375°W	18:07	0.05 mi (80 m)	40 yd (37 m)	$0
EF0	A brief tornado caused no damage.							
EF1	NW of New Florence to NW of Bellflower	Montgomery	MO	38.9430°N 91.4702°W	19:15–19:22	7.08 mi (11.39 km)	100 yd (91 m)	Unknown
EF1	Several farmsteads were struck by a high-end EF1 tornado, with multiple outbuildings, grain bins, and machine sheds being damaged or destroyed. Metal roofing from a couple locations was thrown up to a half mile away and, in one instance, wrapped around high tension power lines. Extensive tree damage occurred along the path.							
EF0	Northwestern Van Wert	Van Wert	OH	40.8801°N 84.5976°W	19:26–19:27	0.15 mi (240 m)	40 yd (37 m)	$0
EF0	A brief tornado downed a few power poles on the northwest side of town.							
EF1	N of Myrtle	Oregon	MO	36.5709°N 91.2428°W	19:56–20:05	2.5 mi (4.0 km)	100 yd (91 m)	$20,000
EF1	Several trees were snapped or uprooted, and three outbuildings sustained minor roof damage.							
EF3	SW of Grandin to Ellsinore to NW of Buckhorn	Carter, Wayne, Madison	MO	36.8147°N 90.8492°W	20:49–21:46	47.41 mi (76.30 km)	1,200 yd (1,100 m)	$800,000
EF3	See section on this tornado – 2 people were injured.							
EF1	ENE of Oil Trough	Independence, Jackson	AR	35.620°N 91.410°W	21:13–21:20	5.49 mi (8.84 km)	500 yd (460 m)	$40,000
EF1	Many trees and power poles were knocked down, and several homes sustained roof damage.							
EF1	Southwest Greensburg	Decatur	IN	39.3274°N 85.5213°W	21:15–21:18	0.83 mi (1.34 km)	600 yd (550 m)	$500,000
EF1	A tornado struck the southwestern portion of Greensburg, beginning at the Greensburg Municipal Airport, where hangars sustained roof and garage door damage and a small plane was thrown 50 feet (15 m). It then impacted the adjacent Greensburg Country Club, where numerous large oak trees were uprooted, one of which destroyed a picnic shelter. Thirty homes were damaged in a nearby neighborhood, some heavily; damage mainly consisted of roof, siding, gutters, and garage doors. More trees were downed, and a few outbuildings were destroyed. Other nearby homes sustained significant hail damage.							
EF1	Northwest Greensburg	Decatur	IN	39.3532°N 85.5090°W	21:20–21:22	0.15 mi (240 m)	400 yd (370 m)	$250,000
EF1	A second brief tornado struck the northwestern part of Greensburg in the area of Interstate 74 and U.S. Highway 421. Approximately 15 to 20 homes sustained roof and siding damage, with several garage doors buckling and blowing inwards and debris being scattered into a farm field. Plywood was found impaled into the stucco wall of a bank building.							
EF1	SW of Fredericktown to E of Junction City	Madison	MO	37.5386°N 90.3187°W	21:35–21:41	5.49 mi (8.84 km)	40 yd (37 m)	Unknown
EF1	The tornado began just southwest of Fredericktown, with trees and tree limbs blown down. As it moved northeast, extensive tree damage occurred in the southeastern part of town, two machine sheds were severely damaged, and a two-vehicle garage was destroyed, along with a vehicle inside. A tennis court and a baseball field were damaged, a house sustained major roof damage, and a second home was damaged by falling tree limbs. Just east of town, several 300-pound (140 kg) styrofoam blocks were blown up to 80 yards (73 m) away from a distribution company.							
EF1	Mill Spring to W of Lodi	Wayne	MO	37.0555°N 90.7000°W	21:37–22:04	17.77 mi (28.60 km)	150 yd (140 m)	$70,000
EF1	An intermittent tornado destroyed two outbuildings and a small private covered bridge and caused minor damage to a house. Numerous trees were snapped or uprooted, and a few power poles were snapped.							
EF0	W of Hunter	Carter	MO	36.8846°N 90.9057°W	21:44–21:45	0.49 mi (0.79 km)	50 yd (46 m)	$2,000
EF0	A few trees and tree limbs were downed.							
EF1	W of Burlington	Des Moines	IA	40.7743°N 91.2255°W	21:45–22:00	4.83 mi (7.77 km)	100 yd (91 m)	$250,000
EF1	Two railroad box cars were overturned, a shed was destroyed, trees and power poles were snapped, and smaller tree limbs were broken. Much of the track was on the grounds of the Iowa Army Ammunition Plant.							
EF1	SSW of Zion	Madison	MO	37.3491°N 90.3785°W	21:46–21:51	5.25 mi (8.45 km)	440 yd (400 m)	$0
EF1	Numerous trees were snapped and uprooted from U.S. Highway 67 to the northeast, south of Zion. This tornado occurred simultaneously with and paralleled the path of the following tornado.							
EF1	SSW of Zion	Madison	MO	37.3583°N 90.3792°W	21:47–21:51	4.35 mi (7.00 km)	580 yd (530 m)	$0
EF1	Numerous trees were snapped and uprooted near U.S. Highway 67, south of Zion. This tornado occurred simultaneously with and paralleled the path of the previous tornado.							
EF0	SW of Silver Lake	Perry	MO	37.6376°N 90.0967°W	21:51–21:52	0.3 mi (0.48 km)	60 yd (55 m)	$3,000
EF0	Several trees and tree limbs were downed.							
EF0	W of Torch	Ripley	MO	36.5304°N 90.7094°W	21:58–21:59	0.74 mi (1.19 km)	50 yd (46 m)	$0
EF0	A brief tornado caused no damage.							
EF1	S of Dodgeville to W of Sperry	Des Moines	IA	40.9058°N 91.1814°W	22:00–22:15	3.57 mi (5.75 km)	50 yd (46 m)	$50,000
EF1	A tornado moved northward from south of Dodgeville to just north of town. A small barn and an outbuilding were destroyed, and trees were snapped.							
EF1	Monroeville to SE of Norwalk	Huron	OH	41.2343°N 82.6909°W	22:00–22:15	7.96 mi (12.81 km)	50 yd (46 m)	$250,000
EF1	Several homes and businesses were damaged, a few of which lost large sections of roofing, and a large barn was leveled. Dozens of trees were downed, some of which landed on structures.							
EF0	W of Dunkirk	Hardin	OH	40.7845°N 83.6630°W	22:14–22:15	0.2 mi (320 m)	25 yd (23 m)	$0
EF0	A brief tornado touched down in an open field, causing no damage.							
EF0	W of Poplar Bluff	Butler	MO	36.750°N 90.440°W	22:14–22:15	0.7 mi (1.1 km)	40 yd (37 m)	$0
EF0	A brief tornado caused no damage just west of Poplar Bluff.							
EF1	S of Marquand to SW of Alliance	Madison, Bollinger	MO	37.4094°N 90.1676°W	22:26–22:33	13.03 mi (20.97 km)	250 yd (230 m)	$30,000
EF1	Hundreds of trees were snapped or uprooted.							
EF0	E of Heyworth	McLean	IL	40.3110°N 88.8986°W	23:06–23:07	0.9 mi (1.4 km)	25 yd (23 m)	$8,000
EF0	A grain bin was damaged.							
EF1	SE of Downs to SE of Merna	McLean	IL	40.3601°N 88.8209°W	23:09–23:20	10.3 mi (16.6 km)	75 yd (69 m)	$10,000
EF1	A semi-truck was overturned on Interstate 74. The tornado then moved northward through open fields before dissipating.							
EF0	Northeast Centerville	Montgomery	OH	39.6546°N 84.1160°W	23:10–23:11	0.09 mi (140 m)	25 yd (23 m)	$5,000
EF0	A brief tornado downed a few trees on the grounds of the south campus of the Miami Valley Hospital.							
EF1	NNW of Neely's Landing	Cape Girardeau	MO	37.5328°N 89.5413°W	23:18–23:22	2.13 mi (3.43 km)	250 yd (230 m)	$20,000
EF1	One home sustained roof damage, a barn had tin roofing peeled back, and many trees were snapped or uprooted.							
EF0	WNW of Greasy Corner	Saint Francis	AR	35.0118°N 90.4947°W	23:18–23:19	1.05 mi (1.69 km)	100 yd (91 m)	$0
EF0	A weak tornado over open country caused no damage.							
EF2	NW of Woodlawn to NE of Dix	Jefferson	IL	38.3605°N 89.1238°W	23:28–23:44	13.48 mi (21.69 km)	250 yd (230 m)	$4,000,000
EF2	A strong tornado struck the small community of Boyd, where a church sustained roof damage and a sawmill was destroyed. Along the entire path, 101 homes were damaged, 23 of which were left uninhabitable; most sustained roof and siding loss. A popup camper and a small shed were thrown 50 to 75 feet (15 to 23 m) from where they originated, and numerous trees and power poles were snapped.							
EF0	SE of Benton	Scott	MO	37.080°N 89.540°W	23:30–23:31	0.36 mi (580 m)	50 yd (46 m)	$1,000
EF0	A few trees and tree limbs were downed along Interstate 55.							
EF0	SE of Fairlawn to Cuyahoga Falls	Summit	OH	41.1047°N 81.5525°W	23:30–23:40	4.18 mi (6.73 km)	50 yd (46 m)	$200,000
EF0	An intermittent tornado began southeast of Fairlawn in the Akron city limits and tracked into Cuyahoga Falls. A church near Fairlawn lost its roof, several buildings in downtown Cuyahoga Falls sustained roof damage, and numerous trees were snapped and uprooted along the path.							
EF1	NNE of Anna	Union	IL	37.4834°N 89.2430°W	23:39–23:42	2 mi (3.2 km)	125 yd (114 m)	$150,000
EF1	A couple of homes sustained minor roof damage, and numerous trees were snapped or uprooted, one of which destroyed a vehicle.							
EF1	SW of Mound City to ENE of Mounds	Pulaski	IL	37.0749°N 89.1764°W	23:40–23:47	5.5 mi (8.9 km)	250 yd (230 m)	$50,000
EF1	The tornado moved along the banks of the Ohio River, passing through Mound City before dissipating to the northeast. A small mobile home was thrown into a power pole, several homes sustained roof damage, and many trees were snapped or uprooted.							
EF1	ESE of Pulaski to NW of New Grand Chain	Pulaski	IL	37.2047°N 89.1807°W	23:45–23:58	10.04 mi (16.16 km)	120 yd (110 m)	$40,000
EF1	A small shed was damaged, several businesses near Pulaski sustained roof damage, and several trees were snapped or uprooted.							
EF1	West Memphis	Crittenden	AR	35.1394°N 90.1807°W	23:48–23:51	2.52 mi (4.06 km)	100 yd (91 m)	$500,000
EF1	A large storage building and a mobile home sustained major damage, while another mobile home was damaged by a falling tree. Several tree limbs and a power pole were downed as well.							
EF2	SE of New Grand Chain to NE of Grantsburg	Pulaski, Massac, Johnson	IL	37.220°N 88.990°W	23:55–00:14	19.87 mi (31.98 km)	325 yd (297 m)	$255,000
EF2	The tornado began along the Ohio River and moved northeast. Near New Grand Chain, trees were downed, and several recreational vehicles were damaged or overturned at a campground. In Massac County, the tornado moved north of Mermet Lake. Here, a house was damaged, with the back porch ripped off and roofing and siding removed, and a barn was destroyed, with debris scattered hundreds of yards away. In addition, an irrigation pivot was overturned, a few small outbuildings and two grain bins were destroyed (with one bin thrown 265 yards (242 m)), and four other homes were damaged by falling trees. Crossing into Johnson County near Interstate 24, the tornado destroyed a barn and then caused significant tree damage near Ganntown, where a home also sustained minor roof damage. Near Grantsburg, a pole barn was destroyed, and swirl marks were left in grass fields. Over 100 trees were downed in the Shawnee National Forest before the tornado dissipated just before reaching the Pope County line.							
EF0	SE of Mahomet	Champaign	IL	40.1676°N 88.3339°W	23:58–23:59	0.2 mi (320 m)	15 yd (14 m)	$5,000
EF0	A brief tornado damaged a few trees.							
EF3	SSE of Erie to SE of Zelma	Lawrence	IN	38.8597°N 86.3642°W	23:58–00:11	6.75 mi (10.86 km)	300 yd (270 m)	$150,000
EF3	An intense tornado caused major damage east of Bedford, where numerous homes, mobile homes, and outbuildings were either damaged or destroyed. Multiple vehicles were tossed or flipped, and many trees were snapped as well. The tornado dissipated near the Jackson County line.							
EF1	E of Artois to SE of Chico	Glenn, Butte	CA	39.6200°N 122.1624°W	00:08–01:46	21.65 mi (34.84 km)	120 yd (110 m)	$200,000
EF1	A slow-moving long-tracked tornado caused significant damage to two almond groves, with hundreds of almond trees uprooted and large limbs broken off others. Roofs and farm implements sustained minor damage.							
EF1	Willows to E of Durham	Glenn, Butte	CA	39.520°N 122.200°W	00:12–01:32	26.37 mi (42.44 km)	120 yd (110 m)	$550,000
EF1	A second slow-moving long-tracked tornado moved parallel and to the south of the previous tornado. Significant damage took place at an almond grove where thousands of trees were uprooted. In a few instances, large trees were carried 5 to 10 feet (1.5 to 3.0 m) from where they initially stood. Additionally, an outbuilding was destroyed, a barn was damaged, and two other structures sustained roof damage.							
EF1	Clay City	Clay	IL	38.6764°N 88.3688°W	00:18–00:19	1 mi (1.6 km)	75 yd (69 m)	$510,000
EF1	A barn and several garages were damaged, 15 homes sustained minor to moderate roof damage, a concrete block storage building collapsed, and numerous trees were downed.							
EF0	NW of Olney	Richland	IL	38.7447°N 88.1310°W	00:35–00:36	0.2 mi (320 m)	10 yd (9.1 m)	$0
EF0	A brief tornado in an open field caused no damage.							
EF2	S of Robinson to W of Palestine	Crawford	IL	38.9618°N 87.7422°W	00:57–01:03	5.5 mi (8.9 km)	200 yd (180 m)	$920,000
EF2	Fourteen houses were damaged, three of which lost most of their roofs and a fourth which was pushed off of its foundation. Outbuildings and garages were destroyed, a large camper was rolled, and numerous trees and power poles were downed as well.							
EF0	ESE of Farmerville	Union	LA	32.7550°N 92.3901°W	00:58–01:10	5.53 mi (8.90 km)	150 yd (140 m)	$0
EF0	This tornado began south of Farmerville over Lake D'Arbonne and moved eastward along Highway 2. Several trees were downed, and tree limbs were snapped.							
EF2	N of St. Wendel to NE Haubstadt	Posey, Vanderburgh, Gibson	IN	38.1387°N 87.6755°W	01:09–01:25	12.17 mi (19.59 km)	125 yd (114 m)	$240,000
EF2	Southeast of Cynthiana, trees and power lines were downed, a machine shed was damaged, and several structures were destroyed at a small airfield near Nisbet. North of Interstate 64 in Gibson County, a house was severely damaged, four barns were destroyed, and five power poles were snapped in the Haubstadt area before the tornado dissipated.							
EF0	NW of Kirksey	Calloway	KY	36.7287°N 88.4096°W	01:19–01:20	0.27 mi (430 m)	80 yd (73 m)	$10,000
EF0	Several dozen trees were either snapped or uprooted.							
EF1	Marion Heights	Vigo	IN	39.4944°N 87.4483°W	01:20–01:21	0.39 mi (0.63 km)	100 yd (91 m)	Unknown
EF1	Homes sustained roof and window damage, sheds and garages were destroyed, and numerous trees were snapped and uprooted.							
EF1	Farmerville	Union	LA	32.782°N 92.448°W	01:20–01:28	6.23 mi (10.03 km)	400 yd (370 m)	$500,000
EF1	This tornado began west of Farmerville along Lake D'Arbonne and moved through the northern part of town. Numerous trees and several power lines were downed, with several houses damaged mostly by falling trees. Much of the town remained without electricity for over 24 hours following the tornado.							
EF2	ESE of Oakland City	Pike	IN	38.310°N 87.260°W	01:35–01:37	1.64 mi (2.64 km)	200 yd (180 m)	$0
EF2	Thousands of large trees were snapped or uprooted in a rural area. This tornado occurred simultaneously with the 01:36 UTC tornado in Pike County.							
EF1	SE of Oakland City to SE of Winslow	Pike	IN	38.3072°N 87.2500°W	01:36–01:42	4.97 mi (8.00 km)	50 yd (46 m)	$20,000
EF1	Several dozen trees were snapped or uprooted. This tornado occurred simultaneously with the 01:35 and 01:39 UTC tornadoes in Pike County.							
EF2	NNE of Portland	Ashley	AR	33.2662°N 91.5200°W	01:37–01:43	6.25 mi (10.06 km)	352 yd (322 m)	$100,000
EF2	Several homes sustained roof damage, a carport was destroyed, and tin roofing was torn from outbuildings. Ten power poles were snapped, multiple trees were snapped or uprooted, and several irrigation pivots were overturned.							
EF0	Bridgeton	Parke	IN	39.6498°N 87.1772°W	01:38–01:39	0.35 mi (560 m)	30 yd (27 m)	Unknown
EF0	A brief tornado caused minor damage.							
EF1	SSE of Winslow	Pike	IN	38.3221°N 87.2200°W	01:39–01:44	3.19 mi (5.13 km)	60 yd (55 m)	$20,000
EF1	Several dozen trees were snapped or uprooted. This tornado occurred simultaneously with the 01:36 UTC tornado in Pike County.							
EF1	ESE of Rockville	Parke	IN	39.7467°N 87.1431°W	01:40–01:43	0.78 mi (1.26 km)	100 yd (91 m)	Unknown
EF1	A brief tornado caused minor damage.							
EF2	NW of Oroville	Butte	CA	39.5980°N 121.6208°W	01:45–01:48	0.21 mi (340 m)	10 yd (9.1 m)	$120,000
EF2	This tornado caused major damage at a ranch, where a large, well-built garage was destroyed and a barn was severely damaged.							
EF2	Huntingburg	Dubois	IN	38.2990°N 86.9336°W	01:50–01:52	1.93 mi (3.11 km)	100 yd (91 m)	$100,000
EF2	This tornado struck the southern and eastern sides of Huntingburg. Several mobile homes were badly damaged in a mobile home park, two of which were completely destroyed. Multiple permanent homes and garages in the area sustained roof damage, along with several businesses. A few garages were destroyed, one of which was of cinder block construction, and numerous trees were snapped and uprooted along the path.							
EF1	Haysville	Dubois	IN	38.4824°N 86.9452°W	01:54–01:55	1.87 mi (3.01 km)	60 yd (55 m)	$30,000
EF1	A modular home lost its roof, a shed was destroyed, many trees were snapped or uprooted, and power lines were downed.							
EF1	WSW of Bloomington	Monroe	IN	39.1251°N 86.6112°W	02:14–02:16	0.99 mi (1.59 km)	150 yd (140 m)	$200,000
EF1	A brief tornado embedded in larger field of straight-line wind damage destroyed several mobile homes in a mobile home park.							
EF0	ESE of Murray	Calloway	KY	36.5903°N 88.1422°W	02:17–02:18	0.39 mi (0.63 km)	50 yd (46 m)	$50,000
EF0	Several trees and treetops were snapped, one of which crushed a car. A power line was downed, and several homes and garages sustained minor damage.							
EF2	SSW of Orleans to SW of Leipsic	Orange	IN	38.6328°N 86.4597°W	02:22–02:27	4.3 mi (6.9 km)	230 yd (210 m)	$150,000
EF2	A wood frame home and two brick homes sustained major damage, along with several barns and outbuildings that were either heavily damaged or destroyed. A tractor stored in one of the barns was overturned, numerous trees were snapped or uprooted, and power poles were downed.							
EF1	NW of Saltillo	Orange, Lawrence, Washington	IN	38.6328°N 86.4597°W	02:28–02:31	3.22 mi (5.18 km)	100 yd (91 m)	$35,000
EF1	A large barn was destroyed, a house sustained minor damage, and numerous trees were snapped or uprooted.							
EF1	NW of Mount Carmel	Washington	IN	38.7118°N 86.3088°W	02:31–02:33	2.4 mi (3.9 km)	130 yd (120 m)	$30,000
EF1	A metal outbuilding was heavily damaged, numerous trees were snapped or uprooted, and several power lines were downed.							
EF0	N of Morristown	Shelby	IN	39.6909°N 85.7041°W	03:15–03:17	0.69 mi (1.11 km)	150 yd (140 m)	$75,000
EF0	Two homes were damaged, and numerous trees were snapped or uprooted. One person was injured when a tree fell on his car.							
EF0	NNE of Natchez	Natchitoches	LA	31.689°N 93.032°W	03:22–03:26	1.39 mi (2.24 km)	50 yd (46 m)	$0
EF0	Several trees were downed, and tree limbs were snapped.							
EF2	E of Littleville	Colbert, Lawrence	AL	34.5929°N 87.5486°W	04:17–04:21	2.17 mi (3.49 km)	100 yd (91 m)	Unknown
EF2	A chicken house was completely destroyed, with roofing tossed 100 yards (91 m) away. A house lost most of its roof, its adjoining carport was damaged, and a church sustained roof damage. Numerous large trees were snapped or uprooted along the path.							
EF1	SW of Springfield	Lauderdale	AL	34.8808°N 87.4160°W	04:30–04:35	1.89 mi (3.04 km)	100 yd (91 m)	Unknown
EF1	A small barn was nearly destroyed, and several large pine trees were snapped and uprooted, one of which fell on a home, causing major damage.							
EF1	Liberty Township	Butler	OH	39.380°N 84.410°W	04:30–04:33	2.54 mi (4.09 km)	100 yd (91 m)	$175,000
EF1	A high-end EF1 tornado removed the roof and second story exterior walls from a house, caused significant roof damage to three homes, and caused minor roof and siding damage to several other homes. Several vehicles were damaged, including one that was flipped, and numerous trees and power poles were snapped.							
EF0	ESE of Rogersville	Limestone	AL	34.7803°N 87.1783°W	04:40–04:44	1.27 mi (2.04 km)	25 yd (23 m)	Unknown
EF0	Several pine trees were knocked down, one of which landed on a house, and a small shed was damaged.							
EF0	NW of Athens	Limestone	AL	34.8454°N 87.0380°W	04:49–04:54	3.84 mi (6.18 km)	50 yd (46 m)	Unknown
EF0	This tornado originated from the same circulation as the previous tornado. A large barn was severely damaged, with roof and wall removal, and many trees were downed, one of which fell into the side of a house.							
EF0	S of Cleveland	Liberty	TX	30.300°N 95.090°W	04:49	0.5 mi (0.80 km)	20 yd (18 m)	$0
EF0	Brief tornado over open country with no damage.							
EF0	SSE of Athens	Limestone	AL	34.7596°N 86.9534°W	04:55–04:58	0.78 mi (1.26 km)	50 yd (46 m)	$0
EF0	The tornado touched down on a golf course and either snapped or uprooted several trees.							

=== May 26 event ===
List of confirmed tornadoes – Thursday, May 26, 2011
EF#	Location	County / Parish	State	Start Coord.	Time (UTC)	Path length	Max width	Damage
EF0	SSE of Ardmore	Limestone, Madison	AL	34.9170°N 86.8502°W	05:00–05:06	4.58 mi (7.37 km)	50 yd (46 m)	$0
EF0	Numerous trees were downed with this tornado that originated from the same circulation as the previous tornadoes in Limestone County prior to midnight.							
EF0	Kenefick	Liberty	TX	30.11°N 94.85°W	05:15	0.5 mi (0.80 km)	20 yd (18 m)	$5,000
EF0	A few trees were downed, which blocked a couple roads.							
EF0	NW of Meridianville to E of Hazel Green	Madison	AL	34.8763°N 86.5956°W	05:17–05:27	7.38 mi (11.88 km)	50 yd (46 m)	Unknown
EF0	A few homes sustained minor roof and siding damage, and numerous trees were downed.							
EF0	W of Bloomingburg	Fayette	OH	39.6099°N 83.4475°W	05:25–05:26	0.46 mi (0.74 km)	75 yd (69 m)	$35,000
EF0	A barn was destroyed, and two others were damaged.							
EF0	E of Yatesville	Fayette	OH	39.6842°N 83.4178°W	05:26–05:27	0.99 mi (1.59 km)	75 yd (69 m)	$50,000
EF0	Two barns were heavily damaged and a large tree was downed.							
EF1	Smithville	DeKalb	TN	35.9505°N 85.8159°W	05:58–06:00	2.35 mi (3.78 km)	50 yd (46 m)	$1,000,000
EF1	A gas station building was severely damaged, with roof removal and wall collapse, although the awning remained intact. A restaurant was damaged, and an adjacent strip mall and Smithville Elementary School sustained roof damage. A large HVAC unit was slid across the roof of the school as well. Several homes were damaged, and many trees were downed as well. This tornado was originally rated EF0 but was upgraded to high-end EF1 following a 2021 reanalysis.							
EF0	NW of Helena	Jackson	MS	30.5203°N 88.5481°W	20:23–20:30	2.9 mi (4.7 km)	50 yd (46 m)	$20,000
EF0	The tornado began in the Coll Town area and moved northeast. A portable office trailer was overturned, and trees and power lines were downed.							
EF0	W of Pierpont	Ashtabula	OH	41.7483°N 80.5964°W	20:35–20:37	1.2 mi (1.9 km)	100 yd (91 m)	$200,000
EF0	Many trees were downed and ten homes and buildings sustained roof and siding damage.							
EF1	W of Springboro	Crawford	PA	41.7855°N 80.5008°W	20:40–20:51	6.6 mi (10.6 km)	100 yd (91 m)	$150,000
EF1	Around ten structures sustained roof and siding damage, and numerous trees were downed along the path.							
EF3	W of Bush	St. Tammany	LA	30.6156°N 90.0491°W	21:40–21:55	6.06 mi (9.75 km)	150 yd (140 m)	$400,000
EF3	Two houses sustained total roof loss and exterior wall collapse, and several others sustained lesser degrees of damage. Ten to fifteen mobile homes were either damaged or destroyed as well. Many trees were downed along the path. Four people were injured.							
EF1	New Franklin	Franklin	PA	39.8821°N 77.6346°W	22:10–22:11	0.12 mi (0.19 km)	25 yd (23 m)	$10,000
EF1	Dozens of pine trees were snapped.							
EF1	SW of Milan	Bradford	PA	41.8922°N 76.5270°W	23:00–23:32	0.39 mi (630 m)	75 yd (69 m)	$20,000
EF1	Numerous trees were downed, and a trailer was damaged.							
EF1	NE of Hogestown	Cumberland	PA	40.2545°N 77.0360°W	23:10–23:14	2.64 mi (4.25 km)	100 yd (91 m)	$15,000
EF1	Roughly 100 trees were downed, a few homes sustained minor damage, and a small outbuilding sustained severe damage.							
EF1	W of Marysville to E of Dauphin	Perry, Dauphin	PA	40.3427°N 76.9519°W	23:20–23:24	2.62 mi (4.22 km)	100 yd (91 m)	$150,000
EF1	Roughly 100 trees were downed in Perry County before the tornado crossed the Susquehanna River into Dauphin County, where it caused moderate to major damage to six homes and downed about 150 more trees.							
EF1	SW of Slate Run to Cedar Run	Lycoming	PA	41.4523°N 77.5125°W	23:25–23:32	5.57 mi (8.96 km)	150 yd (140 m)	$8,000
EF1	About 400 trees were downed, with a few homes being damaged by fallen trees.							
EF1	N of Cammal	Lycoming	PA	41.4059°N 77.4655°W	23:26–23:29	2 mi (3.2 km)	100 yd (91 m)	$6,000
EF1	About 200 trees were downed and a few homes were damaged by fallen trees.							
EF0	SE of New Weston	Mercer	OH	40.3276°N 84.6200°W	23:38–23:39	0.07 mi (110 m)	10 yd (9.1 m)	$0
EF0	Brief tornado over open country caused no damage.							
EF0	SSE of Gettysburg	Darke	OH	40.1070°N 84.4930°W	00:05–00:06	0.12 mi (190 m)	10 yd (9.1 m)	$0
EF0	Brief tornado with no damage.							
EF1	W of Schuylkill Haven to ENE of New Ringgold	Schuylkill	PA	40.6250°N 76.2108°W	00:20–00:45	17 mi (27 km)	200 yd (180 m)	$250,000
EF1	Approximately 20 homes were damaged, four of which sustained major damage. Twelve barns and outbuildings were damaged, and roughly 1,000 trees were downed.							
EF0	NW of Clover	York	SC	35.1390°N 81.2760°W	01:52–01:54	0.76 mi (1.22 km)	100 yd (91 m)	Unknown
EF0	A house sustained minor damage, and several trees were downed, one of which fell on a recreational vehicle.							

== See also ==
- List of United States tornadoes in May 2011
- List of tornadoes in the 2011 Super Outbreak
