= Lone Tree Wildlife Management Area =

Park in Nobles County, Minnesota, United States

Lone Tree State Wildlife Management Area
- IUCN category IV (habitat/species management area)
- Location within Minnesota Location within the United States
- Location: Seward Township, Nobles County, Minnesota
- Nearest city: Fulda
- Coordinates: 43°48′40″N 95°37′26″W
- Area: 482.49 acres (195.26 ha)
- Governing body: Minnesota Department of Natural Resources

Lone Tree Wildlife Management Area is a wildlife management area in Seward Township, Nobles County, Minnesota. The nearest town is Fulda. Its area is 482.49 acres (195.26 ha).
