= Seward Mountains =

Seward Mountains may refer to:

- Seward Mountains (Antarctica)
- Seward Mountains (Alaska)
- Seward Mountain (New York)
- Seward Mountains (New York)
