= Seward Park =

Seward Park may refer to:

- Seward Park (Chicago)
- Seward Park (Manhattan), a park on the Lower East Side of Manhattan, named after William H. Seward
- Seward Park (Seattle), a park in Seattle, Washington
- Seward Park, Seattle, the surrounding neighborhood
