= Seward High School =

Seward High School can refer to:

- Seward High School (Alaska) in Seward, Alaska
- Seward High School (Nebraska) in Seward, Nebraska
