= Seward Township, Nobles County, Minnesota =

Seward Township, Minnesota
- Township
- Location within the state of Minnesota Seward Township, Minnesota (the United States)
- Coordinates: 43°48′44″N 95°37′24″W
- Country: United States
- State: Minnesota
- County: Nobles

Area
  - Total: 35.8 sq mi (92.6 km^{2})
  - Land: 35.6 sq mi (92.3 km^{2})
  - Water: 0.077 sq mi (0.2 km^{2})
- Elevation: 1,549 ft (472 m)

Population (2000)
  - Total: 259
  - Density: 7.3/sq mi (2.8/km^{2})
- Time zone: UTC-6 (Central (CST))
  - Summer (DST): UTC-5 (CDT)
- FIPS code: 27-59260
- GNIS feature ID: 0665578

Seward Township is a township in Nobles County, Minnesota, United States. The population was 259 at the 2000 census.

== Geography ==
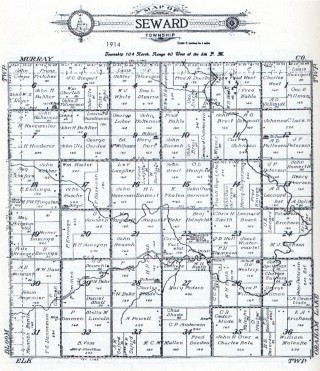
Map of Seward Township - 1914

Secretary of State William H. Seward

According to the United States Census Bureau, the township has a total area of 35.7 square miles (92.6 km^{2}), of which 35.7 square miles (92.3 km^{2}) is land and 0.1 square mile (0.2 km^{2}) (0.25%) is water. Jack Creek and the south fork of Jack Creek are like a spider web on the map of Seward Township. The creek touches no fewer than twenty of the thirty-six sections of land within the township. Lone Tree Wildlife Management Area is within the township.

Main highways include:

- U.S. Highway 59
- Nobles County Road 7
- Nobles County Road 16
- Nobles County Road 18

== History ==
Organization of Seward Township was approved by the Nobles County Board on September 28, 1872. The first township meeting was held on October 30, 1872, and the name Seward Township was selected at this first meeting in honor of U.S. Secretary of State William H. Seward who died just twenty days earlier on October 10, 1872. Seward was popular among Civil War veterans, many of whom settled in this township. William Seward is generally known today for his purchase of Alaska - "Seward's Folly" - in 1867.

== Demographics ==
As of the census of 2000, there were 259 people, 89 households, and 73 families residing in the township. The population density was 7.3 people per square mile (2.8/km^{2}). There were 92 housing units at an average density of 2.6/sq mi (1.0/km^{2}). The racial makeup of the township was 98.84% White, 1.16% from other races. Hispanic or Latino of any race were 1.16% of the population.

There were 89 households, out of which 39.3% had children under the age of 18 living with them, 78.7% were married couples living together, 3.4% had a female householder with no husband present, and 16.9% were non-families. 14.6% of all households were made up of individuals, and 3.4% had someone living alone who was 65 years of age or older. The average household size was 2.91 and the average family size was 3.27.

In the township the population was spread out, with 29.3% under the age of 18, 5.8% from 18 to 24, 27.4% from 25 to 44, 22.4% from 45 to 64, and 15.1% who were 65 years of age or older. The median age was 41 years. For every 100 females, there were 115.8 males. For every 100 females age 18 and over, there were 117.9 males.

The median income for a household in the township was $36,607, and the median income for a family was $42,500. Males had a median income of $28,295 versus $17,813 for females. The per capita income for the township was $19,348. About 8.1% of families and 9.4% of the population were below the poverty line, including 5.7% of those under the age of eighteen and none of those 65 or over.

== Politics ==
Seward Township is located in Minnesota's 1st congressional district, represented by Mankato educator Tim Walz, a Democrat. At the state level, Seward Township is located in Senate District 22, represented by Republican Doug Magnus, and in House District 22A, represented by Republican Joe Schomacker.

== Local politics ==
Seward Township is represented by Nobles County Commissioner Diane Thier.
