= Barclay, Kansas =

Unincorporated community in Kansas, U.S.

Coordinates: 38°34′38″N 95°52′49″W

Barclay is an unincorporated community in Osage County, Kansas, United States.

== History ==
Barclay was a station on the Atchison, Topeka and Santa Fe Railway.

A post office was opened in Barclay in 1873, and remained in operation until it was discontinued in 1955.

== Climate ==
The climate in this area is characterized by hot, humid summers and generally mild to cool winters. According to the Köppen Climate Classification system, Barclay has a humid subtropical climate, abbreviated "Cfa" on climate maps.
