= Iowa Point, Kansas =

Unincorporated community in Doniphan County, Kansas

- Unincorporated community
- A plat of Iowa Point

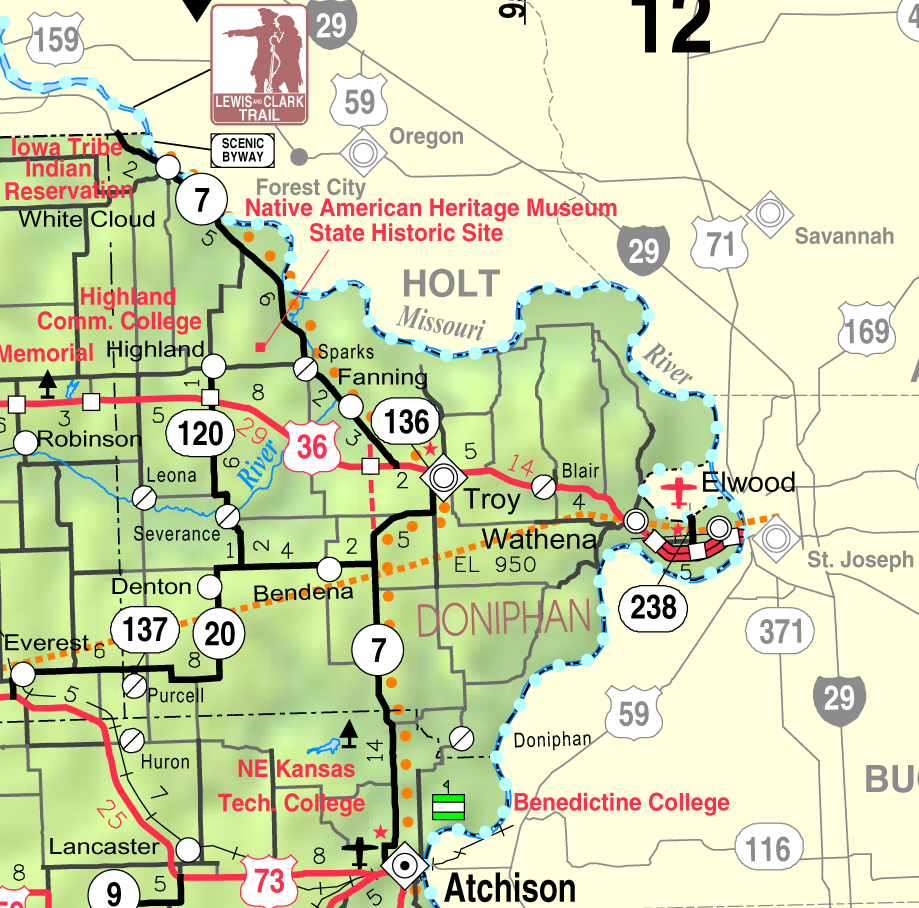
- KDOT map of Doniphan County (legend)

- Location within Kansas Location within the United States
- Coordinates: 39°55′42″N 95°14′19″W
- Country: United States
- State: Kansas
- County: Doniphan
- Founded: 1854
- Elevation: 856 ft (261 m)
- Time zone: UTC-6 (CST)
  - Summer (DST): UTC-5 (CDT)
- Area code: 785
- FIPS code: 20-34475
- GNIS ID: 472808

Iowa Point is an unincorporated community in northeastern Doniphan County, Kansas, United States.

== History ==
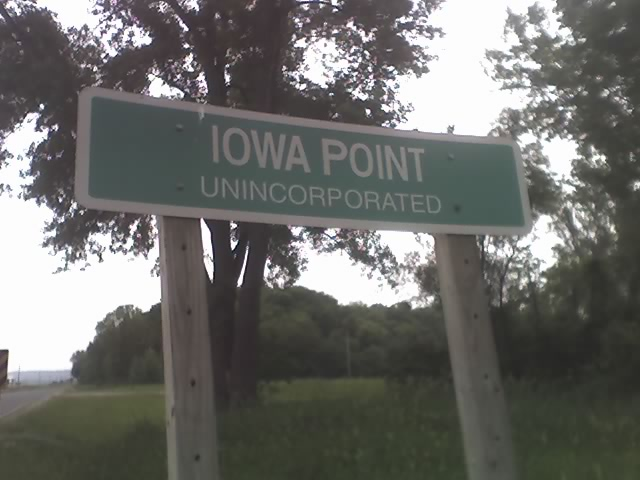
Iowa Point sign located on K-7

Iowa Point was first settled in 1854 on land received from the U.S. Government in payment for missionary services done at the nearby Iowa, Sac and Fox Indian mission. The town was a major shipping point between Leavenworth and Omaha and by 1857, the town had a population estimated at 3,000 making it the second largest town on the Missouri River next to Leavenworth.

The town divided on the issue of slavery; by the end of the Civil War, it had nearly been completely burned, and businesses had nearly been depleted. The town never recovered.

The first post office in Iowa Point opened in 1855, closed temporarily in 1914, reopened that same year, and closed permanently in 1933.

== Demographics ==
The community is included in the St. Joseph, Missouri Metropolitan Area.
