= Seward Township, Winnebago County, Illinois =

Seward Township
- Township
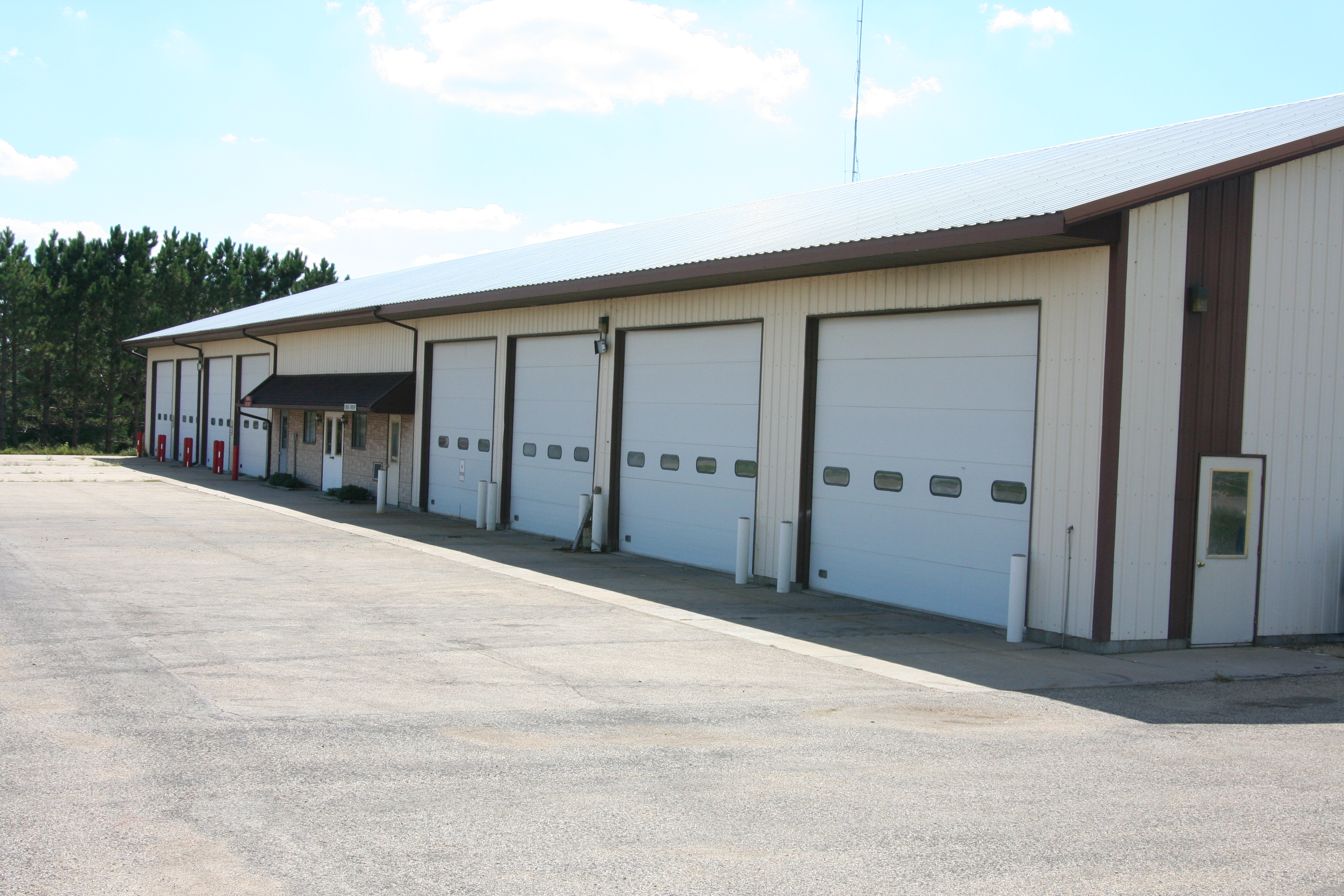
- Combined township building and fire station

- Location in Winnebago County
- Coordinates: 42°14′45″N 89°20′19″W
- Country: United States
- State: Illinois
- County: Winnebago
- Established: November 6, 1849

Government
  - Supervisor: Garelt S. Stahl

Area
  - Total: 35.82 sq mi (92.8 km^{2})
  - Land: 35.81 sq mi (92.7 km^{2})
  - Water: 0 sq mi (0 km^{2}) 0%
- Elevation: 853 ft (260 m)

Population (2010)
  - Estimate (2016): 889
  - Density: 25.6/sq mi (9.9/km^{2})
- Time zone: UTC-6 (CST)
  - Summer (DST): UTC-5 (CDT)
- FIPS code: 17-201-68783

Seward Township is located in Winnebago County, Illinois. As of the 2010 census, its population was 917 and it contained 394 housing units.

== Geography ==
According to the 2010 census, the township has a total area of 35.82 square miles (92.8 km^{2}), all land.

== Demographics ==
Historical population
Census	Pop.	Note	%±
2016 (est.)	889
U.S. Decennial Census
