= Seward, Kansas =

City in Stafford County, Kansas

- City
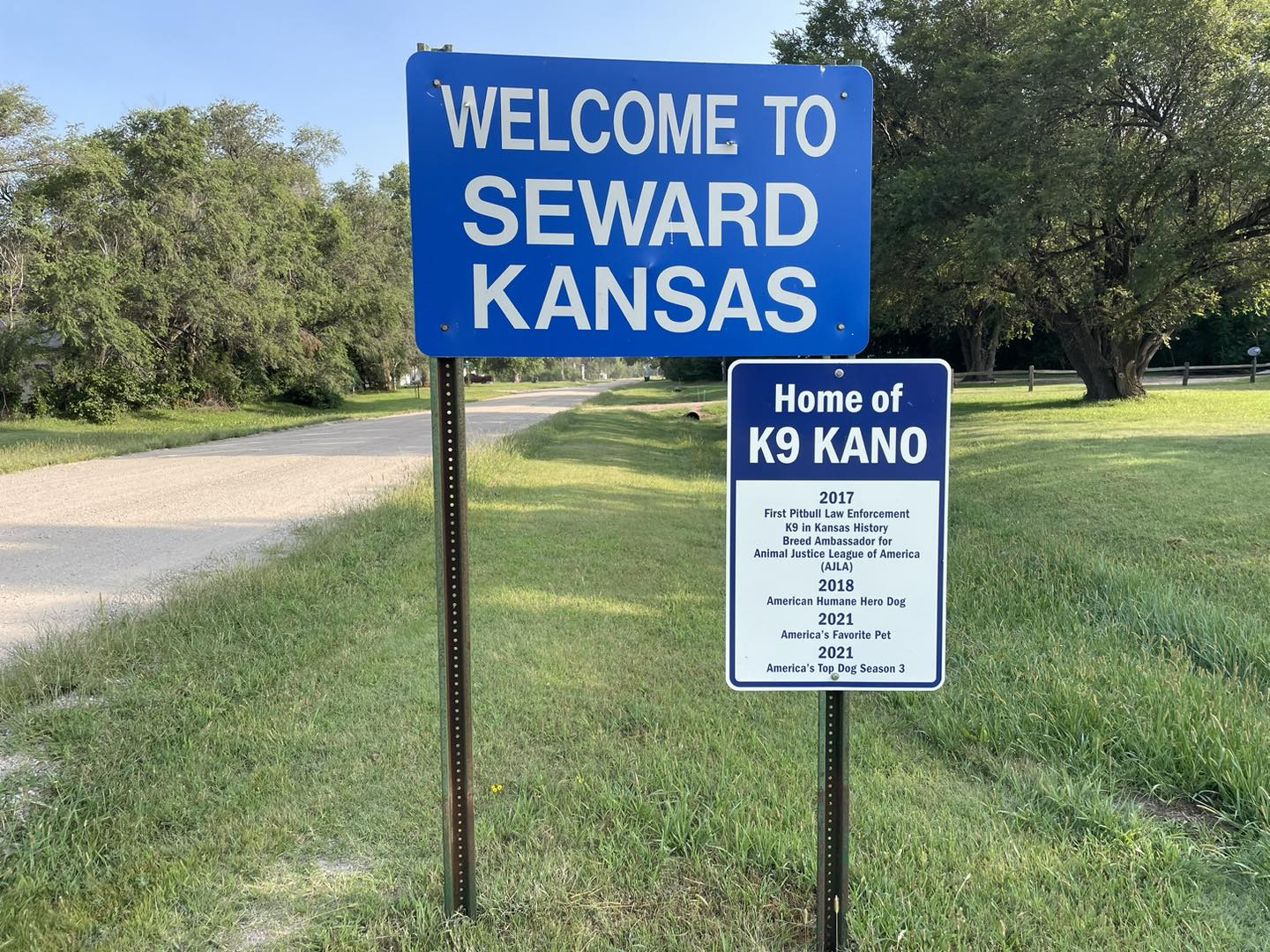
- Seward, Kansas Welcome Sign

- Location within Stafford County and Kansas

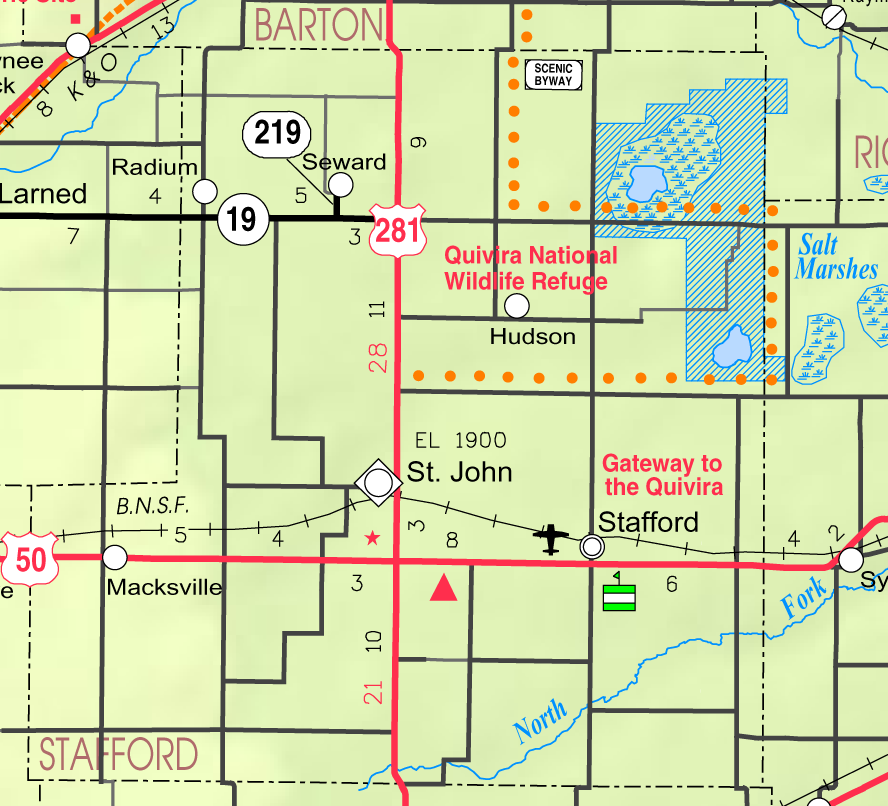
- KDOT map of Stafford County (legend)
- Coordinates: 38°10′40″N 98°47′39″W
- Country: United States
- State: Kansas
- County: Stafford
- Founded: 1870s
- Incorporated: 1927
- Named for: William Seward

Area
  - Total: 0.26 sq mi (0.67 km^{2})
  - Land: 0.26 sq mi (0.67 km^{2})
  - Water: 0 sq mi (0.00 km^{2})
- Elevation: 1,913 ft (583 m)

Population (2020)
  - Total: 41
  - Density: 160/sq mi (61/km^{2})
- Time zone: UTC-6 (CST)
  - Summer (DST): UTC-5 (CDT)
- ZIP Code: 67576
- Area code: 620
- FIPS code: 20-64100
- GNIS ID: 2396579

Seward is a city in Stafford County, Kansas, United States. As of the 2020 census, the population of the city was 41. Located in Seward are a large granary, and a bar and grill as well as numerous homes.

== History ==
Prior to its incorporation in 1927, it was estimated that the population rose to as many as 300 people in the 1910s, during which time it was home to a creamery, post office, bank, hotel, and several lines of business like general and drug stores.

Seward was named for William H. Seward, the 24th United States Secretary of State and the 12th Governor of New York.

A post office was opened in Seward in 1878, and remained in operation until it was discontinued in 1995.

== Geography ==
According to the United States Census Bureau, the city has a total area of 0.25 square miles (0.65 km^{2}), all land.

== Demographics ==
Historical population
Census	Pop.	Note	%±
1930	127		—
1940	125		−1.6%
1950	130		4.0%
1960	92		−29.2%
1970	66		−28.3%
1980	88		33.3%
1990	71		−19.3%
2000	63		−11.3%
2010	64		1.6%
2020	41		−35.9%
U.S. Decennial Census

=== 2010 census ===
As of the census of 2010, there were 64 people, 31 households, and 16 families living in the city. The population density was 256.0 inhabitants per square mile (98.8/km^{2}). There were 37 housing units at an average density of 148.0 per square mile (57.1/km^{2}). The racial makeup of the city was 100.0% White.

There were 31 households, of which 16.1% had children under the age of 18 living with them, 38.7% were married couples living together, 6.5% had a female householder with no husband present, 6.5% had a male householder with no wife present, and 48.4% were non-families. 45.2% of all households were made up of individuals, and 19.4% had someone living alone who was 65 years of age or older. The average household size was 2.06 and the average family size was 3.00.

The median age in the city was 46 years. 23.4% of residents were under the age of 18; 3.2% were between the ages of 18 and 24; 18.9% were from 25 to 44; 31.4% were from 45 to 64; and 23.4% were 65 years of age or older. The gender makeup of the city was 57.8% male and 42.2% female.

=== 2000 census ===
As of the census of 2000, there were 63 people, 34 households, and 17 families living in the city. The population density was 255.7 inhabitants per square mile (98.7/km^{2}). There were 38 housing units at an average density of 154.2 per square mile (59.5/km^{2}). The racial makeup of the city was 96.83% White, and 3.17% from two or more races.

There were 34 households, out of which 26.5% had children under the age of 18 living with them, 44.1% were married couples living together, 5.9% had a female householder with no husband present, and 50.0% were non-families. 44.1% of all households were made up of individuals, and 23.5% had someone living alone who was 65 years of age or older. The average household size was 1.85 and the average family size was 2.59.

In the city, the population was spread out, with 17.5% under the age of 18, 6.3% from 18 to 24, 22.2% from 25 to 44, 31.7% from 45 to 64, and 22.2% who were 65 years of age or older. The median age was 51 years. For every 100 females, there were 110.0 males. For every 100 females age 18 and over, there were 108.0 males.

The median income for a household in the city was $16,250, and the median income for a family was $16,667. Males had a median income of $20,625 versus $16,250 for females. The per capita income for the city was $14,891. None of the population and none of the families were below the poverty line.

== Education ==
The community is served by Macksville USD 351 public school district.
