= Seward Township, Kendall County, Illinois =

Seward Township
- Township
- Location in Kendall County
- Coordinates: 41°30′27″N 088°18′33″W
- Country: United States
- State: Illinois
- County: Kendall

Area
  - Total: 35.09 sq mi (90.9 km^{2})
  - Land: 34.95 sq mi (90.5 km^{2})
  - Water: 0.14 sq mi (0.36 km^{2}) 0.39%
- Elevation: 571 ft (174 m)

Population (2020)
  - Total: 6,655
  - Density: 190.4/sq mi (73.52/km^{2})
- FIPS code: 17-093-68757
- GNIS feature ID: 0429732
- Website: sewardtownshipil.com

Seward Township occupies the 6 mile square in southeast corner of Kendall County, Illinois. As of the 2020 census, its population was 6,655 and it contained 1,966 housing units.

== History ==
Franklin was the original name of Seward Township. On November 14, 1850, the name changed to Seward, after William H. Seward, who served as governor of New York State and as a U.S. Senator from New York as well as Secretary of State in the Lincoln Administration.

== Geography ==
According to the 2021 census gazetteer files, Seward Township has a total area of 35.09 square miles (90.88 km^{2}), of which 34.95 square miles (90.52 km^{2}) (or 99.61%) is land and 0.14 square miles (0.36 km^{2}) (or 0.39%) is water.

It contains portions of Minooka and Joliet. U.S. Route 52 crosses the township east to west, and I-80 runs along the southern boundary of the township.

== Demographics ==
As of the 2020 census there were 6,655 people, 1,427 households, and 1,258 families residing in the township. The population density was 189.66 inhabitants per square mile (73.23/km^{2}). There were 1,966 housing units at an average density of 56.03 per square mile (21.63/km^{2}). The racial makeup of the township was 66.10% White, 11.04% African American, 0.89% Native American, 2.00% Asian, 0.00% Pacific Islander, 7.63% from other races, and 12.34% from two or more races. Hispanic or Latino of any race were 22.13% of the population.

There were 1,427 households, out of which 61.60% had children under the age of 18 living with them, 73.72% were married couples living together, 11.07% had a female householder with no spouse present, and 11.84% were non-families. 11.80% of all households were made up of individuals, and 0.80% had someone living alone who was 65 years of age or older. The average household size was 3.36 and the average family size was 3.62.

The township's age distribution consisted of 32.1% under the age of 18, 7.2% from 18 to 24, 29.9% from 25 to 44, 27.4% from 45 to 64, and 3.3% who were 65 years of age or older. The median age was 33.2 years. For every 100 females, there were 84.6 males. For every 100 females age 18 and over, there were 103.1 males.

The median income for a household in the township was $94,037, and the median income for a family was $100,032. Males had a median income of $56,472 versus $39,570 for females. The per capita income for the township was $34,548. About 0.0% of families and 1.0% of the population were below the poverty line, including 0.0% of those under age 18 and 0.0% of those age 65 or over.

Historical population
Census	Pop.	Note	%±
2000	846		—
2010	4,455		426.6%
2020	6,655		49.4%
U.S. Decennial Census

== Government ==
The township is governed by an elected Town Board of a Supervisor and four Trustees. The Township also has an elected Assessor, Clerk, and Highway Commissioner.
