= Twelve Mile =

Twelve Mile or Twelvemile may refer to:

- Twelve Mile, Indiana, an unincorporated community
- Twelvemile, Missouri, an unincorporated community
- Twelve Mile Circle, part of the Pennsylvania–Delaware boundary
- Twelve Mile Township in Williams County, North Dakota, USA
- Twelve Mile Lake, a lake in Nova Scotia
- Twelve Mile Lake Township, Emmet County, Iowa, USA
- Twelvemile Township, Madison County, Missouri
- Twelve Mile, New South Wales, Australia
- Twelve Mile Creek, New South Wales, Australia
- A twelve nautical mile territorial waters limit

== See also ==
- Twelve Mile Creek (disambiguation)
