= List of United States tornadoes in May 2011 =

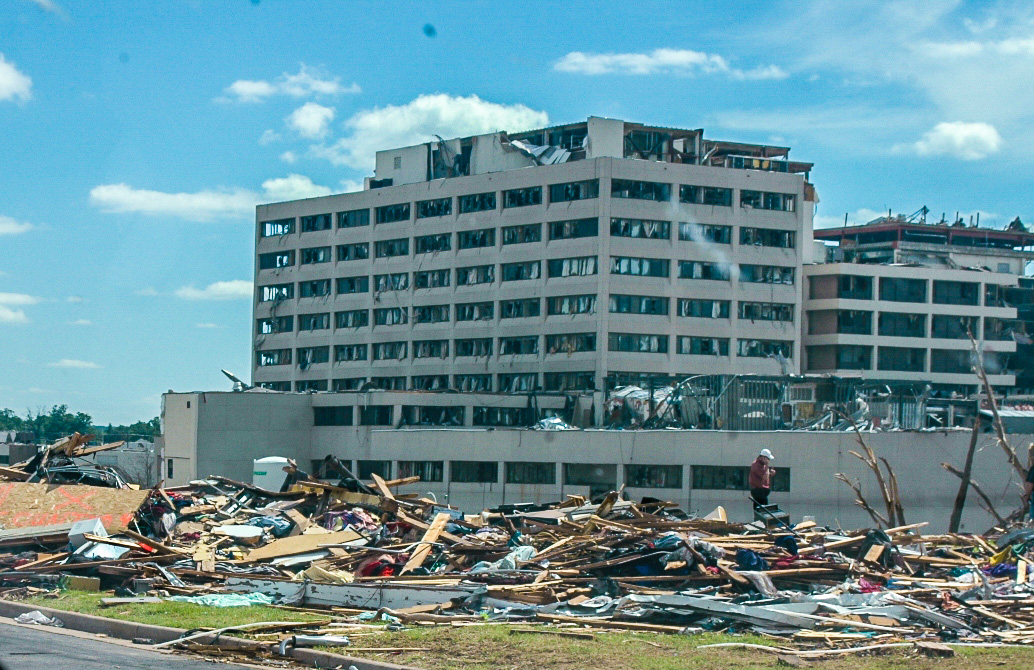
St. John's Regional Medical Center after the May 22 Joplin tornado.

This is a list of all tornadoes that were confirmed by local offices of the National Weather Service in the United States in May 2011. Following the record tornado activity in April, during which 773 tornadoes struck the United States, May exhibited an unusually low number of tornadoes for the first three weeks. Only isolated events occurred until May 9, when five tornadoes struck Nebraska and South Dakota. A small outbreak of 16 tornadoes occurred across the Central United States, with EF0 to EF1 tornadoes caused mainly minor damage across states such as Nebraska, Iowa, and Missouri. The following few days saw isolated tornadoes strike Nebraska, Louisiana, Ohio, Maryland, and Colorado. Scattered weak tornadoes on May 19 impacted Texas, Oklahoma, Kansas, and Colorado, while six more weak tornadoes occurred on May 20. This included an EF1 tornado in Prairie County, Montana, which damaged a ranch.

Activity then abruptly increased with a prolonged and violent tornado outbreak sequence taking place from May 21–26, resulting in 178 fatalities. An EF3 tornado struck Reading, Kansas on May 21, resulting in severe damage and one fatality. An EF5 tornado in Joplin, Missouri resulted in 158 fatalities on May 22, becoming one of the deadliest tornadoes in United States history. This tornado was the most severe of the outbreak, and it caused catastrophic damage across southern portions of the city of Joplin. Elsewhere on May 22, another person was killed by an EF1 tornado that struck Minneapolis, Minnesota and surrounding suburbs, and a high-end EF3 tornado moved from Delaware County, Oklahoma to McDonald County, Missouri, with numerous homes being destroyed. On May 24, a significant outbreak took place in Oklahoma and Arkansas, with another EF5 tornado and two EF4 tornadoes striking areas around Oklahoma City. These three tornadoes resulting in ten fatalities and nearly 300 injuries. Another EF4 tornado moved through Denning, Arkansas just before midnight, with four additional deaths. May 25 featured a large number of tornadoes across Missouri, Illinois and Indiana, with several more tornadoes in other states. This activity continued into the next day, when an EF3 tornado impacted part of St. Tammany Parish, Louisiana and injured four people.

Sporadic tornado activity continued over the final five days of May, most notably on May 30, when approximately 15 tornadoes impacted the northern Great Plains. These included four tornadoes–three EF2 and one EF1–in the Fargo, North Dakota area, resulting in heavy damage to buildings and electrical transmission lines.

== United States yearly total ==
Confirmed tornadoes by Enhanced Fujita rating
| EFU | EF0 | EF1 | EF2 | EF3 | EF4 | EF5 | Total |
|---|---|---|---|---|---|---|---|
| 0 | 802 | 629 | 199 | 62 | 17 | 6 | 1,721 |

== May ==
Confirmed tornadoes by Enhanced Fujita rating
| EFU | EF0 | EF1 | EF2 | EF3 | EF4 | EF5 | Total |
|---|---|---|---|---|---|---|---|
| 0 | 169 | 109 | 35 | 8 | 3 | 2 | 326 |

=== May 1 event ===
List of confirmed tornadoes – Sunday, May 1, 2011 (Note: All dates are based on the local time zone where the tornado touched down; however, all times are in Coordinated Universal Time for consistency.)
| EF# | Location | County / Parish | State | Start Coord. | Time (UTC) | Path length | Max width |
|---|---|---|---|---|---|---|---|
| EF1 | Center Ridge | Conway | AR | 35.3763°N 92.5659°W | 00:13–00:15 | 1 mi (1.6 km) | 75 yd (69 m) |
| EF1 | This brief tornado downed several trees, a few of which damaged homes and outbuildings. Air temperatures were in the low 50s°F at the time of the tornado. | | | | | | |

=== May 2 event ===
List of confirmed tornadoes – Monday, May 2, 2011
| EF# | Location | County / Parish | State | Start Coord. | Time (UTC) | Path length | Max width |
|---|---|---|---|---|---|---|---|
| EF0 | SSW of Blende | Pueblo | CO | 38.19°N 104.57°W | 22:43–22:46 | 0.3 mi (480 m) | 75 yd (69 m) |
| EF0 | Brief landspout with no damage. | | | | | | |

=== May 7 event ===
List of confirmed tornadoes – Saturday, May 7, 2011
| EF# | Location | County / Parish | State | Start Coord. | Time (UTC) | Path length | Max width |
|---|---|---|---|---|---|---|---|
| EF0 | W of Paxton | Ford | IL | 40.4700°N 88.1951°W | 21:06–21:07 | 0.05 mi (80 m) | 10 yd (9.1 m) |
| EF0 | Brief, small tornado in a field with no damage. | | | | | | |
| EF0 | SE of Allerton | Vermilion | IL | 39.9017°N 87.9001°W | 23:08–23:09 | 0.22 mi (350 m) | 25 yd (23 m) |
| EF0 | Brief tornado in a field with no damage. | | | | | | |

=== May 8 event ===
List of confirmed tornadoes – Sunday, May 8, 2011
| EF# | Location | County / Parish | State | Start Coord. | Time (UTC) | Path length | Max width |
|---|---|---|---|---|---|---|---|
| EF0 | SW of Presho | Lyman | SD | 43.83°N 100.17°W | 01:03–01:05 | 0.09 mi (140 m) | 10 yd (9.1 m) |
| EF0 | Small, weak tornado with no damage. | | | | | | |

=== May 9 event ===
List of confirmed tornadoes – Monday, May 9, 2011
| EF# | Location | County / Parish | State | Start Coord. | Time (UTC) | Path length | Max width |
|---|---|---|---|---|---|---|---|
| EF0 | E of Harrison (1st tornado) | Sioux | NE | 42.6800°N 103.7913°W | 00:35 | 0.01 mi (16 m) | 20 yd (18 m) |
| EF0 | Brief tornado with no damage. | | | | | | |
| EF0 | E of Harrison (2nd tornado) | Sioux | NE | 42.6800°N 103.6731°W | 01:10 | 0.01 mi (16 m) | 20 yd (18 m) |
| EF0 | Brief tornado with no damage. | | | | | | |
| EF1 | N of Philip | Haakon | SD | 44.141°N 101.704°W | 02:55–03:05 | 2.55 mi (4.10 km) | 30 yd (27 m) |
| EF1 | Plywood and metal roofing was torn off a ranch house, a metal shed had a collapsed wall and some roof panels torn off, and a grain bin was dented by flying debris. | | | | | | |
| EF0 | W of Ottumwa | Haakon | SD | 44.230°N 101.400°W | 03:45 | 0.01 mi (16 m) | 20 yd (18 m) |
| EF0 | Brief tornado with no damage. | | | | | | |
| EF2 | E of Creighton | Pennington | SD | 44.244°N 102.035°W | 05:07–05:09 | 1.52 mi (2.45 km) | 30 yd (27 m) |
| EF2 | A large electrical transmission tower was crumpled and seven power poles and several trees were snapped by a tornado that remained over mostly grassy areas well to the northeast of Wall. The NCEI database inadvertently lists this as an EF0 tornado. | | | | | | |

=== May 10 event ===
List of confirmed tornadoes – Tuesday, May 10, 2011
| EF# | Location | County / Parish | State | Start Coord. | Time (UTC) | Path length | Max width |
|---|---|---|---|---|---|---|---|
| EF1 | W of Hanover to W of St. Michael | Wright | MN | 45.1705°N 93.7044°W | 00:55–01:01 | 3.14 mi (5.05 km) | 25 yd (23 m) |
| EF1 | Numerous homes sustained damage, mainly to roofs, windows, siding, and soffit. A pole barn was lifted approximately 3 feet (0.91 m), several fences were blown down, and dozens of trees and several power poles were downed. | | | | | | |

=== May 11 event ===
List of confirmed tornadoes – Wednesday, May 11, 2011
| EF# | Location | County / Parish | State | Start Coord. | Time (UTC) | Path length | Max width |
|---|---|---|---|---|---|---|---|
| EF0 | SW of Ayr | Adams | NE | 40.3484°N 98.5141°W | 18:40–18:41 | 0.14 mi (230 m) | 25 yd (23 m) |
| EF0 | This brief tornado damaged a farmstead, destroying four sheds and damaging fences and the door to an outbuilding. | | | | | | |
| EF0 | White Settlement | Tarrant | TX | 32.7477°N 97.4764°W | 18:55–18:56 | 0.49 mi (0.79 km) | 50 yd (46 m) |
| EF0 | A brief tornado touched down in White Settlement, destroying a shed and damaging several homes. Three light poles were snapped, fences were damaged, and several trees were downed as well. | | | | | | |
| EF0 | Lake Kiowa | Cooke | TX | 33.5605°N 97.0210°W | 19:30–19:33 | 1.6 mi (2.6 km) | 75 yd (69 m) |
| EF0 | Twenty-one homes sustained mainly roof damage around Lake Kiowa and many trees were snapped or uprooted. | | | | | | |
| EF1 | NNE of Hampton | Hamilton | NE | 40.9729°N 97.8778°W | 19:50–19:53 | 2.32 mi (3.73 km) | 200 yd (180 m) |
| EF1 | Three irrigation pivots were overturned, two grain bins were destroyed, and seven power poles were downed. | | | | | | |
| EF1 | Osceola | Polk | NE | 41.1598°N 97.5532°W | 20:00–20:02 | 2.29 mi (3.69 km) | 75 yd (69 m) |
| EF1 | An intermittent tornado destroyed four metal sheds south of town, uprooted a large tree in the city park, and damaged a porch and a shed on the north side of town. Several more trees were downed along the path as well. | | | | | | |
| EF0 | NE of Sharpsburg | Taylor | IA | 40.8211°N 94.6188°W | 21:20–21:21 | 0.18 mi (290 m) | 30 yd (27 m) |
| EF0 | Brief tornado with no damage. | | | | | | |
| EF1 | Lenox (1st tornado) | Taylor | IA | 40.8766°N 94.5653°W | 21:38–21:41 | 0.74 mi (1.19 km) | 440 yd (400 m) |
| EF1 | The roof was partially removed from a house, other homes sustained shingle loss, and several trees were downed. | | | | | | |
| EF1 | Lenox (2nd tornado) | Taylor | IA | 40.8784°N 94.5653°W | 21:45–21:50 | 1 mi (1.6 km) | 400 yd (370 m) |
| EF1 | A second tornado touched down only a few blocks southwest of the first one in Lenox. Several homes sustained significant roof and facade damage, with one home losing its entire roof. Several trees were downed as well. | | | | | | |
| EF0 | WNW of Kent | Adams | IA | 40.9554°N 94.4775°W | 21:58–22:20 | 0.44 mi (710 m) | 30 yd (27 m) |
| EF0 | Brief tornado with no damage reported by storm spotter. | | | | | | |
| EF0 | SSE of Locust Grove | Mayes | OK | 36.1595°N 95.1590°W | 23:11–23:12 | 0.5 mi (0.80 km) | 50 yd (46 m) |
| EF0 | A barn and a house were damaged and trees and power poles were downed. | | | | | | |
| EF1 | Bernice | Delaware | OK | 36.6094°N 94.9196°W | 23:47–23:50 | 1.5 mi (2.4 km) | 200 yd (180 m) |
| EF1 | A tornado along Grand Lake o' the Cherokees severely damaged a marina, damaged several boats and a metal building, rolled trailers, and uprooted numerous trees. | | | | | | |
| EF0 | N of Hawarden | Sioux | IA | 43.03°N 96.48°W | 23:53–23:54 | 0.51 mi (0.82 km) | 50 yd (46 m) |
| EF0 | Brief tornado stirred up dust but caused no damage. | | | | | | |
| EF0 | SE of Ashton | Osceola | IA | 43.31°N 95.79°W | 00:07–00:08 | 0.5 mi (0.80 km) | 50 yd (46 m) |
| EF0 | Brief tornado with no damage. | | | | | | |
| EF0 | ESE of Anderson | McDonald | MO | 36.6422°N 94.4224°W | 00:23–00:24 | 0.79 mi (1.27 km) | 75 yd (69 m) |
| EF0 | A brief tornado formed along a gust front ahead of a line of thunderstorms moving into the area. Numerous trees were uprooted and large tree limbs were broken off. A barn was damaged and a house lost a few shingles. | | | | | | |
| EF0 | Papinsville to NNW of Rockville | Bates | MO | 38.0653°N 94.2225°W | 01:21–01:30 | 8.49 mi (13.66 km) | 50 yd (46 m) |
| EF0 | A weak landspout tornado along the leading edge of a line of thunderstorms damaged a few buildings and snapped off small tree limbs and larger trees with hollow or rotten cores. | | | | | | |
| EF0 | Appleton City | St. Clair | MO | 38.1883°N 94.0372°W | 01:35–01:38 | 2.69 mi (4.33 km) | 50 yd (46 m) |
| EF0 | A few homes sustained minor roof damage and several trees were downed along an intermittent path. | | | | | | |

=== May 12 event ===
List of confirmed tornadoes – Thursday, May 12, 2011
| EF# | Location | County / Parish | State | Start Coord. | Time (UTC) | Path length | Max width |
|---|---|---|---|---|---|---|---|
| EF0 | SW of Aurora | Hamilton | NE | 40.7882°N 98.0607°W | 21:46–21:50 | 0.82 mi (1.32 km) | 75 yd (69 m) |
| EF0 | Brief tornado with no damage. | | | | | | |
| EF0 | WNW of Stromsburg (1st tornado) | Polk | NE | 41.1238°N 97.6459°W | 22:33–22:34 | 0.74 mi (1.19 km) | 30 yd (27 m) |
| EF0 | Brief tornado with no damage. | | | | | | |
| EF0 | WNW of Stromsburg (2nd tornado) | Polk | NE | 41.1256°N 97.6929°W | 22:36–22:37 | 0.99 mi (1.59 km) | 30 yd (27 m) |
| EF0 | Brief tornado with no damage. | | | | | | |

=== May 13 event ===
List of confirmed tornadoes – Friday, May 13, 2011
| EF# | Location | County / Parish | State | Start Coord. | Time (UTC) | Path length | Max width |
|---|---|---|---|---|---|---|---|
| EF0 | SW of Grand Isle | Jefferson | LA | 29.2061°N 90.0433°W | 17:46 | 6 mi (9.7 km) | 50 yd (46 m) |
| EF0 | A waterspout briefly moved onshore across the southwestern end of Grand Isle, tearing the roof off a cabin and knocking down power lines. Law enforcement observed the tornado move approximately 6 miles (9.7 km), mainly as a waterspout. | | | | | | |
| EF0 | ENE of McGirr | DeKalb | IL | 41.8283°N 88.7761°W | 18:30–18:32 | 0.09 mi (140 m) | 50 yd (46 m) |
| EF0 | Brief tornado with no damage. | | | | | | |
| EF0 | Buras | Plaquemines | LA | 29.3500°N 89.5300°W | 19:50 | 0.1 mi (160 m) | 25 yd (23 m) |
| EF0 | A waterspout moved onshore and damaged a 40 ft (12 m) section of a motel's roof as well as a sign near South Plaquemines High School. | | | | | | |

=== May 14 event ===
List of confirmed tornadoes – Saturday, May 14, 2011
| EF# | Location | County / Parish | State | Start Coord. | Time (UTC) | Path length | Max width |
|---|---|---|---|---|---|---|---|
| EF0 | Piqua | Miami | OH | 40.1530°N 84.2442°W | 23:42–23:43 | 0.05 mi (80 m) | 10 yd (9.1 m) |
| EF0 | Brief tornado with no damage. | | | | | | |
| EF0 | S of Sidney | Shelby | OH | 40.2511°N 84.1500°W | 00:28–00:29 | 0.02 mi (32 m) | 10 yd (9.1 m) |
| EF0 | Brief tornado with no damage. | | | | | | |

=== May 17 event ===
List of confirmed tornadoes – Tuesday, May 17, 2011
| EF# | Location | County / Parish | State | Start Coord. | Time (UTC) | Path length | Max width |
|---|---|---|---|---|---|---|---|
| EF0 | N of Wolfsville | Frederick | MD | 39.590°N 77.539°W | 21:35–21:39 | 1.1 mi (1.8 km) | 50 yd (46 m) |
| EF0 | Two structures sustained minor shingle damage, siding was partially removed from a house, a backyard play center was snapped from its anchors and rolled, and several trees were snapped or uprooted. | | | | | | |
| EF0 | S of Anton | Washington | CO | 39.6094°N 103.2552°W | 23:45–00:08 | 2.25 mi (3.62 km) | 50 yd (46 m) |
| EF0 | Fences and power lines were damaged. | | | | | | |
| EF1 | Maugansville | Washington | MD | 39.681°N 77.747°W | 00:10–00:18 | 2.11 mi (3.40 km) | 200 yd (180 m) |
| EF1 | Several homes sustained roof damage, several sheds and outbuildings were flipped or destroyed, and a garage door was blown in, leading to failure of the roof. Numerous trees were snapped or uprooted, and an RV was tipped over and blown 45 feet (14 m). | | | | | | |
| EF0 | NE of Anton | Washington | CO | 39.7388°N 103.1960°W | 00:18–00:34 | 2.99 mi (4.81 km) | 50 yd (46 m) |
| EF0 | No damage was documented with this tornado. | | | | | | |

=== May 18 event ===
List of confirmed tornadoes – Wednesday, May 18, 2011
| EF# | Location | County / Parish | State | Start Coord. | Time (UTC) | Path length | Max width |
|---|---|---|---|---|---|---|---|
| EF0 | Northeast Philadelphia | Philadelphia | PA | 40.1002°N 75.0279°W | 17:50–17:51 | 0.12 mi (0.19 km) | 33 yd (30 m) |
| EF0 | A brief tornado damaged a couple businesses and an apartment building. The roof of a car repair shop was caved in, resulting in two injuries, the roof of a beer distributor collapsed, and a seafood restaurant lost part of its roof. This was the first tornado to strike Philadelphia since January 18, 1999. | | | | | | |
| EF1 | NE of Millersburg | Dauphin | PA | 40.5516°N 76.9328°W | 22:05–22:06 | 0.25 mi (0.40 km) | 25 yd (23 m) |
| EF1 | A brief tornado near Millersburg damaged several homes, removed part of a church roof, destroyed several outbuildings, and snapped or uprooted about 15 large trees. | | | | | | |
| EF0 | WSW of Haswell | Kiowa | CO | 38.42°N 103.25°W | 23:55–00:00 | 0.47 mi (0.76 km) | 75 yd (69 m) |
| EF0 | Brief tornado with no damage. | | | | | | |

=== May 19 event ===
List of confirmed tornadoes – Thursday, May 19, 2011
| EF# | Location | County / Parish | State | Start Coord. | Time (UTC) | Path length | Max width |
|---|---|---|---|---|---|---|---|
| EF0 | NNW of Church Hill | Queen Anne's | MD | 39.1736°N 76.0384°W | 16:35–16:45 | 3.69 mi (5.94 km) | 17 yd (16 m) |
| EF0 | A waterspout over the Chester River moved onshore and produced minor, intermittent damage. Shingles were blown off a house, and a play station was damaged. | | | | | | |
| EF0 | N of Dorrance | Russell | KS | 38.8748°N 98.6023°W | 21:43–21:46 | 2.4 mi (3.9 km) | 60 yd (55 m) |
| EF0 | A shed was damaged, and a few trees were downed. | | | | | | |
| EF0 | Wilson Lake | Russell | KS | 38.9015°N 98.5390°W | 21:48–21:52 | 4.08 mi (6.57 km) | 60 yd (55 m) |
| EF0 | This tornado crossed Wilson Lake northeast of Dorrance, damaging a sail boat. | | | | | | |
| EF0 | N of Cooperton | Kiowa | OK | 34.8845°N 98.8700°W | 21:50 | 0.2 mi (320 m) | 20 yd (18 m) |
| EF0 | Brief tornado with no damage. | | | | | | |
| EF0 | ENE of Wilson Lake | Russell | KS | 38.9632°N 98.4691°W | 22:15–22:17 | 0.78 mi (1.26 km) | 50 yd (46 m) |
| EF0 | Brief tornado over open country with no damage. NCEI coordinates show this tornado in Lincoln County, just east of the Russell County line. | | | | | | |
| EF0 | NE of Fountain | El Paso | CO | 38.7135°N 104.6525°W | 22:23–22:29 | 1 mi (1.6 km) | 75 yd (69 m) |
| EF0 | A brief landspout tornado destroyed a camper, overturned a shed, and caused roof, window, and garage damage to a house. | | | | | | |
| EF0 | WSW of Sylvan Grove | Lincoln | KS | 38.9963°N 98.4258°W | 22:25–22:27 | 0.51 mi (0.82 km) | 50 yd (46 m) |
| EF0 | Brief tornado with no damage. | | | | | | |
| EF0 | SE of Fort Cobb | Caddo | OK | 35.0795°N 98.4150°W | 23:09 | 0.2 mi (320 m) | 40 yd (37 m) |
| EF0 | Brief tornado with no damage observed by an NWS employee. | | | | | | |
| EF0 | W of Apache | Caddo | OK | 34.8900°N 98.4129°W | 23:40 | 0.2 mi (320 m) | 20 yd (18 m) |
| EF0 | Small, brief tornado with no damage observed by an NWS employee. | | | | | | |
| EF0 | NE of Oklaunion | Wilbarger | TX | 34.2016°N 99.0534°W | 00:34 | 0.5 mi (0.80 km) | 75 yd (69 m) |
| EF0 | Brief, partially rain-wrapped tornado with no damage. | | | | | | |
| EF0 | Natoma | Osborne | KS | 39.1793°N 99.0268°W | 01:30–01:31 | 0.12 mi (190 m) | 25 yd (23 m) |
| EF0 | A brief tornado on the south side of Natoma caused significant damage to two farmsteads, with cattle panels and feed bunks damaged, hay bales moved, and a hay shed being moved 100 yards (91 m) away. A light pole was broken, and a garage had roofing tin removed as well. | | | | | | |

=== May 20 event ===
List of confirmed tornadoes – Friday, May 20, 2011
| EF# | Location | County / Parish | State | Start Coord. | Time (UTC) | Path length | Max width |
|---|---|---|---|---|---|---|---|
| EF0 | NE of Baldwin | Washington | AR | 36.0349°N 94.1081°W | 13:20–13:21 | 0.5 mi (0.80 km) | 50 yd (46 m) |
| EF0 | This brief tornado in the southeastern part of Fayetteville downed trees at Stonebridge Meadows Golf Club, caused minor fence damage, and blew a trampoline 120 yards (110 m). | | | | | | |
| EF1 | SSE of Locust Grove | Mayes | OK | 36.0982°N 95.1415°W | 14:37–14:38 | 1.5 mi (2.4 km) | 100 yd (91 m) |
| EF1 | A brief tornado damaged buildings, uprooted several fence posts, uprooted a large tree, snapped large limbs, and destroyed a storage shed. | | | | | | |
| EF0 | NE of Manchester | Red River | TX | 33.847°N 95.122°W | 22:36–22:38 | 1.6 mi (2.6 km) | 50 yd (46 m) |
| EF0 | Several trees were downed and small tree limbs were snapped. | | | | | | |
| EF0 | SW of Malvern | Hot Spring | AR | 34.3299°N 92.8382°W | 22:48–22:55 | 3.13 mi (5.04 km) | 100 yd (91 m) |
| EF0 | Shingles were blown off several houses and an apartment complex, and several trees and tree limbs were downed. | | | | | | |
| EF0 | NE of Hallsville to Nesbitt | Harrison | TX | 32.601°N 94.473°W | 23:38–23:45 | 6.83 mi (10.99 km) | 50 yd (46 m) |
| EF0 | A weak tornado caught on video snapped or uprooted several trees. | | | | | | |
| EF1 | S of Terry | Prairie | MT | 46.6642°N 105.3000°W | 02:27–02:28 | 0.09 mi (0.14 km) | 67 yd (61 m) |
| EF1 | A brief tornado on a ranch caused significant damage to four outbuildings destroyed and snapped several large trees. The damage path was roughly 500 feet (150 m). | | | | | | |

=== May 21 event ===
List of confirmed tornadoes – Saturday, May 21, 2011
| EF# | Location | County / Parish | State | Start Coord. | Time (UTC) | Path length | Max width | Damage (Note: All damage totals are in 2011 USD unless otherwise stated.) |
|---|---|---|---|---|---|---|---|---|
| EF0 | W of Purmela | Coryell | TX | 31.4800°N 98.0576°W | 21:24–21:25 | 0.02 mi (32 m) | 25 yd (23 m) | $0 |
| EF0 | A very brief tornado downed a few trees. | | | | | | | |
| EF0 | W of Pauline | Shawnee | KS | 38.9546°N 95.7609°W | 23:16–23:20 | 1.2 mi (1.9 km) | 150 yd (140 m) | Unknown |
| EF0 | The tornado caused minor damage along its path. | | | | | | | |
| EF0 | Southeastern Topeka | Shawnee | KS | 39.0115°N 95.6518°W | 23:35–23:39 | 2.03 mi (3.27 km) | 50 yd (46 m) | Unknown |
| EF0 | Minor tree and structural damage was observed near Lake Shawnee along a narrow path accompanied by rear flank downdraft damage. | | | | | | | |
| EF0 | W of Hamel | Hennepin | MN | 45.0420°N 93.5749°W | 23:36–23:38 | 0.2 mi (0.32 km) | 25 yd (23 m) | $0 |
| EF0 | This brief tornado touched down over an open field and moved through a grove of trees. | | | | | | | |
| EF0 | W of Iowa Point | Doniphan | KS | 39.9200°N 95.2700°W | 23:57–23:59 | 0.27 mi (0.43 km) | 50 yd (46 m) | $0 |
| EF0 | Minor tree damage was observed. | | | | | | | |
| EF0 | WNW of Sulphur | Murray | OK | 34.5211°N 97.0025°W | 00:00 | 0.2 mi (0.32 km) | 30 yd (27 m) | $0 |
| EF0 | A brief tornado caused no known damage. | | | | | | | |
| EF0 | S of Ozawkie | Jefferson | KS | 39.1650°N 95.4520°W | 00:20–00:21 | 1.94 mi (3.12 km) | 50 yd (46 m) | Unknown |
| EF0 | A waterspout over Perry Lake moved ashore, producing tree damage. One tree fell on a mobile home, briefly trapping the resident. | | | | | | | |
| EF0 | ESE of Fillmore | Andrew | MO | 40.0019°N 94.9178°W | 00:30–00:33 | 1.22 mi (1.96 km) | 60 yd (55 m) | $7,000 |
| EF0 | Three homes sustained minor damage, and several trees were downed. | | | | | | | |
| EF1 | E of Hickory to SE of Fitzhugh | Murray, Pontotoc | OK | 34.5600°N 96.8336°W | 00:39–00:53 | 7.2 mi (11.6 km) | 880 yd (800 m) | $8,000 |
| EF1 | A large multi-vortex tornado downed trees and power lines. | | | | | | | |
| EF0 | NW of Vanoss | Pontotoc | OK | 34.7805°N 96.8949°W | 01:18–01:20 | 1 mi (1.6 km) | 50 yd (46 m) | $0 |
| EF0 | No known damage occurred with this tornado. | | | | | | | |
| EF0 | NNE of Vanoss | Pontotoc | OK | 34.7867°N 96.8565°W | 01:29–01:33 | 1 mi (1.6 km) | 50 yd (46 m) | $0 |
| EF0 | No known damage occurred with this tornado. | | | | | | | |
| EF1 | WNW of Ada | Pontotoc | OK | 34.8009°N 96.8202°W | 01:41–01:47 | 3.3 mi (5.3 km) | 150 yd (140 m) | Unknown |
| EF1 | A few homes were damaged in the small community of Center. | | | | | | | |
| EF1 | NE of Emporia | Lyon | KS | 38.4453°N 96.1611°W | 01:50–01:54 | 6.05 mi (9.74 km) | 150 yd (140 m) | Unknown |
| EF1 | Some farm outbuildings were heavily damaged, a chimney collapsed onto a home, and several large trees were snapped. | | | | | | | |
| EF0 | E of Andice | Williamson | TX | 30.7635°N 97.8372°W | 02:00–02:05 | 1.59 mi (2.56 km) | 30 yd (27 m) | $100,000 |
| EF0 | Several mobile homes sustained minor damage, with a carport and deck destroyed. A screened-in porch was tossed over a house, large hay bales were rolled many yards (some into a road), and several trees were downed. The tornado was observed by several local residents. | | | | | | | |
| EF3 | SW of Reading to E of Barclay | Lyon, Osage | KS | 38.5053°N 96.0036°W | 02:10–02:30 | 10.11 mi (16.27 km) | 700 yd (640 m) | >$2,280,000 |
| EF3 | 1 death – See article on this tornado – 5 people were injured. | | | | | | | |
| EF0 | S of Barclay | Osage | KS | 38.5432°N 95.8968°W | 02:20–02:24 | 1.39 mi (2.24 km) | 50 yd (46 m) | Unknown |
| EF0 | This was a satellite tornado to the Reading EF3 tornado. Several trees were blown down and a cow pen was pushed to the northeast. | | | | | | | |
| EF0 | ESE of Worden | Douglas | KS | 38.7525°N 95.2659°W | 03:41 | 0.05 mi (80 m) | 25 yd (23 m) | $0 |
| EF0 | A very brief tornado with no damage. | | | | | | | |
| EF1 | Quenemo | Osage, Franklin | KS | 38.5768°N 95.5333°W | 03:43–03:52 | 2.89 mi (4.65 km) | 100 yd (91 m) | Unknown |
| EF1 | Several houses were damaged, two garages were destroyed, and several trees were downed. | | | | | | | |

=== May 22 event ===
List of confirmed tornadoes – Sunday, May 22, 2011
| EF# | Location | County / Parish | State | Start Coord. | Time (UTC) | Path length | Max width | Damage |
|---|---|---|---|---|---|---|---|---|
| EF1 | St. Louis Park to Northern Minneapolis to NE of Fridley | Hennepin, Anoka, Ramsey | MN | 44.9597°N 93.3472°W | 19:13–19:34 | 13.57 mi (21.84 km) | 880 yd (800 m) | $166,620,000 |
| EF1 | 1 death – A large wedge tornado caused high-end EF1 damage throughout northern Minneapolis and surrounding suburban areas. At least 600 homes sustained major damage in Minneapolis, with 35 more being completely destroyed. Many trees and power lines were downed, while roofs, sheds, and garages sustained significant damage. One man was killed when a tree fell onto his car. In Anoka County, the tornado moved through an industrial area of Fridley, where numerous large warehouses were damaged, including some that lost their roofs. Eight train cars were blown over as well. The tornado weakened considerably as it moved through the northwest tip of Ramsey County and back into Anoka County. Several hangars were damaged at the Anoka County–Blaine Airport before the tornado dissipated. A second person died after suffering a heart attack while clearing debris in the wake of the tornado. Damage from the tornado was estimated at $166 million and 48 people were injured. | | | | | | | |
| EF1 | SW of Park Falls | Price | WI | 45.777°N 90.645°W | 19:33–19:37 | 3.29 mi (5.29 km) | 600 yd (550 m) | $4,000 |
| EF1 | A house sustained minor roof and window damage and multiple trees were snapped or uprooted. | | | | | | | |
| EF2 | NE of Riceville, IA to NE of Harmony, MN | Howard (IA), Fillmore (MN) | IA, MN | 43.4091°N 92.4933°W | 19:33–20:29 | 28.68 mi (46.16 km) | 250 yd (230 m) | $775,000 |
| EF2 | In Iowa, several farmhouses sustained major roof damage, outbuildings were destroyed, and widespread tree damage occurred as the tornado passed near Chester. In Minnesota, structures had their roofs torn off and silos were damaged. Three people were injured in Howard County, with a fourth indirect injury occurring in Fillmore County. | | | | | | | |
| EF0 | E of Lexington | Lafayette | MO | 39.18°N 93.86°W | 19:38–19:40 | 0.25 mi (400 m) | 40 yd (37 m) | $500 |
| EF0 | A brief tornado destroyed an outbuilding. | | | | | | | |
| EF2 | NNW of Ladora to NW of Marengo | Iowa | IA | 41.7916°N 92.2060°W | 19:40–19:45 | 3.88 mi (6.24 km) | 75 yd (69 m) | $250,000 |
| EF2 | Multiple homes were damaged, including one that lost portions of its roof, twelve power poles were snapped, and trees were downed. | | | | | | | |
| EF0 | E of Ham Lake | Anoka | MN | 45.2484°N 93.1623°W | 19:52–19:53 | 0.21 mi (340 m) | 30 yd (27 m) | $50,000 |
| EF0 | A brief tornado downed trees and removed shingles from a few homes. | | | | | | | |
| EF0 | E of Millersburg | Iowa | IA | 41.5776°N 92.0999°W | 19:54–20:00 | 1.96 mi (3.15 km) | 25 yd (23 m) | $10,000 |
| EF0 | A shed was flipped, and trees and power lines were downed. | | | | | | | |
| EF0 | SE of Tripoli | Bremer | IA | 42.79°N 92.23°W | 20:13 | 0.1 mi (160 m) | 30 yd (27 m) | $0 |
| EF0 | A brief tornado caused no damage. | | | | | | | |
| EF0 | SE of Forest Lake | Washington | MN | 45.2374°N 92.9426°W | 20:16–20:20 | 2.64 mi (4.25 km) | 75 yd (69 m) | $50,000 |
| EF0 | A metal shed was damaged, several roofs lost shingles, and trees were downed. | | | | | | | |
| EF0 | N of Higginsville | Lafayette | MO | 39.09°N 93.73°W | 20:25–20:27 | 0.09 mi (140 m) | 50 yd (46 m) | $0 |
| EF0 | A brief tornado in an open field caused no damage. | | | | | | | |
| EF1 | E of Sumner to ENE of Randalia | Fayette | IA | 42.8558°N 92.0078°W | 20:37–20:45 | 7.87 mi (12.67 km) | 70 yd (64 m) | $175,000 |
| EF1 | Several homes, barns, and grain bins were damaged, and numerous trees were downed. | | | | | | | |
| EF0 | Waverly | Lafayette | MO | 39.21°N 93.52°W | 20:58–21:03 | 0.09 mi (140 m) | 50 yd (46 m) | $2,500 |
| EF0 | A mobile home lost much of its roof, a garden shed was damaged, and trees were downed. | | | | | | | |
| EF1 | NE of Brill | Barron | WI | 45.6088°N 91.6253°W | 21:00–21:05 | 1.98 mi (3.19 km) | 300 yd (270 m) | $200,000 |
| EF1 | Roofs were torn off of a log house and farmhouse, a 12-foot (3.7 m) house antenna was blown down, and two 7-foot (2.1 m) tall horse enclosures were destroyed. Numerous large trees were downed as well. The tornado dissipated at the Washburn County line. | | | | | | | |
| EF0 | E of West Union | Fayette | IA | 42.9631°N 91.7316°W | 21:01–21:03 | 1.38 mi (2.22 km) | 350 yd (320 m) | $10,000 |
| EF0 | A house and a barn sustained minor roof damage, and several trees were snapped. | | | | | | | |
| EF2 | WSW of Hokah, MN to E of La Crosse, WI | Houston (MN), La Crosse (WI) | MN, WI | 43.7412°N 91.4574°W | 21:05–21:28 | 13.79 mi (22.19 km) | 150 yd (140 m) | $15,440,000 |
| EF2 | Significant damage to residences, barns, and farm outbuildings occurred at the beginning of the path. Many large trees were snapped or uprooted and roofs were damaged as the tornado passed near Hokah and moved across the Mississippi River. Crossing Green Island, the tornado snapped numerous large trees and caused substantial damage to an ice arena. It then moved into La Crosse, where homes sustained partial roof loss and garages were heavily damaged. Buildings in a small industrial area had partial roof and wall collapse, and a small apartment complex had its roof removed. To the east, more homes and garages were damaged and trees were downed before the tornado dissipated just east of town. In La Crosse, an estimated 200 homes and businesses were damaged and 15 were completely destroyed. This was the first tornado to strike La Crosse since 1966. An estimated 6,300 customers in La Crosse lost power as a result of the tornado. | | | | | | | |
| EF0 | WSW of Parsons | Labette | KS | 37.3244°N 95.3215°W | 21:10–21:11 | 0.33 mi (530 m) | 50 yd (46 m) | $0 |
| EF0 | A brief tornado in an open field caused no damage. | | | | | | | |
| EF1 | N of Rensselaer | Jasper | IN | 40.9607°N 87.1563°W | 21:37–21:38 | 0.32 mi (510 m) | 33 yd (30 m) | $25,000 |
| EF1 | A Farm Bureau Insurance building sustained roof damage, and a Purdue Agricultural Extension office had window, soffit, and fascia damage. | | | | | | | |
| EF1 | SW of Rockland to Sparta | La Crosse, Monroe | WI | 40.9607°N 87.1563°W | 21:47–22:00 | 8.18 mi (13.16 km) | 125 yd (114 m) | $920,000 |
| EF1 | A few trees and buildings were damaged at the beginning of the path. In Monroe County, a house and four mobile homes were destroyed east of Rockland before the tornado struck Sparta, where 50 homes were damaged. At a car dealership on the south side of Sparta, a car was tossed 40 feet (12 m) and flipped upside down, and a billboard was knocked over onto a truck. | | | | | | | |
| EF1 | E of Slater | Saline | MO | 39.22°N 93.06°W | 21:50–21:57 | 3.53 mi (5.68 km) | 75 yd (69 m) | $230,000 |
| EF1 | A high-end EF1 tornado produced sporadic damage, destroying a house near Slater and tossing a single-wide mobile home 50 yards (46 m) near Gilliam. Outbuildings sustained minor damage as well. | | | | | | | |
| EF2 | NW of Tomah to SE of Plover | Monroe, Juneau, Wood, Portage | WI | 44.0429°N 90.5657°W | 22:15–23:46 | 64.5 mi (103.8 km) | 800 yd (730 m) | $7,730,000 |
| EF2 | A very long-lived tornado tracked through mostly wooded areas of west-central Wisconsin, snapping or uprooting thousands of trees and power poles, some of which landed on homes. A house and a mobile home were destroyed at the beginning of the path, and a third home was heavily damaged. The tornado tracked through the Necedah National Wildlife Refuge in Juneau County, and a cranberry farm sustained major damage near Finley, with outbuildings and sheds being demolished and a loading deck platform and trucks being heavily damaged. Homes sustained minor roof and siding damage near the Wood–Juneau county line before a campground along the Wisconsin River south of Nekoosa sustained major damage. Over 100 pines trees were downed, with some damaging numerous camper trailers. Homes and outbuildings were heavily damaged south of Wisconsin Rapids, with a garage losing its entire roof. One person in the garage was injured when it collapsed on a truck. South of Plover, roughly one-half mile of power poles were bent over, and a farmstead was heavily damaged north of Keene. Numerous silos, barns, and outbuildings were destroyed along the path, and at least two dozen irrigation systems were overturned or damaged. The tornado was on the ground for 91 minutes and was one of the longest-tracked tornadoes in Wisconsin history. | | | | | | | |
| EF5 | SW of Joplin to ESE of Diamond | Newton, Jasper | MO | 37.0524°N 94.5932°W | 22:34 – 23:20 | 22.1 mi (35.6 km) | 1,760 yd (1.00 mi) | $2.800102×10^{9} |
| EF5 | 158 deaths – See article on this tornado – The tornado began in Newton County at EF2 intensity before continuing into Jasper County and producing catastrophic EF4 to EF5 damage in Joplin. The tornado reentered Newton County, weakening back to EF2 strength before dissipating east of Diamond. An estimated 1,150 people were injured, and damage amounted to approximately $2.8 billion. | | | | | | | |
| EF0 | W of Prentice | Price | WI | 45.538°N 90.400°W | 22:39–22:41 | 1.15 mi (1.85 km) | 350 yd (320 m) | $1,000 |
| EF0 | A metal barn sustained minor damage, and several trees were downed. | | | | | | | |
| EF0 | NW of Prentice | Price | WI | 45.608°N 90.333°W | 22:52–22:53 | 1.12 mi (1.80 km) | 400 yd (370 m) | $0 |
| EF0 | Trees were downed. | | | | | | | |
| EF0 | E of Phillips | Price | WI | 45.675°N 90.256°W | 23:01–23:04 | 2.14 mi (3.44 km) | 350 yd (320 m) | $5,000 |
| EF0 | Trees were snapped or uprooted, a small shed was destroyed, and a metal barn sustained roof damage. | | | | | | | |
| EF2 | ENE of Diamond to N of Monett | Newton, Lawrence | MO | 37.0052°N 94.1877°W | 23:10–23:40 | 14.13 mi (22.74 km) | 800 yd (730 m) | $1,000,000 |
| EF2 | This large wedge tornado touched down as the Joplin EF5 tornado weakened to the west. Minor tree and roof damage occurred at the beginning of the path before the tornado intensified and destroyed three mobile homes, one of which was wrapped around a tree. Numerous trees and power poles were downed nearby. The tornado struck Wentworth at EF1 strength, removing the roof from an outbuilding and downing numerous trees in town. The tornado regained EF2 strength past Wentworth, where a mobile home was wrapped around a building and a machine shop was partially destroyed. Trees, fences, frame homes, and outbuildings were damaged at EF1 strength further to the east before the tornado dissipated. | | | | | | | |
| EF0 | NE of Jacksboro | Jack | TX | 33.3108°N 98.0409°W | 23:20–23:21 | 0.03 mi (48 m) | 50 yd (46 m) | $0 |
| EF0 | A few trees were downed. | | | | | | | |
| EF1 | E of Forreston to Machesney Park | Ogle, Winnebago | IL | 42.1257°N 89.5406°W | 23:25–23:54 | 29.14 mi (46.90 km) | 200 yd (180 m) | $150,000 |
| EF1 | In Ogle County, two mobile homes were heavily damaged near Adeline, and multiple power poles were snapped or pushed over. In Winnebago County, Kennedy Middle School in Machesney Park had part of its roof blown off, numerous trees were downed, homes sustained minor damage (mainly to shingles, siding, and fascia), and outbuildings were destroyed, with debris scattered up to 400 yards (370 m) away in some cases. | | | | | | | |
| EF0 | NE of Phillips | Price | WI | 45.85°N 90.08°W | 23:26–23:27 | 0.8 mi (1.3 km) | 275 yd (251 m) | $0 |
| EF0 | Several trees were downed in the Chequamegon National Forest. | | | | | | | |
| EF1 | SE of Polo | Ogle | IL | 41.9739°N 89.5696°W | 23:28–23:31 | 1.67 mi (2.69 km) | 200 yd (180 m) | $50,000 |
| EF1 | Several farm buildings and grain bins were damaged, including one grain bin that was ripped from its foundation and one cattle shed that lost its roof. Several beef cattle in the shed were injured, one fatally. Several 2x4's were found speared into the ground, and insulation was plastered against nearby buildings. Shingles were torn from roofs, and multiple trees and power poles were snapped. | | | | | | | |
| EF2 | S of Cleora to SW of Grove | Delaware | OK | 36.5530°N 94.9733°W | 23:33–23:48 | 6.7 mi (10.8 km) | 800 yd (730 m) | $1,000,000 |
| EF2 | A large stovepipe tornado caused major damage along Grand Lake o' the Cherokees. Multiple frame homes were damaged, some heavily. Seven mobile homes were completely destroyed, along with several boat docks. Numerous large trees were snapped or uprooted along the path, which crossed the lake once before dissipating over the lake during a second crossing. | | | | | | | |
| EF1 | NNE of Stillman Valley | Ogle | IL | 42.1465°N 89.1759°W | 23:40–23:42 | 0.5 mi (0.80 km) | 100 yd (91 m) | $50,000 |
| EF1 | A brief tornado destroyed a wood truss electrical transmission line tower, tore off the gable and part of the roof of a house, peeled soffit and shingles from a couple other houses, and overturned semi-truck trailers. Several trees and limbs were downed as well. | | | | | | | |
| EF1 | NE of Neodesha | Wagoner | OK | 42.1465°N 89.1759°W | 23:42–23:48 | 3.5 mi (5.6 km) | 300 yd (270 m) | $0 |
| EF1 | Numerous large trees were snapped or uprooted. | | | | | | | |
| EF3 | WSW of Zena, OK to NNE of Southwest City, MO | Delaware (OK), McDonald (MO) | OK, MO | 36.4812°N 94.8951°W | 23:52–00:36 | 17.93 mi (28.86 km) | 1,550 yd (1,420 m) | $2,000,000 |
| EF3 | See section on this tornado – 4 people were injured. | | | | | | | |
| EF1 | W of Machesney Park | Winnebago | IL | 42.3720°N 89.1681°W | 23:55–23:58 | 2.73 mi (4.39 km) | 50 yd (46 m) | Unknown |
| EF1 | A tornado embedded within a larger area of straight-line winds northeast of Wempletown snapped or uprooted numerous trees, a few of which landed on homes. | | | | | | | |
| EF1 | Eastern Rockton | Winnebago | IL | 42.4584°N 89.0128°W | 23:59–00:01 | 0.9 mi (1.4 km) | 50 yd (46 m) | $15,000 |
| EF1 | A brief tornado blew in a large garage door at a fire station just west of I-39/90. | | | | | | | |
| EF2 | NW of Galena to S of Saddlebrooke | Stone, Taney | MO | 36.8347°N 93.5013°W | 00:10–00:35 | 15.7 mi (25.3 km) | 200 yd (180 m) | $1,050,000 |
| EF2 | A mobile home was destroyed, while a second mobile home and several turkey barns were damaged. A few homes sustained roof and siding damage, and outbuildings were heavily damaged. Numerous trees were snapped or uprooted along the track, and a tower structure was damaged just before the tornado dissipated. | | | | | | | |
| EF1 | ESE of Peggs | Cherokee | OK | 36.0714°N 95.0628°W | 00:27–00:35 | 3 mi (4.8 km) | 250 yd (230 m) | $70,000 |
| EF1 | A mobile home was destroyed, a permanent home sustained roof damage, and several trees were snapped or uprooted. | | | | | | | |
| EF0 | SSW of Kingston | Green Lake | WI | 43.6582°N 89.1851°W | 00:33–00:34 | 0.36 mi (580 m) | 30 yd (27 m) | $1,000 |
| EF0 | A brief, weak tornado damaged a door on a shed, damaged a greenhouse, and broke tree limbs. | | | | | | | |
| EF0 | Markesan to Utley | Green Lake | WI | 43.7153°N 88.9926°W | 00:47–00:55 | 4.21 mi (6.78 km) | 50 yd (46 m) | $5,000 |
| EF0 | Several trees and branches were broken, with some falling on power lines. | | | | | | | |
| EF0 | W of Scraper | Cherokee | OK | 36.0979°N 94.8874°W | 00:50 | 0.1 mi (160 m) | 50 yd (46 m) | $0 |
| EF0 | A brief tornado in an open field caused no damage. | | | | | | | |
| EF1 | NW of Leach to N of Twin Oaks | Delaware | OK | 36.2291°N 94.9451°W | 01:13–01:25 | 4.7 mi (7.6 km) | 400 yd (370 m) | $25,000 |
| EF1 | Several homes and barns were damaged, and a number of large trees were snapped or uprooted. | | | | | | | |
| EF2 | SE of Kansas | Adair, Delaware | OK | 36.1389°N 94.7574°W | 01:14–01:27 | 4.5 mi (7.2 km) | 200 yd (180 m) | $250,000 |
| EF2 | Several homes were heavily damaged, and numerous trees were snapped or uprooted. | | | | | | | |
| EF0 | NE of Twin Oaks | Delaware | OK | 36.2182°N 94.8433°W | 01:29–01:30 | 1 mi (1.6 km) | 100 yd (91 m) | $0 |
| EF0 | A brief tornado over open country northwest of the town of Kansas caused no damage. | | | | | | | |
| EF2 | Dripping Springs to NW of West Siloam Springs | Delaware | OK | 36.1704°N 94.6639°W | 01:30–01:37 | 2.9 mi (4.7 km) | 350 yd (320 m) | $400,000 |
| EF2 | Six mobile homes were destroyed in the Dripping Springs/Moseley area, with twelve people being injured. Several vehicles were rolled, a barn was destroyed, and many trees were snapped or uprooted. | | | | | | | |
| EF1 | NW of West Siloam Springs | Delaware | OK | 36.1845°N 94.6387°W | 01:36–01:40 | 1.7 mi (2.7 km) | 150 yd (140 m) | $0 |
| EF1 | A second tornado formed in the Moseley area, just south of the previous tornado. Large trees were snapped or uprooted. | | | | | | | |
| EF0 | E of Tolley | Renville | ND | 48.7300°N 101.7103°W | 01:41–01:42 | 0.14 mi (230 m) | 25 yd (23 m) | $0 |
| EF0 | A brief tornado witnessed by law enforcement caused no damage. | | | | | | | |
| EF1 | N of West Siloam Springs | Delaware | OK | 36.1975°N 94.5859°W | 01:44–01:45 | 0.5 miles (0.80 km) | 100 yd (91 m) | $0 |
| EF1 | Several trees were snapped or uprooted. | | | | | | | |
| EF1 | WSW of Gentry | Benton | AR | 36.2418°N 94.5330°W | 01:54–02:00 | 2.8 mi (4.5 km) | 450 yd (410 m) | $25,000 |
| EF1 | Several barns and outbuildings were either damaged or destroyed, and numerous large trees were snapped or uprooted. | | | | | | | |

=== May 23 event ===
List of confirmed tornadoes – Monday, May 23, 2011
| EF# | Location | County / Parish | State | Start Coord. | Time (UTC) | Path length | Max width | Damage |
|---|---|---|---|---|---|---|---|---|
| EF0 | ENE of Moody | Howell | MO | 36.54°N 91.92°W | 18:45–18:55 | 1 mi (1.6 km) | 100 yd (91 m) | $10,000 |
| EF0 | An unsecured carport was thrown 150 yards (140 m), a home sustained minor roof damage, and a few trees and tree limbs were downed. | | | | | | | |
| EF0 | NNW of Shawneetown | Cape Girardeau | MO | 37.5803°N 89.6602°W | 20:54–20:56 | 0.48 mi (0.77 km) | 40 yd (37 m) | $1,000 |
| EF0 | A brief tornado caused minor tree damage. Eyewitness reports indicated that there was visible debris when the tornado was on the ground. | | | | | | | |
| EF2 | E of Cocolamus to SSE of Richfield | Juniata | PA | 40.6521°N 77.1909°W | 21:23–21:31 | 4.71 mi (7.58 km) | 250 yd (230 m) | $50,000 |
| EF2 | Severe damage occurred in the Kellerville area, where homes had their roofs torn off and were shifted from their foundations, numerous sheds and outbuildings were destroyed, and a concrete silo was collapsed onto a barn, killing seven cows. Many trees were snapped and uprooted along the path. | | | | | | | |
| EF0 | NW of Okeene | Blaine | OK | 36.1445°N 98.3439°W | 21:26–21:28 | 0.31 mi (500 m) | 15 yd (14 m) | $0 |
| EF0 | Storm chasers observed a brief tornado over open country that caused no damage. | | | | | | | |
| EF0 | N of Mt. Etna | Huntington | IN | 40.7866°N 85.5659°W | 21:32–21:33 | 0.37 mi (600 m) | 30 yd (27 m) | $0 |
| EF0 | Several trees were downed. | | | | | | | |
| EF1 | N of Winfield | Union, Northumberland | PA | 40.9183°N 76.8619°W | 21:39–21:42 | 1.24 mi (2.00 km) | 100 yd (91 m) | $50,000 |
| EF1 | Several homes were damaged, some heavily. Outbuildings and a two-story cinder-block shed were destroyed, with debris found embedded into nearby trees. Many trees were downed as well, some of which landed on homes in addition to recreational vehicles and a pavilion at a campground. | | | | | | | |
| EF0 | SSW of McMillan | Luce, Mackinac | MI | 46.2625°N 85.7272°W | 22:15–22:21 | 2.4 mi (3.9 km) | 50 yd (46 m) | $0 |
| EF0 | A brief waterspout over Manistique Lake caused no damage. | | | | | | | |
| EF1 | SE of Equality to ENE of Shawneetown | Gallatin | IL | 37.7044°N 88.2977°W | 22:25–22:35 | 11.84 mi (19.05 km) | 200 yd (180 m) | $250,000 |
| EF1 | Several homes and buildings in the Junction and Shawneetown areas sustained minor to moderate damage. Several barns or sheds were destroyed, and dozens of trees were snapped or uprooted. | | | | | | | |
| EF1 | SE of Brockton | Schuylkill | PA | 40.7370°N 76.0501°W | 22:37–22:38 | 0.22 mi (350 m) | 75 yd (69 m) | $20,000 |
| EF1 | A brief tornado embedded in a larger area of downburst winds snapped about 25 trees. | | | | | | | |
| EF0 | S of Sunman | Ripley, Dearborn | IN | 39.202°N 85.107°W | 22:43–22:47 | 3.08 mi (4.96 km) | 50 yd (46 m) | $45,000 |
| EF0 | A barn was destroyed, a pole barn had its roof torn off, a power pole was snapped, and trees were downed. | | | | | | | |
| EF0 | E of Fairfax | Osage | OK | 36.5722°N 96.6938°W | 22:52 | 0.1 mi (160 m) | 50 yd (46 m) | $0 |
| EF0 | A brief tornado over open country caused no damage. | | | | | | | |
| EF1 | SW of Ohio City | Van Wert | OH | 40.7541°N 84.6896°W | 22:56–23:02 | 4.11 mi (6.61 km) | 100 yd (91 m) | Unknown |
| EF1 | Multiple barns were damaged, siding was stripped from a house, and a wooden swing-set was tossed. Large trees were uprooted, 2x4s were embedded into the ground, and sheet metal was wrapped around trees as well. The tornado reportedly displayed a double funnel momentarily before merging into a single funnel. | | | | | | | |
| EF0 | Weissport East | Carbon | PA | 40.8371°N 75.6953°W | 23:25–23:26 | 0.43 mi (690 m) | 50 yd (46 m) | $75,000 |
| EF0 | One home was badly damaged and about a dozen others sustained minor damage, along with a church and a baseball field. A trampoline was blown 30 feet (9.1 m) while a second trampoline was tossed into the church's sign. A metal shed was damaged, a swing set was toppled, and numerous trees were downed as well. One person was injured by a collapsed wall. | | | | | | | |
| EF2 | SW of Big Rock, TN to NW of Pembroke, KY | Stewart (TN), Montgomery (TN), Christian (KY) | TN, KY | 36.5497°N 87.8276°W | 23:52–00:27 | 30.29 mi (48.75 km) | 175 yd (160 m) | $612,000 |
| EF2 | In Tennessee, the tornado caused heavy roof damage to several homes, including one that lost its entire roof. Two people were injured in this area when their mobile home was destroyed, with debris scattered downwind. The tornado passed through the northwestern tip of Montgomery County on Fort Campbell before crossing the state line. In Kentucky, multiple barns and grain bins were destroyed. In one collapsed barn, 45 dairy cows were trapped, although only two were injured; one cow nearby was thrown 500 feet (150 m). The roof was torn off of an agricultural chemical storage building, a tool barn was destroyed, and a semi-truck was flipped on Interstate 24, injuring the driver. Numerous trees were snapped and uprooted, one of which fell on a house near Pembroke. Three people were injured in total. | | | | | | | |
| EF0 | ESE of Edenton | Clermont | OH | 39.215°N 84.013°W | 23:43–23:44 | 0.21 mi (340 m) | 33 yd (30 m) | $30,000 |
| EF0 | A wood-frame metal barn was destroyed, with debris scattered up to 400 yards away, two high-voltage towers were blown down, and trees and tree limbs were snapped. | | | | | | | |
| EF1 | E of Fairborn | Greene | OH | 39.7964°N 83.9634°W | 23:55–23:56 | 0.95 mi (1.53 km) | 100 yd (91 m) | $3,000 |
| EF1 | Many trees were snapped or uprooted as the tornado moved through a golf course. | | | | | | | |
| EF1 | NNE of Springfield | Clark | OH | 39.9909°N 83.7618°W | 00:10–00:11 | 0.4 mi (640 m) | 100 yd (91 m) | $18,000 |
| EF1 | Concrete blocks were lifted onto a roof, four power poles were downed, and a house had insulation pulled out of it. A convergent pattern was noted in a wheat field as well. | | | | | | | |

=== May 24 event ===
List of confirmed tornadoes – Tuesday, May 24, 2011
| EF# | Location | County / Parish | State | Start Coord. | Time (UTC) | Path length | Max width | Damage |
|---|---|---|---|---|---|---|---|---|
| EF0 | W of Satanta | Haskell | KS | 37.421°N 101.068°W | 19:35–19:38 | 0.48 mi (770 m) | 50 yd (46 m) | $0 |
| EF0 | A brief tornado over open country lofted dust and vegetation but caused no damage. | | | | | | | |
| EF0 | E of Lamar | Prowers | CO | 38.0860°N 102.5262°W | 20:10–20:15 | 0.25 mi (400 m) | 75 yd (69 m) | $0 |
| EF0 | A brief landspout tornado confirmed by the Colorado Department of Transportation caused no damage. | | | | | | | |
| EF3 | WNW of Canton to SW of Fairview | Dewey, Blaine, Major | OK | 36.059°N 98.644°W | 20:20–20:44 | 13.2 mi (21.2 km) | 880 yd (800 m) | Unknown |
| EF3 | 1 death – See section on this tornado – 2 people were injured. | | | | | | | |
| EF3 | WSW of Lookeba to SSE of Hinton | Caddo | OK | 35.350°N 98.441°W | 20:31–20:46 | 8.6 mi (13.8 km) | 800 yd (730 m) | Unknown |
| EF3 | This large multiple-vortex wedge tornado either heavily damaged or destroyed several structures, mangled/debarked many trees, and snapped several power poles. It preceded the EF5 tornado that tracked from east of Hinton to Guthrie, Oklahoma, dissipating just four minutes before the EF5 tornado formed. Initial surveys listed this damage path as part of the same tornado but follow up investigations of mobile radar observations and damage path surveys revealed that this was a separate tornado. | | | | | | | |
| EF0 | NW of Ingalls | Gray | KS | 37.923°N 100.543°W | 20:34–20:36 | 0.44 mi (710 m) | 50 yd (46 m) | $0 |
| EF0 | A brief, weak tornado over open country caused no damage. | | | | | | | |
| EF0 | SSE of Eminence | Finney | KS | 38.02°N 100.44°W | 20:45–20:46 | 0.3 mi (480 m) | 50 yd (46 m) | $0 |
| EF0 | A brief, weak tornado over open country caused no damage. | | | | | | | |
| EF0 | SW of Fairview | Major | OK | 36.236°N 98.507°W | 20:47–20:51 | 0.7 mi (1.1 km) | 80 yd (73 m) | $0 |
| EF0 | This tornado was observed by spotters. It remained over open country and caused no damage. | | | | | | | |
| EF5 | ESE of Hinton to Piedmont to NE of Guthrie | Canadian, Kingfisher, Logan | OK | 35.444°N 98.287°W | 20:50–22:35 | 63.1 mi (101.5 km) | 1,760 yd (1,610 m) | Unknown |
| EF5 | 9 deaths – See article on this tornado – 181 people were injured. | | | | | | | |
| EF0 | Bolton to Hansonville | Russell | VA | 36.80°N 82.22°W | 20:55–20:58 | 4.24 mi (6.82 km) | 50 yd (46 m) | $30,000 |
| EF0 | Several trees were downed along the path, which paralleled U.S. Highway 58A. | | | | | | | |
| EF0 | NW of Richland | Canadian | OK | 35.622°N 97.856°W | 21:37–21:39 | 1.5 mi (2.4 km) | 50 yd (46 m) | $0 |
| EF0 | A small satellite tornado to the larger EF5 tornado was observed to be rotating around the parent storm just west of Piedmont by an employee of the Storm Prediction Center. The tornado produced no known damage. | | | | | | | |
| EF2 | SE of Seward to SW of Great Bend | Stafford, Barton | KS | 38.153°N 98.705°W | 21:52–22:13 | 11.81 mi (19.01 km) | 500 yd (460 m) | Unknown |
| EF2 | 2 deaths – A house had its roof torn off, and a large tree next to the driveway crushed a van parked nearby, killing two of the occupants and severely injuring a third. Outbuildings and fences were also damaged, and numerous trees were downed. | | | | | | | |
| EF4 | Chickasha to WSW of Moore | Grady, McClain, Cleveland | OK | 35.008°N 97.961°W | 22:06–23:02 | 33.3 mi (53.6 km) | 880 yd (800 m) | Unknown |
| EF4 | 1 death – See article on this tornado – 48 people were injured. | | | | | | | |
| EF1 | NW of Ellinwood | Barton | KS | 38.3697°N 98.5803°W | 22:09–22:17 | 5.14 mi (8.27 km) | 75 yd (69 m) | $250,000 |
| EF1 | Three farmsteads were struck, with barns, sheds, and farm houses sustaining moderate to heavy damage. One person was injured. | | | | | | | |
| EF0 | SE of Timken | Rush | KS | 38.441°N 99.156°W | 22:20–22:25 | 0.64 mi (1.03 km) | 75 yd (69 m) | $0 |
| EF0 | A brief, small tornado over open country caused no damage. | | | | | | | |
| EF4 | W of Bradley to Goldsby | Grady, McClain | OK | 34.880°N 97.732°W | 22:26–23:05 | 23.1 mi (37.2 km) | 880 yd (800 m) | Unknown |
| EF4 | See article on this tornado – 61 people were injured. | | | | | | | |
| EF0 | E of Timken to NE of Bison | Rush | KS | 38.4739°N 99.1495°W | 22:35–22:49 | 6.15 mi (9.90 km) | 1,200 yd (1,100 m) | Unknown |
| EF0 | A large multiple-vortex wedge tornado was observed by storm chasers and remained mostly over open country. Due to extensive flooding afterward, much of the path was inaccessible and the extent of the damage is unknown. | | | | | | | |
| EF0 | SW of Newcastle | McClain | OK | 35.242°N 97.628°W | 22:45–22:46 | 0.7 mi (1.1 km) | 50 yd (46 m) | $0 |
| EF0 | A brief satellite tornado to the EF4 Chickasha tornado caused minimal damage. | | | | | | | |
| EF0 | SE of St. Jo | Montague | TX | 33.6795°N 97.5054°W | 22:46–22:47 | 0.02 mi (32 m) | 30 yd (27 m) | $0 |
| EF0 | A brief tornado downed a few trees. | | | | | | | |
| EF2 | SSW of Stillwater | Payne | OK | 36.034°N 97.163°W | 22:50–23:05 | 10.4 mi (16.7 km) | 880 yd (800 m) | Unknown |
| EF2 | Several homes and other structures sustained significant roof, siding, and chimney damage, and several barns and outbuildings were either heavily damaged or destroyed. Extensive tree and power line damage occurred as well. 18 people were injured. | | | | | | | |
| EF1 | SE of Rozel | Pawnee | KS | 38.145°N 99.387°W | 23:01–23:14 | 4.67 mi (7.52 km) | 200 yd (180 m) | $110,000 |
| EF1 | Irrigation sprinklers were damaged, and trees were downed. | | | | | | | |
| EF1 | SE of Goldsby | McClain | OK | 35.109°N 97.451°W | 23:02–23:03 | 0.5 mi (0.80 km) | 40 yd (37 m) | Unknown |
| EF1 | A satellite tornado to the EF4 Goldsby tornado inflicted damage to barns. | | | | | | | |
| EF0 | SSE of Rush Center | Pawnee | KS | 38.278°N 99.255°W | 23:27–23:31 | 1.32 mi (2.12 km) | 150 yd (140 m) | $0 |
| EF0 | This tornado remained over open country and caused no damage. | | | | | | | |
| EF2 | SSW of McLoud | Pottawatomie | OK | 35.373°N 97.131°W | 23:36–23:39 | 2 mi (3.2 km) | 50 yd (46 m) | Unknown |
| EF2 | A narrow but strong tornado tore the roof off a telephone company building, caused extensive tree damage, and damaged several sheds. Several homes sustained roof and window damage, one of which also had its attached garage destroyed. The tornado was broadcast live on television as it tossed a semi-truck from I-40 and destroyed it. 32 people were injured. | | | | | | | |
| EF0 | NE of Nocona | Montague | TX | 33.8632°N 97.6434°W | 23:40–23:41 | 0.01 mi (16 m) | 30 yd (27 m) | $0 |
| EF0 | A brief tornado on the east side of Lake Nocona remained over open country and caused no damage. | | | | | | | |
| EF1 | W of Hominy | Osage | OK | 36.4103°N 96.5812°W | 23:44–23:47 | 2.8 mi (4.5 km) | 40 yd (37 m) | $0 |
| EF1 | Trees were uprooted, and tree limbs were snapped. | | | | | | | |
| EF2 | NW of Hominy to WNW of Pawhuska | Osage | OK | 36.465°N 96.576°W | 23:49–00:14 | 17 mi (27 km) | 750 yd (690 m) | $20,000 |
| EF2 | Many trees were downed, and power poles were snapped. | | | | | | | |
| EF0 | E of Hoisington | Barton | KS | 38.5256°N 98.6830°W | 00:11–00:12 | 0.37 mi (600 m) | 50 yd (46 m) | $0 |
| EF0 | This brief tornado occurred over open country and caused no damage. | | | | | | | |
| EF0 | NNE of Claflin | Barton | KS | 38.5353°N 98.5439°W | 00:22–00:25 | 3.38 mi (5.44 km) | 50 yd (46 m) | $0 |
| EF0 | A weak tornado moved over open country and caused no damage. | | | | | | | |
| EF1 | N of Ravia to N of Tishomingo | Johnston | OK | 34.252°N 96.760°W | 00:30–00:45 | 5.5 mi (8.9 km) | 1,200 yd (1,100 m) | Unknown |
| EF1 | A large multiple-vortex tornado struck rural areas, where widespread tree damage occurred. Two homes were damaged by falling trees, four other homes sustained roof damage due to wind, and a grain silo lost its roof. | | | | | | | |
| EF0 | SW of Gainesville | Cooke | TX | 33.5088°N 97.2695°W | 00:32–00:36 | 1.56 mi (2.51 km) | 100 yd (91 m) | $0 |
| EF0 | A brief tornado caused minor tree damage; it was videoed on the ground for approximately four minutes. | | | | | | | |
| EF0 | NNE of Rhome | Wise | TX | 33.0814°N 97.4511°W | 00:38–00:39 | 0.03 mi (48 m) | 30 yd (27 m) | $2,000 |
| EF0 | A brief tornado caused minor damage to barns. | | | | | | | |
| EF0 | SW of Reno | Parker | TX | 32.9177°N 97.6105°W | 00:38–00:40 | 0.42 mi (0.68 km) | 40 yd (37 m) | $10,000 |
| EF0 | A tornado just northwest of Sanctuary damaged the roof of a mobile home and downed several trees. | | | | | | | |
| EF0 | E of Azle | Tarrant | TX | 32.880°N 97.490°W | 00:45–00:47 | 1.69 mi (2.72 km) | 50 yd (46 m) | $1,000 |
| EF0 | A tornado was observed over Eagle Mountain Lake, with minor tree damage noted on the eastern shore. | | | | | | | |
| EF0 | N of Wilson | Ellsworth | KS | 38.8508°N 98.4784°W | 00:50–00:52 | 0.45 mi (0.72 km) | 50 yd (46 m) | $1,000 |
| EF0 | A brief tornado occurred over open country caused no damage. | | | | | | | |
| EF2 | SW of Denton | Denton | TX | 33.1359°N 97.1911°W | 00:51–00:56 | 1.52 mi (2.45 km) | 220 yd (200 m) | $750,000 |
| EF2 | A strong rope tornado moved through a subdivision of between Argyle and Denton, causing major roof damage to several homes, two of which sustained EF2 damage. A barn was destroyed and trees were downed as well. | | | | | | | |
| EF1 | Irving | Dallas | TX | 32.8291°N 96.9811°W | 01:23–01:30 | 1.37 mi (2.20 km) | 500 yd (460 m) | $150,000 |
| EF1 | A few apartment buildings and several houses sustained severe roof damage, with roofing material removed, chimneys collapsed, and air-conditioning units destroyed. A metal roof was torn off a retail building, with other businesses sustaining lesser damage. Many trees were downed as well, one of which fell through the second story of a home. | | | | | | | |
| EF2 | SW of Haskell to SSW of Redbird | Muskogee, Wagoner | OK | 35.7631°N 95.7423°W | 01:42–02:00 | 10.2 mi (16.4 km) | 400 yd (370 m) | $110,000 |
| EF2 | The tornado moved through Haskell, where a mobile home and a barn were destroyed, several homes were damaged, and large trees and several power poles were snapped. | | | | | | | |
| EF2 | ESE of Wagoner | Wagoner | OK | 35.9420°N 95.3754°W | 02:13–02:20 | 4.4 mi (7.1 km) | 450 yd (410 m) | $400,000 |
| EF2 | This tornado began on the south side of Wagoner and moved eastward toward Fort Gibson Reservoir. In Wagoner, about a dozen homes sustained roof damage and a carport was destroyed. East of town, numerous campers and trailers were severely damaged or destroyed, several mobile homes were destroyed, and several more permanent homes were damaged. Numerous large trees were either snapped or uprooted along the path. | | | | | | | |
| EF0 | SW of Balch Springs | Dallas | TX | 32.6709°N 96.6841°W | 02:48 | 0.01 mi (16 m) | 30 yd (27 m) | $0 |
| EF0 | A brief tornado along I-20 near the Trinity River caused minor tree damage. | | | | | | | |
| EF1 | NW of Leach to N of Twin Oaks | Delaware | OK | 36.2264°N 94.9542°W | 02:48–02:59 | 7 mi (11 km) | 150 yd (140 m) | $0 |
| EF1 | Trees were uprooted, and tree limbs were snapped. | | | | | | | |
| EF1 | NNE of Panola | Latimer | OK | 35.0021°N 95.2106°W | 02:50–02:55 | 2.5 mi (4.0 km) | 300 yd (270 m) | $0 |
| EF1 | Hundreds of trees were either snapped or uprooted in a rugged area of the Sans Bois Mountains. The start and end points were inaccessible, and the survey was done via an ATV. | | | | | | | |
| EF1 | NW of Colcord | Delaware | OK | 36.2757°N 94.7575°W | 03:06–03:16 | 6 mi (9.7 km) | 150 yd (140 m) | $0 |
| EF1 | Trees were uprooted, and large tree limbs were snapped. | | | | | | | |
| EF0 | SSE of Talihina | Le Flore | OK | 34.6942°N 95.0378°W | 03:14–03:16 | 1.5 mi (2.4 km) | 100 yd (91 m) | $0 |
| EF0 | This tornado observed over open country; no damage occurred. | | | | | | | |
| EF0 | W of Cedarvale | Kaufman | TX | 32.5755°N 96.1109°W | 03:43–03:44 | 0.01 mi (16 m) | 20 yd (18 m) | $0 |
| EF0 | A brief tornado caused minor tree damage. | | | | | | | |
| EF2 | WSW of Hodgen to NE of Howe | Le Flore | OK | 34.8256°N 94.7248°W | 03:44–04:02 | 12 mi (19 km) | 1,760 yd (1,610 m) | $100,000 |
| EF2 | A mobile home was destroyed, several permanent homes were damaged, dozens of power poles were snapped, and numerous large trees were either snapped or uprooted. | | | | | | | |
| EF1 | NE of Roland, OK to NW of Van Buren, AR | Sequoyah (OK), Crawford (AR) | OK, AR | 35.4400°N 94.4595°W | 04:37–04:47 | 5.2 mi (8.4 km) | 800 yd (730 m) | $50,000 |
| EF1 | Many trees were knocked down in Oklahoma before the tornado crossed into Arkansas, where siding was blown off a metal building, several homes were damaged, several barns were destroyed, and more trees were downed. | | | | | | | |
| EF4 | S of Branch to Denning to SE of Rosetta | Franklin, Logan, Johnson | AR | 35.2781°N 93.9515°W | 04:53–05:50 | 45.71 mi (73.56 km) | 2,200 yd (2,000 m) | $9,075,000 |
| EF4 | 4 deaths – See section on this tornado – 27 people were injured. | | | | | | | |

=== May 25 event ===
List of confirmed tornadoes – Wednesday, May 25, 2011
| EF# | Location | County / Parish | State | Start Coord. | Time (UTC) | Path length | Max width | Damage |
|---|---|---|---|---|---|---|---|---|
| EF3 | SW of Clarksville to SW of Pelsor | Johnson, Pope | AR | 35.4227°N 93.5302°W | 05:25–05:57 | 29.01 mi (46.69 km) | 1,430 yd (1,310 m) | $13,025,000 |
| EF3 | 1 death – See section on this tornado – 4 people were injured. The section of the path in Clarksville was very similar to an F3 tornado that occurred on April 7, 1980. | | | | | | | |
| EF1 | SW of Dogwood to SE of Seymour | Douglas, Webster | MO | 37.030°N 92.840°W | 06:30–06:45 | 9.27 mi (14.92 km) | 100 yd (91 m) | $20,000 |
| EF1 | A house sustained minor roof damage, several outbuildings were damaged or destroyed, and numerous trees were either snapped or uprooted along the path. | | | | | | | |
| EF1 | ENE of Decatur | Macon | IL | 39.8570°N 88.8445°W | 12:35–12:37 | 0.99 mi (1.59 km) | 75 yd (69 m) | $165,000 |
| EF1 | Two outbuildings and two grain bins were damaged. | | | | | | | |
| EF1 | NE of Oakley | Macon | IL | 39.8804°N 88.7739°W | 12:39–12:42 | 1.48 mi (2.38 km) | 75 yd (69 m) | $100,000 |
| EF1 | An outbuilding was destroyed, and a grain bin was damaged. | | | | | | | |
| EF1 | Leesville to NE of Hopkins Park | Kankakee | IL | 41.0229°N 87.6272°W | 14:04–14:12 | 5.78 mi (9.30 km) | 50 yd (46 m) | $250,000 |
| EF1 | Several houses sustained mainly roof damage, a camper was overturned, and two concrete block buildings were destroyed, along with a grain bin and storage sheds. One home that was under construction had an attached garage ripped off, and trees and power poles were snapped along the path. | | | | | | | |
| EF0 | W of Morocco | Newton | IN | 40.9409°N 87.4637°W | 14:13–14:14 | 0.1 mi (160 m) | 20 yd (18 m) | $25,000 |
| EF0 | A brief tornado snapped tree limbs and collapsed a barn. | | | | | | | |
| EF2 | S of Mount Ayr | Newton | IN | 40.9110°N 87.3088°W | 14:19–14:21 | 1.9 mi (3.1 km) | 300 yd (270 m) | $50,000 |
| EF2 | A house and a shed were damaged, with a small swath of corn strewn between the structures. Wooden projectiles from the shed left gouge marks in the ground. A grain bin was blown 200 yards (180 m), and an auger weighing over 100 pounds (45 kg) was thrown up to 150 feet (46 m). Several large trees and ten power poles were snapped as well. | | | | | | | |
| EF1 | NW of Rensselaer | Jasper | IN | 40.9409°N 87.2104°W | 14:24–14:27 | 2.91 mi (4.68 km) | 100 yd (91 m) | $500 |
| EF1 | Many trees were either snapped or uprooted, and a wooden light pole was snapped. | | | | | | | |
| EF1 | Southern Rensselaer | Jasper | IN | 40.9144°N 87.1612°W | 14:26–14:28 | 1.95 mi (3.14 km) | 100 yd (91 m) | $50,000 |
| EF1 | A tornado struck the south side of Rensselaer, where shingles were removed from structures, a truck was overturned, and trees and power lines were downed. | | | | | | | |
| EF0 | Francesville | Pulaski | IN | 40.9829°N 86.8936°W | 14:45–14:46 | 0.78 mi (1.26 km) | 50 yd (46 m) | Unknown |
| EF0 | A pole barn was destroyed, and several trees and power poles were knocked down in Francesville. | | | | | | | |
| EF0 | Louisburg | Miami | KS | 38.6175°N 94.6878°W | 15:45–15:47 | 0.05 mi (80 m) | 40 yd (37 m) | $5,000 |
| EF0 | A truck was overturned, and several buildings sustained minor damage on the west side of town. | | | | | | | |
| EF0 | Southern Overland Park | Johnson | KS | 38.8333°N 94.6419°W | 16:10–16:12 | 0.68 mi (1.09 km) | 60 yd (55 m) | $10,000 |
| EF0 | A brief tornado in the Stanley neighborhood of Overland Park caused roof damage to Blue Valley Middle School and downed several trees. | | | | | | | |
| EF0 | Southern Overland Park | Johnson | KS | 38.8831°N 94.6669°W | 16:22 | 0.05 mi (80 m) | 40 yd (37 m) | $0 |
| EF0 | A second tornado near the Stanley neighborhood touched down briefly in a suburban area, causing no noticeable damage. | | | | | | | |
| EF0 | SE of Harrisonville | Cass | MO | 38.6200°N 94.3008°W | 16:35 | 0.05 mi (80 m) | 40 yd (37 m) | $0 |
| EF0 | A brief tornado caused no damage. | | | | | | | |
| EF0 | Lenexa | Johnson | KS | 38.9569°N 94.7331°W | 16:38 | 0.05 mi (80 m) | 40 yd (37 m) | $0 |
| EF0 | A brief tornado touched down in a suburban area, causing no noticeable damage. | | | | | | | |
| EF2 | Southern Sedalia | Pettis | MO | 38.6619°N 93.2200°W | 17:22–17:28 | 2.11 mi (3.40 km) | 500 yd (460 m) | $4,000,000 |
| EF2 | A strong tornado moved through the south side of Sedalia, heavily damaging or destroying numerous homes and businesses. 70 mobile homes were damaged or destroyed in two separate mobile home parks, and numerous trees and power poles were snapped. Several tanker trucks and semi-trucks were flipped and damaged, along with several school buses stored in a bus barn. Twenty people sustained mostly minor injuries. | | | | | | | |
| EF0 | Western Liberty | Clay | MO | 39.2511°N 94.4442°W | 17:33 | 0.05 mi (80 m) | 40 yd (37 m) | $0 |
| EF0 | A brief tornado caused no damage. | | | | | | | |
| EF0 | W of Kearney | Clay | MO | 39.3742°N 94.3864°W | 17:45 | 0.05 mi (80 m) | 40 yd (37 m) | $0 |
| EF0 | A brief tornado caused no damage. | | | | | | | |
| EF0 | NE of Beaman | Pettis | MO | 38.7678°N 93.1172°W | 17:52 | 0.05 mi (80 m) | 40 yd (37 m) | $0 |
| EF0 | A brief tornado caused no damage. | | | | | | | |
| EF0 | NW of Pleasant Green | Cooper | MO | 38.8369°N 93.0356°W | 18:04 | 0.05 mi (80 m) | 40 yd (37 m) | $0 |
| EF0 | A brief tornado caused no damage. | | | | | | | |
| EF0 | SW of Higginsville | Lafayette | MO | 39.0536°N 93.7375°W | 18:07 | 0.05 mi (80 m) | 40 yd (37 m) | $0 |
| EF0 | A brief tornado caused no damage. | | | | | | | |
| EF1 | NW of New Florence to NW of Bellflower | Montgomery | MO | 38.9430°N 91.4702°W | 19:15–19:22 | 7.08 mi (11.39 km) | 100 yd (91 m) | Unknown |
| EF1 | Several farmsteads were struck by a high-end EF1 tornado, with multiple outbuildings, grain bins, and machine sheds being damaged or destroyed. Metal roofing from a couple locations was thrown up to a half mile away and, in one instance, wrapped around high tension power lines. Extensive tree damage occurred along the path. | | | | | | | |
| EF0 | Northwestern Van Wert | Van Wert | OH | 40.8801°N 84.5976°W | 19:26–19:27 | 0.15 mi (240 m) | 40 yd (37 m) | $0 |
| EF0 | A brief tornado downed a few power poles on the northwest side of town. | | | | | | | |
| EF1 | N of Myrtle | Oregon | MO | 36.5709°N 91.2428°W | 19:56–20:05 | 2.5 mi (4.0 km) | 100 yd (91 m) | $20,000 |
| EF1 | Several trees were snapped or uprooted, and three outbuildings sustained minor roof damage. | | | | | | | |
| EF3 | SW of Grandin to Ellsinore to NW of Buckhorn | Carter, Wayne, Madison | MO | 36.8147°N 90.8492°W | 20:49–21:46 | 47.41 mi (76.30 km) | 1,200 yd (1,100 m) | $800,000 |
| EF3 | See section on this tornado – 2 people were injured. | | | | | | | |
| EF1 | ENE of Oil Trough | Independence, Jackson | AR | 35.620°N 91.410°W | 21:13–21:20 | 5.49 mi (8.84 km) | 500 yd (460 m) | $40,000 |
| EF1 | Many trees and power poles were knocked down, and several homes sustained roof damage. | | | | | | | |
| EF1 | Southwest Greensburg | Decatur | IN | 39.3274°N 85.5213°W | 21:15–21:18 | 0.83 mi (1.34 km) | 600 yd (550 m) | $500,000 |
| EF1 | A tornado struck the southwestern portion of Greensburg, beginning at the Greensburg Municipal Airport, where hangars sustained roof and garage door damage and a small plane was thrown 50 feet (15 m). It then impacted the adjacent Greensburg Country Club, where numerous large oak trees were uprooted, one of which destroyed a picnic shelter. Thirty homes were damaged in a nearby neighborhood, some heavily; damage mainly consisted of roof, siding, gutters, and garage doors. More trees were downed, and a few outbuildings were destroyed. Other nearby homes sustained significant hail damage. | | | | | | | |
| EF1 | Northwest Greensburg | Decatur | IN | 39.3532°N 85.5090°W | 21:20–21:22 | 0.15 mi (240 m) | 400 yd (370 m) | $250,000 |
| EF1 | A second brief tornado struck the northwestern part of Greensburg in the area of Interstate 74 and U.S. Highway 421. Approximately 15 to 20 homes sustained roof and siding damage, with several garage doors buckling and blowing inwards and debris being scattered into a farm field. Plywood was found impaled into the stucco wall of a bank building. | | | | | | | |
| EF1 | SW of Fredericktown to E of Junction City | Madison | MO | 37.5386°N 90.3187°W | 21:35–21:41 | 5.49 mi (8.84 km) | 40 yd (37 m) | Unknown |
| EF1 | The tornado began just southwest of Fredericktown, with trees and tree limbs blown down. As it moved northeast, extensive tree damage occurred in the southeastern part of town, two machine sheds were severely damaged, and a two-vehicle garage was destroyed, along with a vehicle inside. A tennis court and a baseball field were damaged, a house sustained major roof damage, and a second home was damaged by falling tree limbs. Just east of town, several 300-pound (140 kg) styrofoam blocks were blown up to 80 yards (73 m) away from a distribution company. | | | | | | | |
| EF1 | Mill Spring to W of Lodi | Wayne | MO | 37.0555°N 90.7000°W | 21:37–22:04 | 17.77 mi (28.60 km) | 150 yd (140 m) | $70,000 |
| EF1 | An intermittent tornado destroyed two outbuildings and a small private covered bridge and caused minor damage to a house. Numerous trees were snapped or uprooted, and a few power poles were snapped. | | | | | | | |
| EF0 | W of Hunter | Carter | MO | 36.8846°N 90.9057°W | 21:44–21:45 | 0.49 mi (0.79 km) | 50 yd (46 m) | $2,000 |
| EF0 | A few trees and tree limbs were downed. | | | | | | | |
| EF1 | W of Burlington | Des Moines | IA | 40.7743°N 91.2255°W | 21:45–22:00 | 4.83 mi (7.77 km) | 100 yd (91 m) | $250,000 |
| EF1 | Two railroad box cars were overturned, a shed was destroyed, trees and power poles were snapped, and smaller tree limbs were broken. Much of the track was on the grounds of the Iowa Army Ammunition Plant. | | | | | | | |
| EF1 | SSW of Zion | Madison | MO | 37.3491°N 90.3785°W | 21:46–21:51 | 5.25 mi (8.45 km) | 440 yd (400 m) | $0 |
| EF1 | Numerous trees were snapped and uprooted from U.S. Highway 67 to the northeast, south of Zion. This tornado occurred simultaneously with and paralleled the path of the following tornado. | | | | | | | |
| EF1 | SSW of Zion | Madison | MO | 37.3583°N 90.3792°W | 21:47–21:51 | 4.35 mi (7.00 km) | 580 yd (530 m) | $0 |
| EF1 | Numerous trees were snapped and uprooted near U.S. Highway 67, south of Zion. This tornado occurred simultaneously with and paralleled the path of the previous tornado. | | | | | | | |
| EF0 | SW of Silver Lake | Perry | MO | 37.6376°N 90.0967°W | 21:51–21:52 | 0.3 mi (0.48 km) | 60 yd (55 m) | $3,000 |
| EF0 | Several trees and tree limbs were downed. | | | | | | | |
| EF0 | W of Torch | Ripley | MO | 36.5304°N 90.7094°W | 21:58–21:59 | 0.74 mi (1.19 km) | 50 yd (46 m) | $0 |
| EF0 | A brief tornado caused no damage. | | | | | | | |
| EF1 | S of Dodgeville to W of Sperry | Des Moines | IA | 40.9058°N 91.1814°W | 22:00–22:15 | 3.57 mi (5.75 km) | 50 yd (46 m) | $50,000 |
| EF1 | A tornado moved northward from south of Dodgeville to just north of town. A small barn and an outbuilding were destroyed, and trees were snapped. | | | | | | | |
| EF1 | Monroeville to SE of Norwalk | Huron | OH | 41.2343°N 82.6909°W | 22:00–22:15 | 7.96 mi (12.81 km) | 50 yd (46 m) | $250,000 |
| EF1 | Several homes and businesses were damaged, a few of which lost large sections of roofing, and a large barn was leveled. Dozens of trees were downed, some of which landed on structures. | | | | | | | |
| EF0 | W of Dunkirk | Hardin | OH | 40.7845°N 83.6630°W | 22:14–22:15 | 0.2 mi (320 m) | 25 yd (23 m) | $0 |
| EF0 | A brief tornado touched down in an open field, causing no damage. | | | | | | | |
| EF0 | W of Poplar Bluff | Butler | MO | 36.750°N 90.440°W | 22:14–22:15 | 0.7 mi (1.1 km) | 40 yd (37 m) | $0 |
| EF0 | A brief tornado caused no damage just west of Poplar Bluff. | | | | | | | |
| EF1 | S of Marquand to SW of Alliance | Madison, Bollinger | MO | 37.4094°N 90.1676°W | 22:26–22:33 | 13.03 mi (20.97 km) | 250 yd (230 m) | $30,000 |
| EF1 | Hundreds of trees were snapped or uprooted. | | | | | | | |
| EF0 | E of Heyworth | McLean | IL | 40.3110°N 88.8986°W | 23:06–23:07 | 0.9 mi (1.4 km) | 25 yd (23 m) | $8,000 |
| EF0 | A grain bin was damaged. | | | | | | | |
| EF1 | SE of Downs to SE of Merna | McLean | IL | 40.3601°N 88.8209°W | 23:09–23:20 | 10.3 mi (16.6 km) | 75 yd (69 m) | $10,000 |
| EF1 | A semi-truck was overturned on Interstate 74. The tornado then moved northward through open fields before dissipating. | | | | | | | |
| EF0 | Northeast Centerville | Montgomery | OH | 39.6546°N 84.1160°W | 23:10–23:11 | 0.09 mi (140 m) | 25 yd (23 m) | $5,000 |
| EF0 | A brief tornado downed a few trees on the grounds of the south campus of the Miami Valley Hospital. | | | | | | | |
| EF1 | NNW of Neely's Landing | Cape Girardeau | MO | 37.5328°N 89.5413°W | 23:18–23:22 | 2.13 mi (3.43 km) | 250 yd (230 m) | $20,000 |
| EF1 | One home sustained roof damage, a barn had tin roofing peeled back, and many trees were snapped or uprooted. | | | | | | | |
| EF0 | WNW of Greasy Corner | Saint Francis | AR | 35.0118°N 90.4947°W | 23:18–23:19 | 1.05 mi (1.69 km) | 100 yd (91 m) | $0 |
| EF0 | A weak tornado over open country caused no damage. | | | | | | | |
| EF2 | NW of Woodlawn to NE of Dix | Jefferson | IL | 38.3605°N 89.1238°W | 23:28–23:44 | 13.48 mi (21.69 km) | 250 yd (230 m) | $4,000,000 |
| EF2 | A strong tornado struck the small community of Boyd, where a church sustained roof damage and a sawmill was destroyed. Along the entire path, 101 homes were damaged, 23 of which were left uninhabitable; most sustained roof and siding loss. A popup camper and a small shed were thrown 50 to 75 feet (15 to 23 m) from where they originated, and numerous trees and power poles were snapped. | | | | | | | |
| EF0 | SE of Benton | Scott | MO | 37.080°N 89.540°W | 23:30–23:31 | 0.36 mi (580 m) | 50 yd (46 m) | $1,000 |
| EF0 | A few trees and tree limbs were downed along Interstate 55. | | | | | | | |
| EF0 | SE of Fairlawn to Cuyahoga Falls | Summit | OH | 41.1047°N 81.5525°W | 23:30–23:40 | 4.18 mi (6.73 km) | 50 yd (46 m) | $200,000 |
| EF0 | An intermittent tornado began southeast of Fairlawn in the Akron city limits and tracked into Cuyahoga Falls. A church near Fairlawn lost its roof, several buildings in downtown Cuyahoga Falls sustained roof damage, and numerous trees were snapped and uprooted along the path. | | | | | | | |
| EF1 | NNE of Anna | Union | IL | 37.4834°N 89.2430°W | 23:39–23:42 | 2 mi (3.2 km) | 125 yd (114 m) | $150,000 |
| EF1 | A couple of homes sustained minor roof damage, and numerous trees were snapped or uprooted, one of which destroyed a vehicle. | | | | | | | |
| EF1 | SW of Mound City to ENE of Mounds | Pulaski | IL | 37.0749°N 89.1764°W | 23:40–23:47 | 5.5 mi (8.9 km) | 250 yd (230 m) | $50,000 |
| EF1 | The tornado moved along the banks of the Ohio River, passing through Mound City before dissipating to the northeast. A small mobile home was thrown into a power pole, several homes sustained roof damage, and many trees were snapped or uprooted. | | | | | | | |
| EF1 | ESE of Pulaski to NW of New Grand Chain | Pulaski | IL | 37.2047°N 89.1807°W | 23:45–23:58 | 10.04 mi (16.16 km) | 120 yd (110 m) | $40,000 |
| EF1 | A small shed was damaged, several businesses near Pulaski sustained roof damage, and several trees were snapped or uprooted. | | | | | | | |
| EF1 | West Memphis | Crittenden | AR | 35.1394°N 90.1807°W | 23:48–23:51 | 2.52 mi (4.06 km) | 100 yd (91 m) | $500,000 |
| EF1 | A large storage building and a mobile home sustained major damage, while another mobile home was damaged by a falling tree. Several tree limbs and a power pole were downed as well. | | | | | | | |
| EF2 | SE of New Grand Chain to NE of Grantsburg | Pulaski, Massac, Johnson | IL | 37.220°N 88.990°W | 23:55–00:14 | 19.87 mi (31.98 km) | 325 yd (297 m) | $255,000 |
| EF2 | The tornado began along the Ohio River and moved northeast. Near New Grand Chain, trees were downed, and several recreational vehicles were damaged or overturned at a campground. In Massac County, the tornado moved north of Mermet Lake. Here, a house was damaged, with the back porch ripped off and roofing and siding removed, and a barn was destroyed, with debris scattered hundreds of yards away. In addition, an irrigation pivot was overturned, a few small outbuildings and two grain bins were destroyed (with one bin thrown 265 yards (242 m)), and four other homes were damaged by falling trees. Crossing into Johnson County near Interstate 24, the tornado destroyed a barn and then caused significant tree damage near Ganntown, where a home also sustained minor roof damage. Near Grantsburg, a pole barn was destroyed, and swirl marks were left in grass fields. Over 100 trees were downed in the Shawnee National Forest before the tornado dissipated just before reaching the Pope County line. | | | | | | | |
| EF0 | SE of Mahomet | Champaign | IL | 40.1676°N 88.3339°W | 23:58–23:59 | 0.2 mi (320 m) | 15 yd (14 m) | $5,000 |
| EF0 | A brief tornado damaged a few trees. | | | | | | | |
| EF3 | SSE of Erie to SE of Zelma | Lawrence | IN | 38.8597°N 86.3642°W | 23:58–00:11 | 6.75 mi (10.86 km) | 300 yd (270 m) | $150,000 |
| EF3 | An intense tornado caused major damage east of Bedford, where numerous homes, mobile homes, and outbuildings were either damaged or destroyed. Multiple vehicles were tossed or flipped, and many trees were snapped as well. The tornado dissipated near the Jackson County line. | | | | | | | |
| EF1 | E of Artois to SE of Chico | Glenn, Butte | CA | 39.6200°N 122.1624°W | 00:08–01:46 | 21.65 mi (34.84 km) | 120 yd (110 m) | $200,000 |
| EF1 | A slow-moving long-tracked tornado caused significant damage to two almond groves, with hundreds of almond trees uprooted and large limbs broken off others. Roofs and farm implements sustained minor damage. | | | | | | | |
| EF1 | Willows to E of Durham | Glenn, Butte | CA | 39.520°N 122.200°W | 00:12–01:32 | 26.37 mi (42.44 km) | 120 yd (110 m) | $550,000 |
| EF1 | A second slow-moving long-tracked tornado moved parallel and to the south of the previous tornado. Significant damage took place at an almond grove where thousands of trees were uprooted. In a few instances, large trees were carried 5 to 10 feet (1.5 to 3.0 m) from where they initially stood. Additionally, an outbuilding was destroyed, a barn was damaged, and two other structures sustained roof damage. | | | | | | | |
| EF1 | Clay City | Clay | IL | 38.6764°N 88.3688°W | 00:18–00:19 | 1 mi (1.6 km) | 75 yd (69 m) | $510,000 |
| EF1 | A barn and several garages were damaged, 15 homes sustained minor to moderate roof damage, a concrete block storage building collapsed, and numerous trees were downed. | | | | | | | |
| EF0 | NW of Olney | Richland | IL | 38.7447°N 88.1310°W | 00:35–00:36 | 0.2 mi (320 m) | 10 yd (9.1 m) | $0 |
| EF0 | A brief tornado in an open field caused no damage. | | | | | | | |
| EF2 | S of Robinson to W of Palestine | Crawford | IL | 38.9618°N 87.7422°W | 00:57–01:03 | 5.5 mi (8.9 km) | 200 yd (180 m) | $920,000 |
| EF2 | Fourteen houses were damaged, three of which lost most of their roofs and a fourth which was pushed off of its foundation. Outbuildings and garages were destroyed, a large camper was rolled, and numerous trees and power poles were downed as well. | | | | | | | |
| EF0 | ESE of Farmerville | Union | LA | 32.7550°N 92.3901°W | 00:58–01:10 | 5.53 mi (8.90 km) | 150 yd (140 m) | $0 |
| EF0 | This tornado began south of Farmerville over Lake D'Arbonne and moved eastward along Highway 2. Several trees were downed, and tree limbs were snapped. | | | | | | | |
| EF2 | N of St. Wendel to NE Haubstadt | Posey, Vanderburgh, Gibson | IN | 38.1387°N 87.6755°W | 01:09–01:25 | 12.17 mi (19.59 km) | 125 yd (114 m) | $240,000 |
| EF2 | Southeast of Cynthiana, trees and power lines were downed, a machine shed was damaged, and several structures were destroyed at a small airfield near Nisbet. North of Interstate 64 in Gibson County, a house was severely damaged, four barns were destroyed, and five power poles were snapped in the Haubstadt area before the tornado dissipated. | | | | | | | |
| EF0 | NW of Kirksey | Calloway | KY | 36.7287°N 88.4096°W | 01:19–01:20 | 0.27 mi (430 m) | 80 yd (73 m) | $10,000 |
| EF0 | Several dozen trees were either snapped or uprooted. | | | | | | | |
| EF1 | Marion Heights | Vigo | IN | 39.4944°N 87.4483°W | 01:20–01:21 | 0.39 mi (0.63 km) | 100 yd (91 m) | Unknown |
| EF1 | Homes sustained roof and window damage, sheds and garages were destroyed, and numerous trees were snapped and uprooted. | | | | | | | |
| EF1 | Farmerville | Union | LA | 32.782°N 92.448°W | 01:20–01:28 | 6.23 mi (10.03 km) | 400 yd (370 m) | $500,000 |
| EF1 | This tornado began west of Farmerville along Lake D'Arbonne and moved through the northern part of town. Numerous trees and several power lines were downed, with several houses damaged mostly by falling trees. Much of the town remained without electricity for over 24 hours following the tornado. | | | | | | | |
| EF2 | ESE of Oakland City | Pike | IN | 38.310°N 87.260°W | 01:35–01:37 | 1.64 mi (2.64 km) | 200 yd (180 m) | $0 |
| EF2 | Thousands of large trees were snapped or uprooted in a rural area. This tornado occurred simultaneously with the 01:36 UTC tornado in Pike County. | | | | | | | |
| EF1 | SE of Oakland City to SE of Winslow | Pike | IN | 38.3072°N 87.2500°W | 01:36–01:42 | 4.97 mi (8.00 km) | 50 yd (46 m) | $20,000 |
| EF1 | Several dozen trees were snapped or uprooted. This tornado occurred simultaneously with the 01:35 and 01:39 UTC tornadoes in Pike County. | | | | | | | |
| EF2 | NNE of Portland | Ashley | AR | 33.2662°N 91.5200°W | 01:37–01:43 | 6.25 mi (10.06 km) | 352 yd (322 m) | $100,000 |
| EF2 | Several homes sustained roof damage, a carport was destroyed, and tin roofing was torn from outbuildings. Ten power poles were snapped, multiple trees were snapped or uprooted, and several irrigation pivots were overturned. | | | | | | | |
| EF0 | Bridgeton | Parke | IN | 39.6498°N 87.1772°W | 01:38–01:39 | 0.35 mi (560 m) | 30 yd (27 m) | Unknown |
| EF0 | A brief tornado caused minor damage. | | | | | | | |
| EF1 | SSE of Winslow | Pike | IN | 38.3221°N 87.2200°W | 01:39–01:44 | 3.19 mi (5.13 km) | 60 yd (55 m) | $20,000 |
| EF1 | Several dozen trees were snapped or uprooted. This tornado occurred simultaneously with the 01:36 UTC tornado in Pike County. | | | | | | | |
| EF1 | ESE of Rockville | Parke | IN | 39.7467°N 87.1431°W | 01:40–01:43 | 0.78 mi (1.26 km) | 100 yd (91 m) | Unknown |
| EF1 | A brief tornado caused minor damage. | | | | | | | |
| EF2 | NW of Oroville | Butte | CA | 39.5980°N 121.6208°W | 01:45–01:48 | 0.21 mi (340 m) | 10 yd (9.1 m) | $120,000 |
| EF2 | This tornado caused major damage at a ranch, where a large, well-built garage was destroyed and a barn was severely damaged. | | | | | | | |
| EF2 | Huntingburg | Dubois | IN | 38.2990°N 86.9336°W | 01:50–01:52 | 1.93 mi (3.11 km) | 100 yd (91 m) | $100,000 |
| EF2 | This tornado struck the southern and eastern sides of Huntingburg. Several mobile homes were badly damaged in a mobile home park, two of which were completely destroyed. Multiple permanent homes and garages in the area sustained roof damage, along with several businesses. A few garages were destroyed, one of which was of cinder block construction, and numerous trees were snapped and uprooted along the path. | | | | | | | |
| EF1 | Haysville | Dubois | IN | 38.4824°N 86.9452°W | 01:54–01:55 | 1.87 mi (3.01 km) | 60 yd (55 m) | $30,000 |
| EF1 | A modular home lost its roof, a shed was destroyed, many trees were snapped or uprooted, and power lines were downed. | | | | | | | |
| EF1 | WSW of Bloomington | Monroe | IN | 39.1251°N 86.6112°W | 02:14–02:16 | 0.99 mi (1.59 km) | 150 yd (140 m) | $200,000 |
| EF1 | A brief tornado embedded in larger field of straight-line wind damage destroyed several mobile homes in a mobile home park. | | | | | | | |
| EF0 | ESE of Murray | Calloway | KY | 36.5903°N 88.1422°W | 02:17–02:18 | 0.39 mi (0.63 km) | 50 yd (46 m) | $50,000 |
| EF0 | Several trees and treetops were snapped, one of which crushed a car. A power line was downed, and several homes and garages sustained minor damage. | | | | | | | |
| EF2 | SSW of Orleans to SW of Leipsic | Orange | IN | 38.6328°N 86.4597°W | 02:22–02:27 | 4.3 mi (6.9 km) | 230 yd (210 m) | $150,000 |
| EF2 | A wood frame home and two brick homes sustained major damage, along with several barns and outbuildings that were either heavily damaged or destroyed. A tractor stored in one of the barns was overturned, numerous trees were snapped or uprooted, and power poles were downed. | | | | | | | |
| EF1 | NW of Saltillo | Orange, Lawrence, Washington | IN | 38.6328°N 86.4597°W | 02:28–02:31 | 3.22 mi (5.18 km) | 100 yd (91 m) | $35,000 |
| EF1 | A large barn was destroyed, a house sustained minor damage, and numerous trees were snapped or uprooted. | | | | | | | |
| EF1 | NW of Mount Carmel | Washington | IN | 38.7118°N 86.3088°W | 02:31–02:33 | 2.4 mi (3.9 km) | 130 yd (120 m) | $30,000 |
| EF1 | A metal outbuilding was heavily damaged, numerous trees were snapped or uprooted, and several power lines were downed. | | | | | | | |
| EF0 | N of Morristown | Shelby | IN | 39.6909°N 85.7041°W | 03:15–03:17 | 0.69 mi (1.11 km) | 150 yd (140 m) | $75,000 |
| EF0 | Two homes were damaged, and numerous trees were snapped or uprooted. One person was injured when a tree fell on his car. | | | | | | | |
| EF0 | NNE of Natchez | Natchitoches | LA | 31.689°N 93.032°W | 03:22–03:26 | 1.39 mi (2.24 km) | 50 yd (46 m) | $0 |
| EF0 | Several trees were downed, and tree limbs were snapped. | | | | | | | |
| EF2 | E of Littleville | Colbert, Lawrence | AL | 34.5929°N 87.5486°W | 04:17–04:21 | 2.17 mi (3.49 km) | 100 yd (91 m) | Unknown |
| EF2 | A chicken house was completely destroyed, with roofing tossed 100 yards (91 m) away. A house lost most of its roof, its adjoining carport was damaged, and a church sustained roof damage. Numerous large trees were snapped or uprooted along the path. | | | | | | | |
| EF1 | SW of Springfield | Lauderdale | AL | 34.8808°N 87.4160°W | 04:30–04:35 | 1.89 mi (3.04 km) | 100 yd (91 m) | Unknown |
| EF1 | A small barn was nearly destroyed, and several large pine trees were snapped and uprooted, one of which fell on a home, causing major damage. | | | | | | | |
| EF1 | Liberty Township | Butler | OH | 39.380°N 84.410°W | 04:30–04:33 | 2.54 mi (4.09 km) | 100 yd (91 m) | $175,000 |
| EF1 | A high-end EF1 tornado removed the roof and second story exterior walls from a house, caused significant roof damage to three homes, and caused minor roof and siding damage to several other homes. Several vehicles were damaged, including one that was flipped, and numerous trees and power poles were snapped. | | | | | | | |
| EF0 | ESE of Rogersville | Limestone | AL | 34.7803°N 87.1783°W | 04:40–04:44 | 1.27 mi (2.04 km) | 25 yd (23 m) | Unknown |
| EF0 | Several pine trees were knocked down, one of which landed on a house, and a small shed was damaged. | | | | | | | |
| EF0 | NW of Athens | Limestone | AL | 34.8454°N 87.0380°W | 04:49–04:54 | 3.84 mi (6.18 km) | 50 yd (46 m) | Unknown |
| EF0 | This tornado originated from the same circulation as the previous tornado. A large barn was severely damaged, with roof and wall removal, and many trees were downed, one of which fell into the side of a house. | | | | | | | |
| EF0 | S of Cleveland | Liberty | TX | 30.300°N 95.090°W | 04:49 | 0.5 mi (0.80 km) | 20 yd (18 m) | $0 |
| EF0 | Brief tornado over open country with no damage. | | | | | | | |
| EF0 | SSE of Athens | Limestone | AL | 34.7596°N 86.9534°W | 04:55–04:58 | 0.78 mi (1.26 km) | 50 yd (46 m) | $0 |
| EF0 | The tornado touched down on a golf course and either snapped or uprooted several trees. | | | | | | | |

=== May 26 event ===
List of confirmed tornadoes – Thursday, May 26, 2011
| EF# | Location | County / Parish | State | Start Coord. | Time (UTC) | Path length | Max width | Damage |
|---|---|---|---|---|---|---|---|---|
| EF0 | SSE of Ardmore | Limestone, Madison | AL | 34.9170°N 86.8502°W | 05:00–05:06 | 4.58 mi (7.37 km) | 50 yd (46 m) | $0 |
| EF0 | Numerous trees were downed with this tornado that originated from the same circulation as the previous tornadoes in Limestone County prior to midnight. | | | | | | | |
| EF0 | Kenefick | Liberty | TX | 30.11°N 94.85°W | 05:15 | 0.5 mi (0.80 km) | 20 yd (18 m) | $5,000 |
| EF0 | A few trees were downed, which blocked a couple roads. | | | | | | | |
| EF0 | NW of Meridianville to E of Hazel Green | Madison | AL | 34.8763°N 86.5956°W | 05:17–05:27 | 7.38 mi (11.88 km) | 50 yd (46 m) | Unknown |
| EF0 | A few homes sustained minor roof and siding damage, and numerous trees were downed. | | | | | | | |
| EF0 | W of Bloomingburg | Fayette | OH | 39.6099°N 83.4475°W | 05:25–05:26 | 0.46 mi (0.74 km) | 75 yd (69 m) | $35,000 |
| EF0 | A barn was destroyed, and two others were damaged. | | | | | | | |
| EF0 | E of Yatesville | Fayette | OH | 39.6842°N 83.4178°W | 05:26–05:27 | 0.99 mi (1.59 km) | 75 yd (69 m) | $50,000 |
| EF0 | Two barns were heavily damaged and a large tree was downed. | | | | | | | |
| EF1 | Smithville | DeKalb | TN | 35.9505°N 85.8159°W | 05:58–06:00 | 2.35 mi (3.78 km) | 50 yd (46 m) | $1,000,000 |
| EF1 | A gas station building was severely damaged, with roof removal and wall collapse, although the awning remained intact. A restaurant was damaged, and an adjacent strip mall and Smithville Elementary School sustained roof damage. A large HVAC unit was slid across the roof of the school as well. Several homes were damaged, and many trees were downed as well. This tornado was originally rated EF0 but was upgraded to high-end EF1 following a 2021 reanalysis. | | | | | | | |
| EF0 | NW of Helena | Jackson | MS | 30.5203°N 88.5481°W | 20:23–20:30 | 2.9 mi (4.7 km) | 50 yd (46 m) | $20,000 |
| EF0 | The tornado began in the Coll Town area and moved northeast. A portable office trailer was overturned, and trees and power lines were downed. | | | | | | | |
| EF0 | W of Pierpont | Ashtabula | OH | 41.7483°N 80.5964°W | 20:35–20:37 | 1.2 mi (1.9 km) | 100 yd (91 m) | $200,000 |
| EF0 | Many trees were downed and ten homes and buildings sustained roof and siding damage. | | | | | | | |
| EF1 | W of Springboro | Crawford | PA | 41.7855°N 80.5008°W | 20:40–20:51 | 6.6 mi (10.6 km) | 100 yd (91 m) | $150,000 |
| EF1 | Around ten structures sustained roof and siding damage, and numerous trees were downed along the path. | | | | | | | |
| EF3 | W of Bush | St. Tammany | LA | 30.6156°N 90.0491°W | 21:40–21:55 | 6.06 mi (9.75 km) | 150 yd (140 m) | $400,000 |
| EF3 | Two houses sustained total roof loss and exterior wall collapse, and several others sustained lesser degrees of damage. Ten to fifteen mobile homes were either damaged or destroyed as well. Many trees were downed along the path. Four people were injured. | | | | | | | |
| EF1 | New Franklin | Franklin | PA | 39.8821°N 77.6346°W | 22:10–22:11 | 0.12 mi (0.19 km) | 25 yd (23 m) | $10,000 |
| EF1 | Dozens of pine trees were snapped. | | | | | | | |
| EF1 | SW of Milan | Bradford | PA | 41.8922°N 76.5270°W | 23:00–23:32 | 0.39 mi (630 m) | 75 yd (69 m) | $20,000 |
| EF1 | Numerous trees were downed, and a trailer was damaged. | | | | | | | |
| EF1 | NE of Hogestown | Cumberland | PA | 40.2545°N 77.0360°W | 23:10–23:14 | 2.64 mi (4.25 km) | 100 yd (91 m) | $15,000 |
| EF1 | Roughly 100 trees were downed, a few homes sustained minor damage, and a small outbuilding sustained severe damage. | | | | | | | |
| EF1 | W of Marysville to E of Dauphin | Perry, Dauphin | PA | 40.3427°N 76.9519°W | 23:20–23:24 | 2.62 mi (4.22 km) | 100 yd (91 m) | $150,000 |
| EF1 | Roughly 100 trees were downed in Perry County before the tornado crossed the Susquehanna River into Dauphin County, where it caused moderate to major damage to six homes and downed about 150 more trees. | | | | | | | |
| EF1 | SW of Slate Run to Cedar Run | Lycoming | PA | 41.4523°N 77.5125°W | 23:25–23:32 | 5.57 mi (8.96 km) | 150 yd (140 m) | $8,000 |
| EF1 | About 400 trees were downed, with a few homes being damaged by fallen trees. | | | | | | | |
| EF1 | N of Cammal | Lycoming | PA | 41.4059°N 77.4655°W | 23:26–23:29 | 2 mi (3.2 km) | 100 yd (91 m) | $6,000 |
| EF1 | About 200 trees were downed and a few homes were damaged by fallen trees. | | | | | | | |
| EF0 | SE of New Weston | Mercer | OH | 40.3276°N 84.6200°W | 23:38–23:39 | 0.07 mi (110 m) | 10 yd (9.1 m) | $0 |
| EF0 | Brief tornado over open country caused no damage. | | | | | | | |
| EF0 | SSE of Gettysburg | Darke | OH | 40.1070°N 84.4930°W | 00:05–00:06 | 0.12 mi (190 m) | 10 yd (9.1 m) | $0 |
| EF0 | Brief tornado with no damage. | | | | | | | |
| EF1 | W of Schuylkill Haven to ENE of New Ringgold | Schuylkill | PA | 40.6250°N 76.2108°W | 00:20–00:45 | 17 mi (27 km) | 200 yd (180 m) | $250,000 |
| EF1 | Approximately 20 homes were damaged, four of which sustained major damage. Twelve barns and outbuildings were damaged, and roughly 1,000 trees were downed. | | | | | | | |
| EF0 | NW of Clover | York | SC | 35.1390°N 81.2760°W | 01:52–01:54 | 0.76 mi (1.22 km) | 100 yd (91 m) | Unknown |
| EF0 | A house sustained minor damage, and several trees were downed, one of which fell on a recreational vehicle. | | | | | | | |

=== May 27 event ===
List of reported tornadoes – Friday, May 27, 2011
| EF# | Location | County / Parish | State | Start Coord. | Time (UTC) | Path length | Max width |
|---|---|---|---|---|---|---|---|
| EF0 | E of Napavine | Lewis | WA | 46.58°N 122.89°W | 20:50–20:52 | 0.1 mi (160 m) | 30 yd (27 m) |
| EF0 | A brief tornado caused minor roof and siding damage to two homes and a few outbuildings and downed several trees and large tree limbs. | | | | | | |
| EF1 | NNE of Middletown | Huntingdon | PA | 40.2333°N 78.2180°W | 21:10–21:15 | 3.71 mi (5.97 km) | 300 yd (270 m) |
| EF1 | Damage was mainly to trees, with a few cabins sustaining roof and decking damage from fallen trees. | | | | | | |
| EF1 | NNE of Calvin | Huntingdon | PA | 40.3302°N 78.0291°W | 21:30–21:35 | 2.72 mi (4.38 km) | 100 yd (91 m) |
| EF1 | At least 75 trees were snapped or uprooted, a large farm shed was destroyed, a large barn had much of its tin roof peeled back, and a deck around a house sustained minor damage due to fallen trees. | | | | | | |
| EF0 | NNE of Valley City | Barnes | ND | 47.01°N 98.01°W | 21:50–22:05 | 4 mi (6.4 km) | 20 yd (18 m) |
| EF0 | Law enforcement tracked this tornado as it moved northeast on an intermittent path. | | | | | | |
| EF0 | SE of Sibley | Barnes | ND | 47.16°N 97.88°W | 22:17–22:18 | 0.5 mi (0.80 km) | 20 yd (18 m) |
| EF0 | Brief tornado with no damage. | | | | | | |

=== May 28 event ===
List of confirmed tornadoes – Saturday, May 28, 2011
| EF# | Location | County / Parish | State | Start Coord. | Time (UTC) | Path length | Max width |
|---|---|---|---|---|---|---|---|
| EF0 | W of Gaylord | Sibley | MN | 44.5500°N 94.2800°W | 19:38–19:39 | 0.1 mi (160 m) | 25 yd (23 m) |
| EF0 | A brief tornado caught on video by a storm chaser caused no damage. | | | | | | |
| EF0 | NE of Wales | Lake | MN | 47.3061°N 91.6221°W | 20:07–20:10 | 1.96 mi (3.15 km) | 350 yd (320 m) |
| EF0 | A multiple-vortex tornado in a heavily forested area produced narrow swaths of concentrated tree damage within the path of the circulation. | | | | | | |

=== May 29 event ===
List of confirmed tornadoes – Sunday, May 29, 2011
| EF# | Location | County / Parish | State | Start Coord. | Time (UTC) | Path length | Max width |
|---|---|---|---|---|---|---|---|
| EF1 | NNE of Three Rivers | St. Joseph | MI | 42.0124°N 85.6361°W | 20:10–20:12 | 2.85 mi (4.59 km) | 100 yd (91 m) |
| EF1 | A brief tornado within a large area of straight-line winds downed several trees in the Moore Park area. Hundreds of trees were felled in the larger area of wind damage, damaging homes. Minor roof damage on some homes was attributed to the tornado. | | | | | | |
| EF1 | Coldwater | Branch | MI | 41.9309°N 84.9767°W | 20:32–20:33 | 0.33 mi (0.53 km) | 50 yd (46 m) |
| EF1 | A brief tornado within a larger area of wind damage, causing major roof damage to a storage facility and a house. Another home had its garage door blown in and many trees were downed. Interstate 69 was blocked by debris as the tornado crossed over. | | | | | | |
| EF1 | SSW of Perry | Ingham, Shiawassee | MI | 42.7736°N 84.2650°W | 21:27–21:32 | 3.26 mi (5.25 km) | 100 yd (91 m) |
| EF1 | Many trees were snapped or uprooted, and a house and a barn sustained partial roof removal. | | | | | | |

=== May 30 event ===
List of confirmed tornadoes – Monday, May 30, 2011
| EF# | Location | County / Parish | State | Start Coord. | Time (UTC) | Path length | Max width |
|---|---|---|---|---|---|---|---|
| EF1 | Knoxville | Tioga | PA | 41.9590°N 77.4578°W | 05:45–05:48 | 2.54 mi (4.09 km) | 200 yd (180 m) |
| EF1 | Twenty-five homes were damaged, eight of which sustained moderate to major damage, and a community center lost its roof. About 250 trees were snapped or uprooted as well. | | | | | | |
| EF0 | NNE of Strasburg | Adams | CO | 39.93°N 104.19°W | 21:04 | 0.1 mi (160 m) | 50 yd (46 m) |
| EF0 | Brief tornado with no damage. | | | | | | |
| EF0 | SW of Rose | Rock | NE | 42.1599°N 99.5210°W | 21:20–21:21 | 0.02 mi (32 m) | 20 yd (18 m) |
| EF0 | Brief tornado in the sandhills with no damage. | | | | | | |
| EF0 | SW of Brewster | Blaine | NE | 41.8788°N 99.9388°W | 21:47–21:50 | 0.02 mi (32 m) | 50 yd (46 m) |
| EF0 | Brief tornado with no damage reported by a storm spotter. | | | | | | |
| EF0 | S of Atkinson | Holt | NE | 42.49°N 98.98°W | 22:05–22:08 | 0.01 mi (16 m) | 50 yd (46 m) |
| EF0 | Brief tornado in open fields with no damage. | | | | | | |
| EF0 | NNE of Dante | Charles Mix | SD | 43.11°N 98.15°W | 23:26–23:27 | 0.5 mi (0.80 km) | 50 yd (46 m) |
| EF0 | Brief tornado with no damage. | | | | | | |
| EF0 | ENE of O'Neill | Holt | NE | 42.4675°N 98.5984°W | 23:52–23:53 | 0.01 mi (16 m) | 20 yd (18 m) |
| EF0 | Law enforcement witnessed a brief tornado pick up dust, but no damage was observed. | | | | | | |
| EF0 | NW of Cozad | Dawson | NE | 40.8897°N 100.0312°W | 00:34–00:36 | 0.36 mi (580 m) | 25 yd (23 m) |
| EF0 | Brief tornado with no damage. | | | | | | |
| EF0 | NNW of Junius | Lake | SD | 44.05°N 97.29°W | 01:12–01:14 | 0.74 mi (1.19 km) | 50 yd (46 m) |
| EF0 | Several trees were downed. | | | | | | |
| EF0 | S of Ramona | Lake | SD | 44.11°N 97.21°W | 01:22–01:23 | 0.5 mi (0.80 km) | 50 yd (46 m) |
| EF0 | Brief tornado with no damage. | | | | | | |
| EF2 | N of Walcott | Richland, Cass | ND | 46.6007°N 96.9400°W | 01:46–01:50 | 4.27 mi (6.87 km) | 600 yd (550 m) |
| EF2 | Several wooden power poles and four steel high-voltage towers were downed east of Kindred. | | | | | | |
| EF1 | SE of Horace | Cass | ND | 46.71°N 96.87°W | 01:52–01:54 | 2.23 mi (3.59 km) | 150 yd (140 m) |
| EF1 | A parked semi trailer was flipped, two large steel grain bins were tossed, and several trees were downed, some landing on rooftops in the St. Benedict area near Interstate 29. | | | | | | |
| EF2 | NNE of Horace to Southwest Fargo | Cass | ND | 46.77°N 96.87°W | 01:55–01:59 | 4 mi (6.4 km) | 400 yd (370 m) |
| EF2 | A high-end EF2 tornado removed sections of roofing from two apartment buildings, caused roof damage to several houses, and damaged vehicles. Several trees and wooden power poles were downed, along with two metal truss power poles. | | | | | | |
| EF1 | Southeast Moorhead to N of Dilworth | Clay | MN | 46.85°N 96.74°W | 02:01–02:05 | 4.51 mi (7.26 km) | 200 yd (180 m) |
| EF1 | Several power poles were snapped, and numerous trees were downed. | | | | | | |
| EF2 | West Fargo to E of Harwood | Cass | ND | 46.8749°N 96.8725°W | 02:03–02:13 | 7.44 mi (11.97 km) | 600 yd (550 m) |
| EF2 | A high-end EF2 tornado collapsed two radio towers and tore steel wall and roofing panels from industrial buildings. Several trailers were flipped and thrown, and numerous trees and power poles were snapped. | | | | | | |
| EF1 | SW of Crookston to E of Fisher | Polk | MN | 47.66°N 96.81°W | 02:26–02:39 | 9 mi (14 km) | 100 yd (91 m) |
| EF1 | A 30-by-40-foot (9.1 m × 12.2 m) building was lifted from its foundation and destroyed, and many trees were snapped. | | | | | | |
| EF1 | Park Rapids | Hubbard | MN | 46.91°N 95.10°W | 03:35–03:44 | 6 mi (9.7 km) | 300 yd (270 m) |
| EF1 | An EF1 tornado moved through Park Rapids, embedded within a larger microburst area. Several sections of center pivot irrigation systems were overturned, the roof of a local grandstand was lifted off, and a few other buildings sustained minor damage. Numerous large trees were snapped or uprooted as well. | | | | | | |

=== May 31 event ===
List of confirmed tornadoes – Tuesday, May 31, 2011
| EF# | Location | County / Parish | State | Start Coord. | Time (UTC) | Path length | Max width |
|---|---|---|---|---|---|---|---|
| EF1 | N of Willard to Linwood | Bay | MI | 43.7086°N 84.1100°W | 23:26–23:37 | 8.38 mi (13.49 km) | 200 yd (180 m) |
| EF1 | The tornado began near Beaver, where a barn was destroyed and homes were damaged, mostly garages and roofs. Numerous trees were uprooted with large limbs snapped along the path. The tornado moved over Saginaw Bay at Linwood, becoming a waterspout. | | | | | | |

== See also ==
- Tornadoes of 2011
- List of United States tornadoes in April 2011
- List of United States tornadoes in June 2011
