= Pioneer Bridge Co. =

Pioneer Bridge Co. was an American bridge company located in Mitchell, South Dakota.

The company was founded by Arthur Bjodstrup in 1912. His father, Fred Bjodstrup, had previously built a number of bridges in South Dakota.

A number of its works are listed on the U.S. National Register of Historic Places. One bridge over Twelve Mile Creek near Mitchell was still standing as of 1993.

Works include:

- Dell Rapids Bridge, local road over the Big Sioux River, Dell Rapids, South Dakota (Pioneer Bridge Company), NRHP-listed
- South Dakota Dept. of Transportation Bridge No. 18-040-137, local road over Enemy Creek, Mitchell, South Dakota (Pioneer Bridge Company), NRHP-listed
- South Dakota Dept. of Transportation Bridge No. 18-060-202, local road over Twelve Mile Creek, Mitchell, South Dakota (Pioneer Bridge Company), NRHP-listed
- South Dakota Dept. of Transportation Bridge No. 18-100-052, local road over Firesteel Creek, Loomis, South Dakota (Pioneer Bridge Company), NRHP-listed
