= Twelve Mile Creek =

Twelve Mile Creek or Twelvemile Creek may refer to:

- Twelvemile Creek (Missouri), a stream in Missouri
- Twelve Mile Creek (Ontario), a waterway located in the Niagara Peninsula of Ontario, Canada with headwaters in Pelham, Ontario
- Twelvemile Creek (Pennsylvania), a tributary of Lake Erie located in Erie County, Pennsylvania, USA
- Twelvemile Creek (South Dakota), a stream in South Dakota
- Bronte Creek, also known as Twelve Mile Creek, a waterway in Hamilton, and Halton regions, Ontario, Canada
