= Saco, Missouri =

Unincorporated community in Missouri, U.S.

Coordinates: 37°21′56″N 90°26′21″W

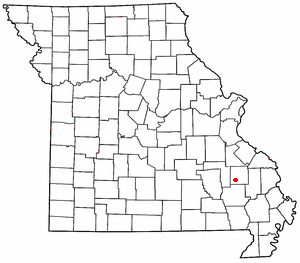

Saco is an unincorporated community in southern Madison County, Missouri, United States. The community is situated on Twelvemile Creek and is located sixteen miles southwest of Fredericktown on Missouri Route C.

Photo of the Saco area

A post office called Saco was established in 1892, and remained in operation until 1979. It is unclear why the name Saco was applied to this community.
