= Twelvemile, Missouri =

Unincorporated community in Missouri, U.S.

Coordinates: 37°21′58″N 90°21′47″W

Twelvemile is an unincorporated community in Madison County, in the U.S. state of Missouri.

== History ==
A post office called Twelve Mile was established in 1876, and remained in operation until 1910. The community took its name from being 12 miles from Fredericktown, Missouri, and gave its name to the creek that runs by it, Twelvemile Creek.
