= Twelvemile Creek (Missouri) =

Stream in the American state of Missouri

Twelvemile Creek is a stream in Madison County in the U.S. state of Missouri. It is a tributary of St. Francis River.

The stream headwaters arise on the east flank of Matthews Mountain at 37°29′23″N 90°20′07″W and it flows southeast and then south to parallel US Route 67 past the communities of Zion and Twelvemile. Just south of that community the stream turns to the west and flows past the community of Saco to its confluence with the St. Francis at 37°22′20″N 90°27′23″W.

Part of the course of Twelvemile Creek adjacent to the community of Twelvemile lies 12 miles (19 km) south of Fredericktown, hence the name.

== See also ==
- List of rivers of Missouri
