= Zion, Missouri =

Unincorporated community in Missouri, U.S.

Coordinates: 37°25′18″N 90°18′36″W

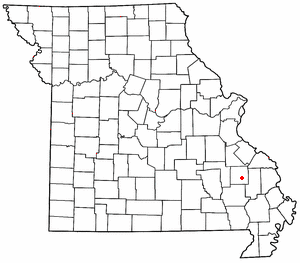

Zion is an unincorporated community in Central Township in southern Madison County, Missouri, United States. It is located on U.S. Route 67, approximately ten miles south of Fredericktown. The community is situated on the banks of Twelve Mile Creek.

A post office called Zion was in operation from 1880 until 1964. The community took its name from a nearby church of the same name, which in turn was named after Mount Zion in West Asia.
