= Twelvemile Creek (South Dakota) =

Stream in South Dakota, U.S.

Coordinates: 43°25′41″N 97°48′02″W

Twelvemile Creek is a stream in the U.S. state of South Dakota.

Twelvemile Creek was named for its distance, 12 miles (19 km) from Macy (an extinct town).

== See also ==
- List of rivers of South Dakota
